= Wrathful deities =

Ferocious deities or manifestations in Dharmic religions

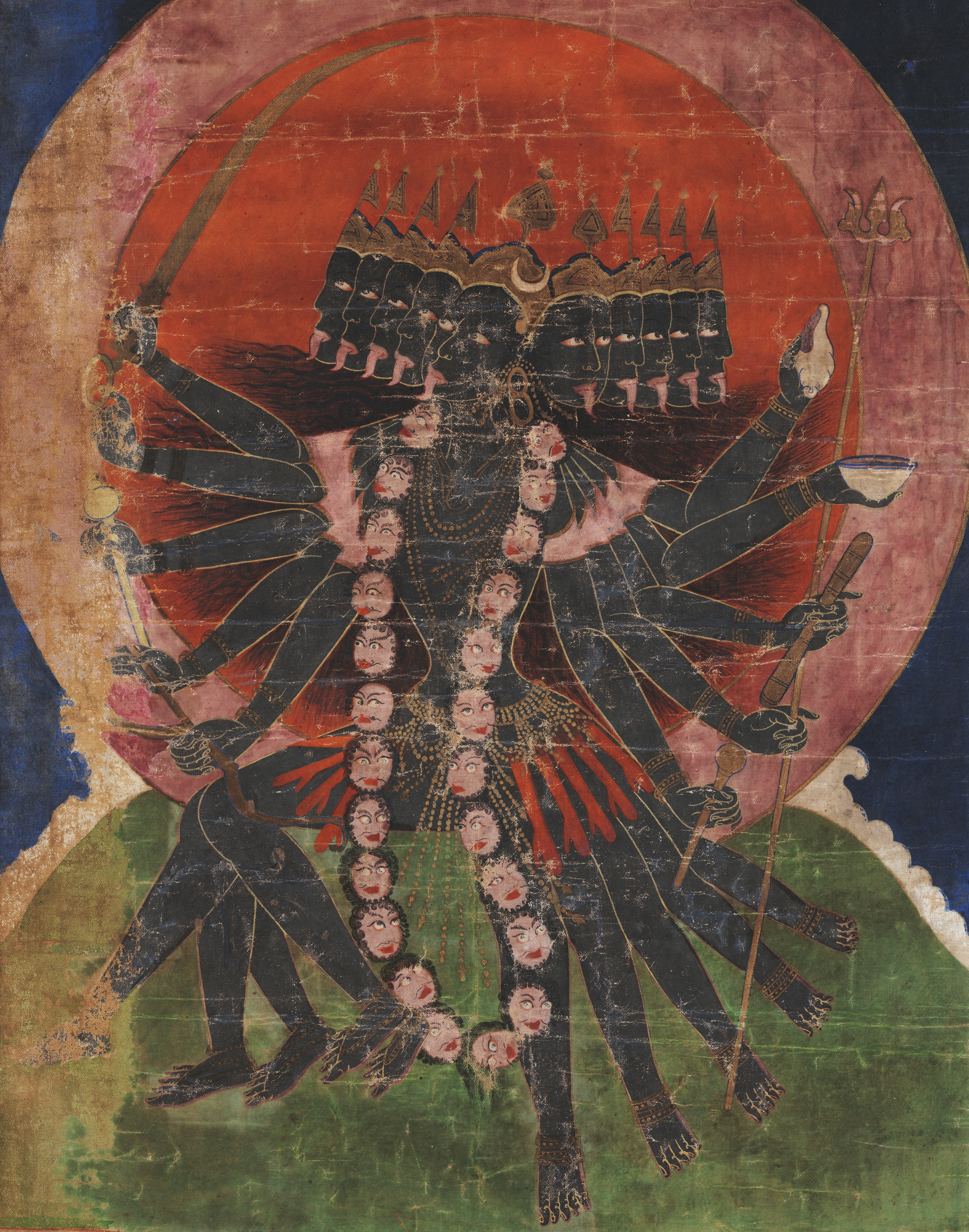
The goddess Mahakali is generally considered to be the fearsome manifestation of Mahadevi or Parvati, especially in Hindu Shaktism.

In Dharmic religions like Hinduism and Buddhism, wrathful or fierce deities are distinctively fearsome, wrathful, or forceful (Sanskrit: krodha, Tibetan: trowo, etc) beings, who may be alternative forms ("avatars," "aspects," "manifestations") of other deities.

In Buddhism, wrathful deities are manifestations of enlightened Buddhas, Bodhisattvas or Devas (divine beings); normally the same figure has other, peaceful, aspects as well. Because of their power to destroy the obstacles to enlightenment, they are also termed krodha-vighnantaka, "Wrathful onlookers on destroying obstacles". Wrathful deities are a notable feature of the iconography of Mahayana and Vajrayana Buddhism, especially in Tibetan art. These types of deities first appeared in India during the late 6th century, with its main source being the Yaksha imagery, and became a central feature of Indian Tantric Buddhism by the late 10th or early 11th century.

== Overview ==
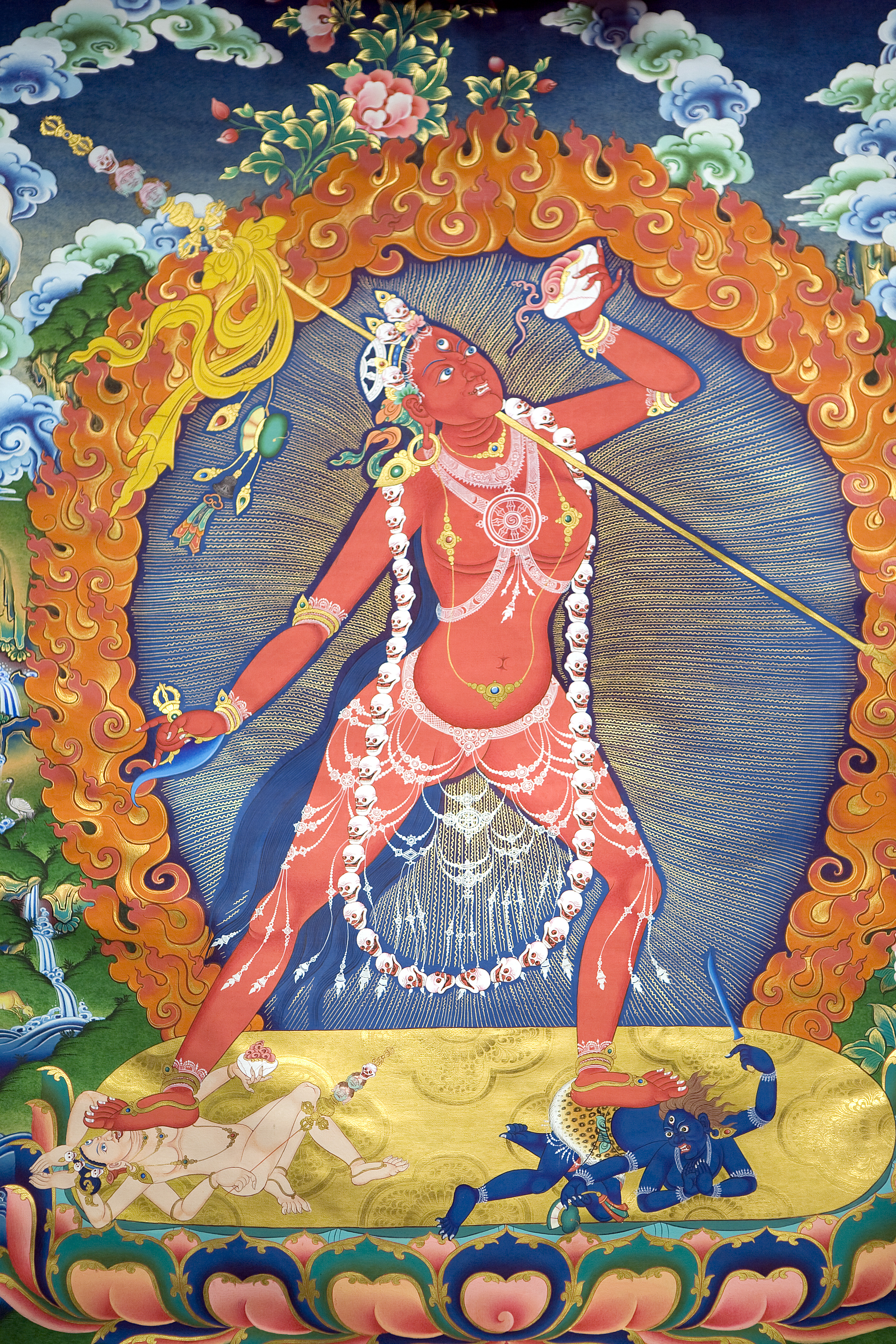
Vajrayogini, a semi-wrathful dakini who is also known as sarvabuddhaḍākiṇī, the all-buddha Dakini.

In non-Tantric traditions of Mahayana Buddhism, these beings are protector deities who destroy obstacles to the Buddhas and the Dharma, act as guardians against demons and gather together sentient beings to listen to the teachings of the Buddhas. In Tantric Buddhism, they are considered to be fierce and terrifying forms of Buddhas and Bodhisattvas themselves. Enlightened beings may take on these forms in order to protect and aid confused sentient beings. They also represent the energy and power that is needed in order to transform negative mental factors into wisdom and compassion. They represent the power and compassion of enlightened activity which uses multiple skillful means (upaya) to guide sentient beings as well as the transformative element of tantra which uses negative emotions as part of the path. According to Chögyam Trungpa, "wrathful yidams work more directly and forcefully with passion, aggression, and delusion — conquering and trampling them on the spot."

In Tantric Buddhist art, fierce deities are presented as terrifying, demonic-looking beings adorned with bone ornaments (Sanskrit: aṣṭhimudrā) such as human skulls and other ornaments associated with the charnel ground, as well as being often depicted with sexually suggestive attributes. According to Rob Linrothe, the sensual and fierce imagery represents "poison as its own antidote, harnessed obstacles as the liberating force" and notes that they are "metaphors for the internal yogic processes to gain enlightenment".

They often carry ritual implements, or some of the ashtamangala, or "Eight Auspicious Symbols", and are depicted trampling on (much smaller) bodies personifying the "obstacles" that the deity defeats.

== Tantric deities ==
=== Yidams ===
In Indo-Tibetan Vajrayana, Yidams are divine forms of Buddhas and Bodhisattvas. The tantric practitioner is initiated into the mandala of a particular meditational deity (Sanskrit: Iṣṭa-devatā) and practices complex sadhanas (meditations) on the deity for the purpose of personal transformation. This Deity Yoga practice is central to tantric forms of Buddhism such as Tibetan Buddhism and the Generation stage of the practice is dependent on visualisation based on the vivid iconography associated with their yidam. Yidams can be peaceful, fierce and "semi-fierce" (having both fierce and peaceful aspects), with each category having its own particular set of associated imagery. Fierce deities can be divided into male and female categories.

The Herukas (Tb. khrag 'thung, lit. "blood drinker") are enlightened masculine beings who adopt fierce forms to express their detachment from the world of ignorance, such as Yamantaka, Cakrasamvara, Mahākāla, Hayagriva, or Vajrakilaya.

Dakinis (Tb. khandroma, "sky-goer") are their feminine counterparts, sometimes depicted with a heruka and sometimes as independent deities. The most prevalent wrathful dakinis are Vajrayogini and Vajravārāhī. A common form of imagery is the yab-yum of a Buddha and consort in sexual union.

==== Gallery ====
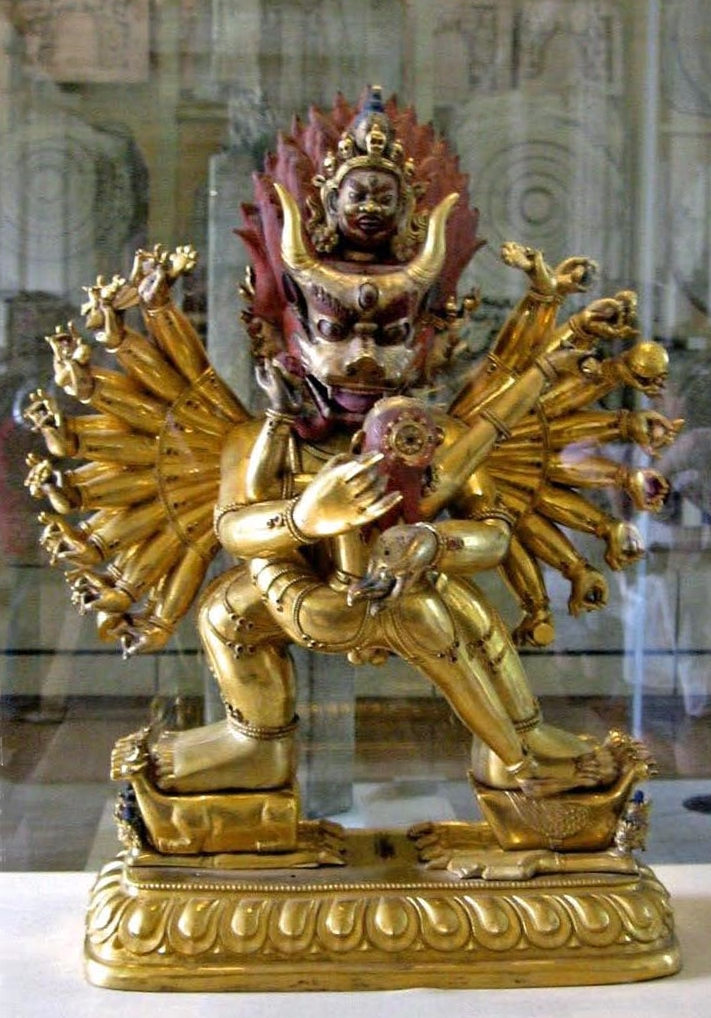
Yamantaka, also known as Vajrabhairava.

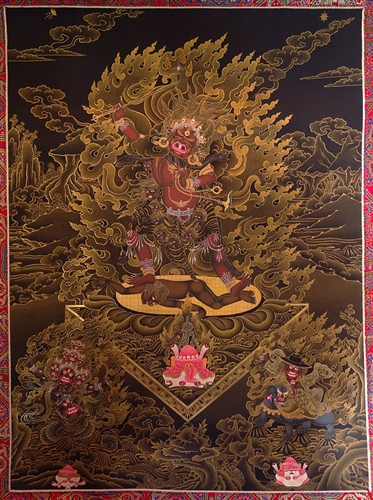
Ekajati, also known as Blue Tara or Ugra Tara.

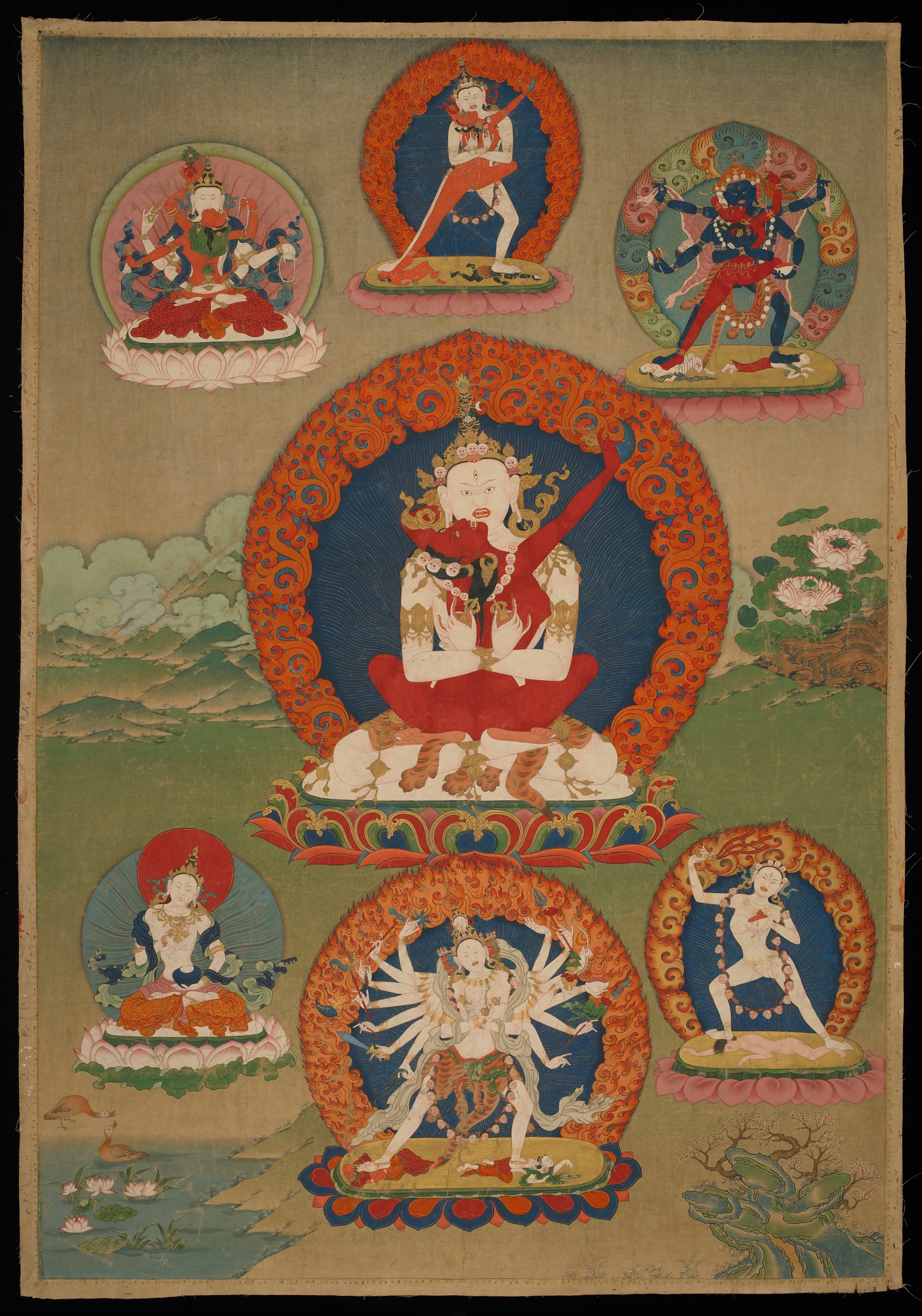
Chakrasamvara, a semi-wrathful deity, depicted in yab-yum with consort

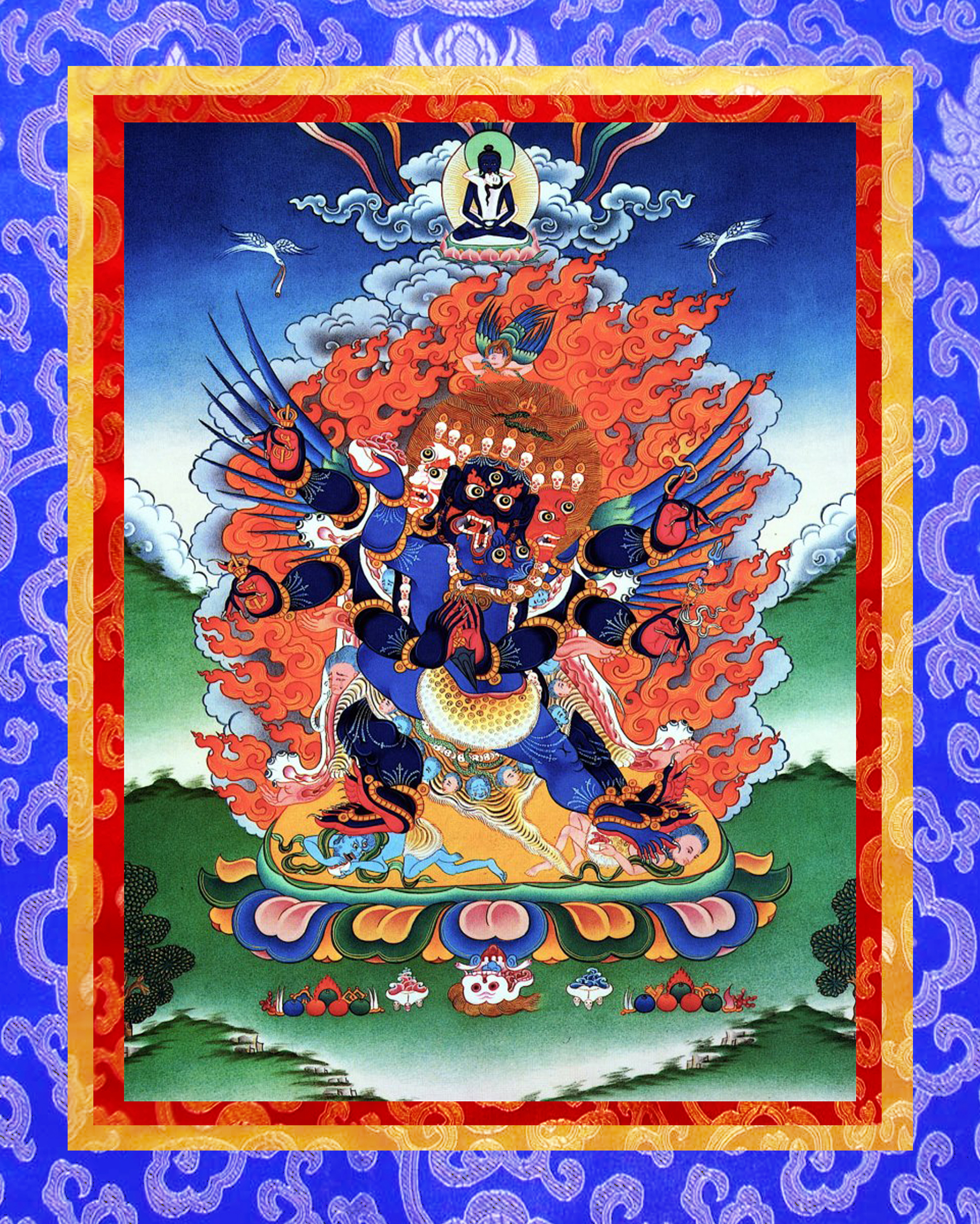
Vajrakilaya

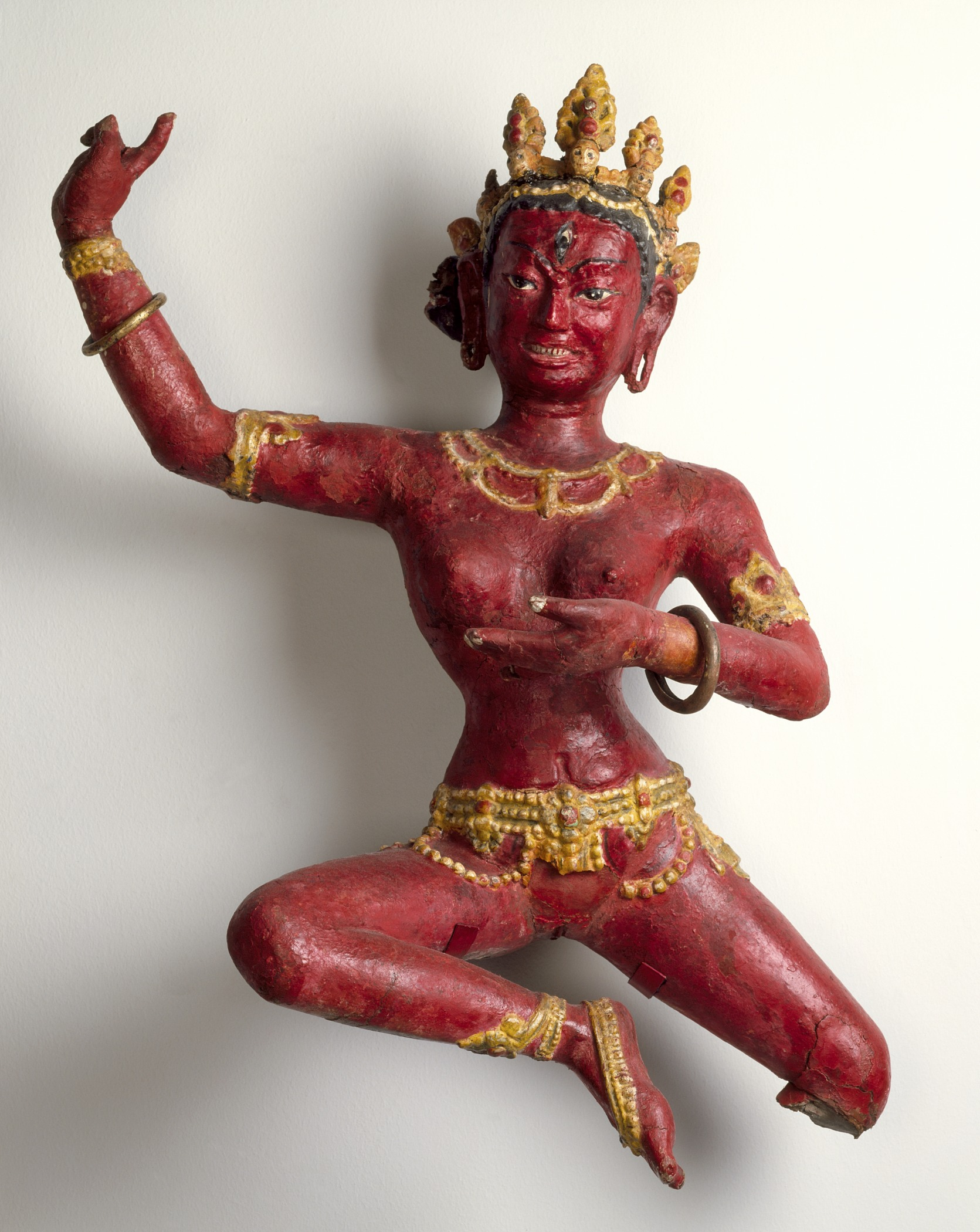
Dancing Vajravarahi (Dorje Pagmo)

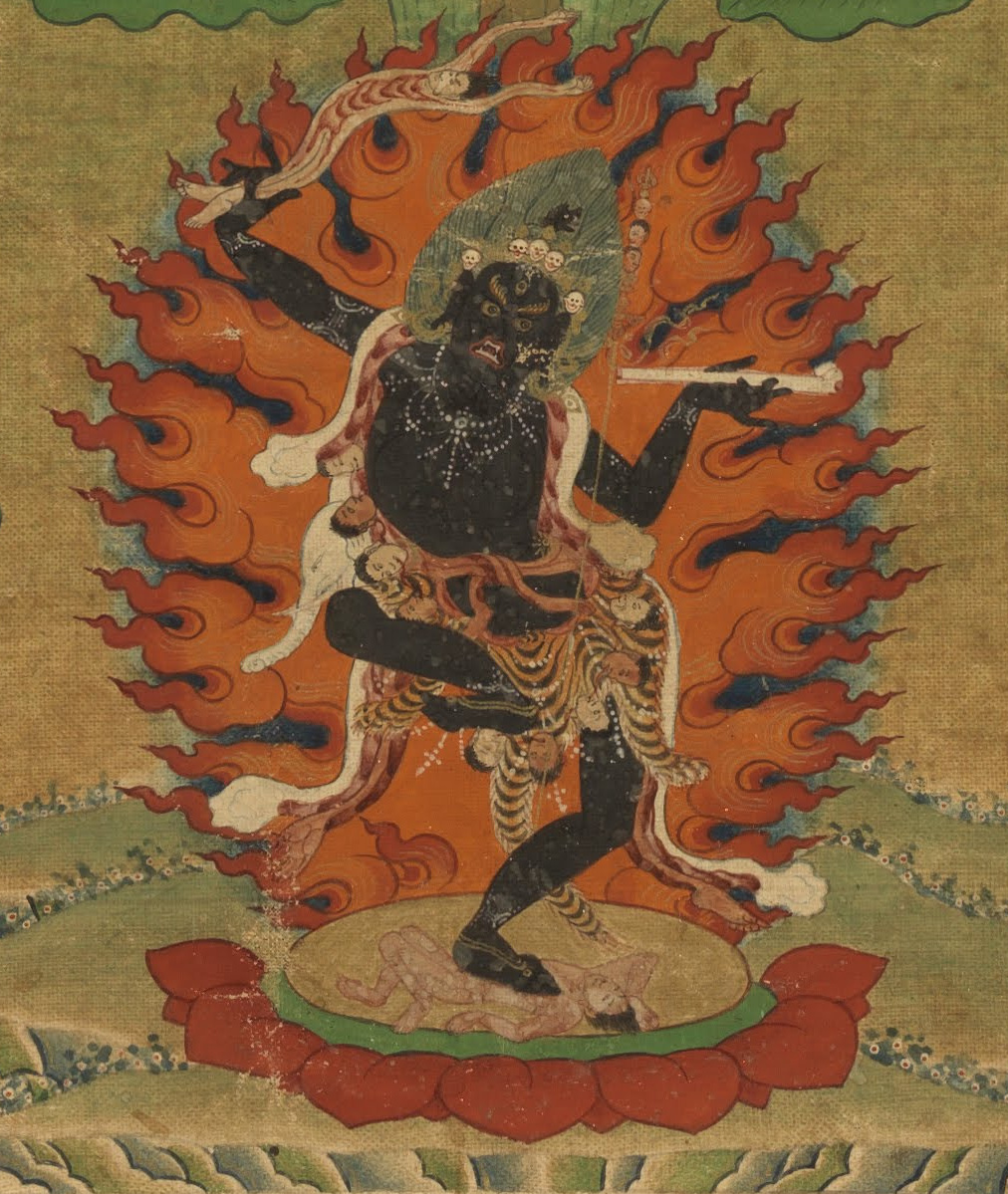
Troma Nagmo

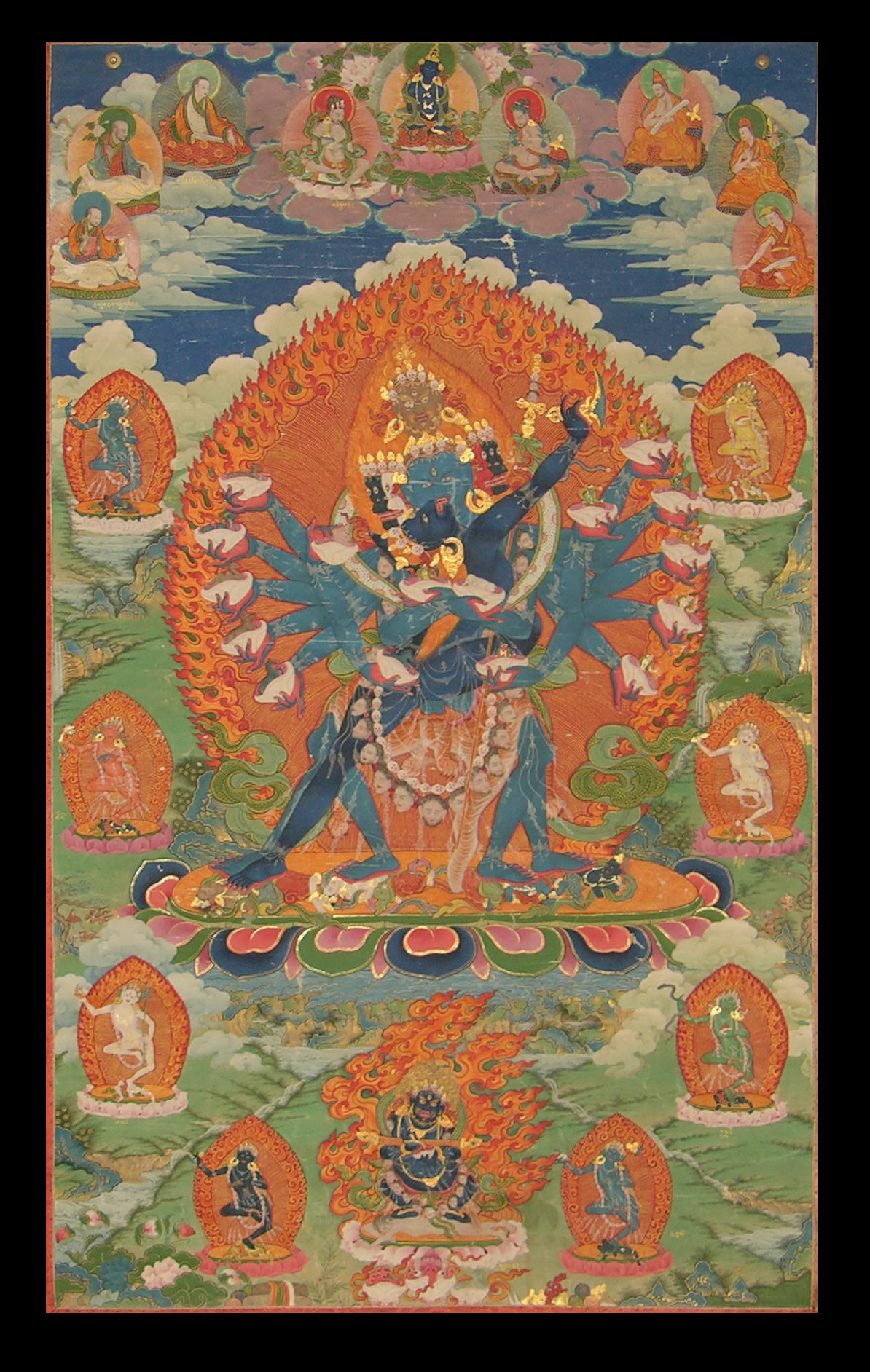
Hevajra

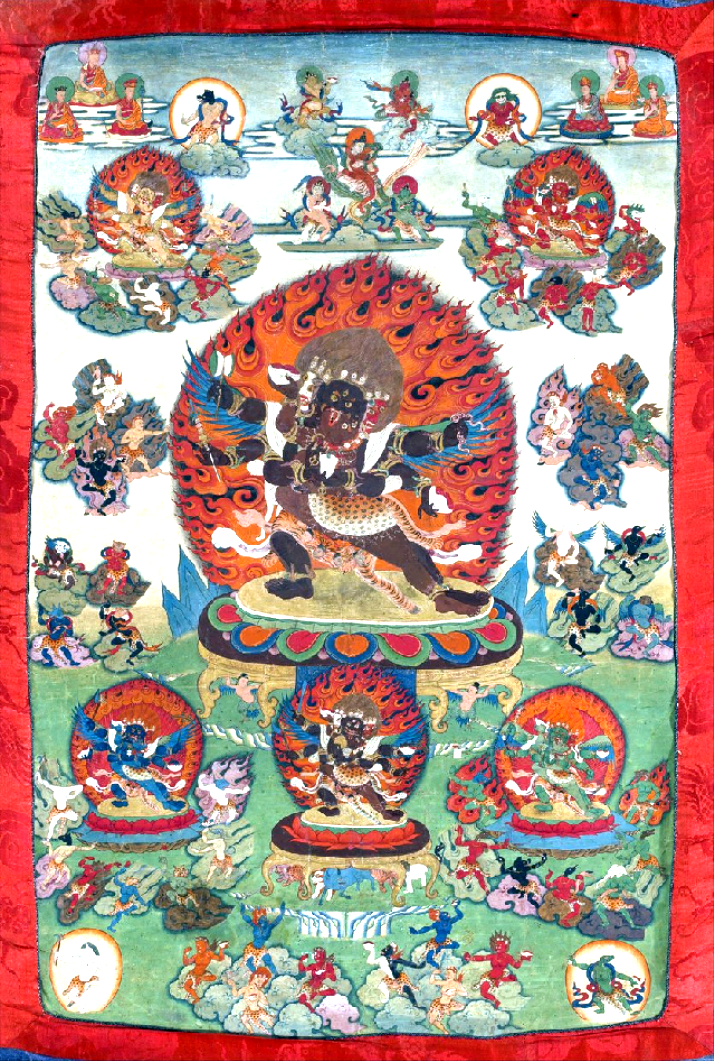
The Herukas of the Guhyagarbha Tantra

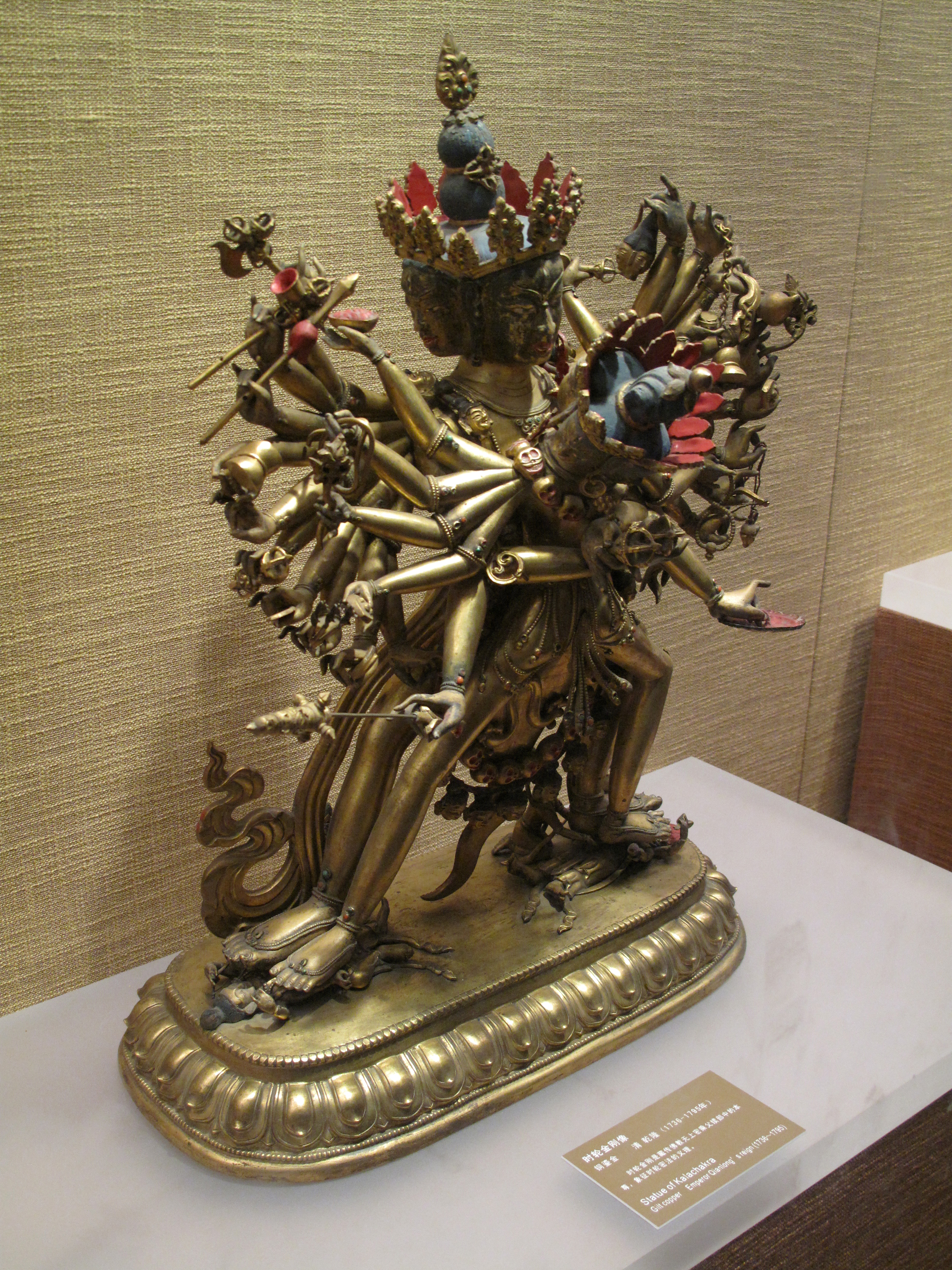
Kalachakra statue

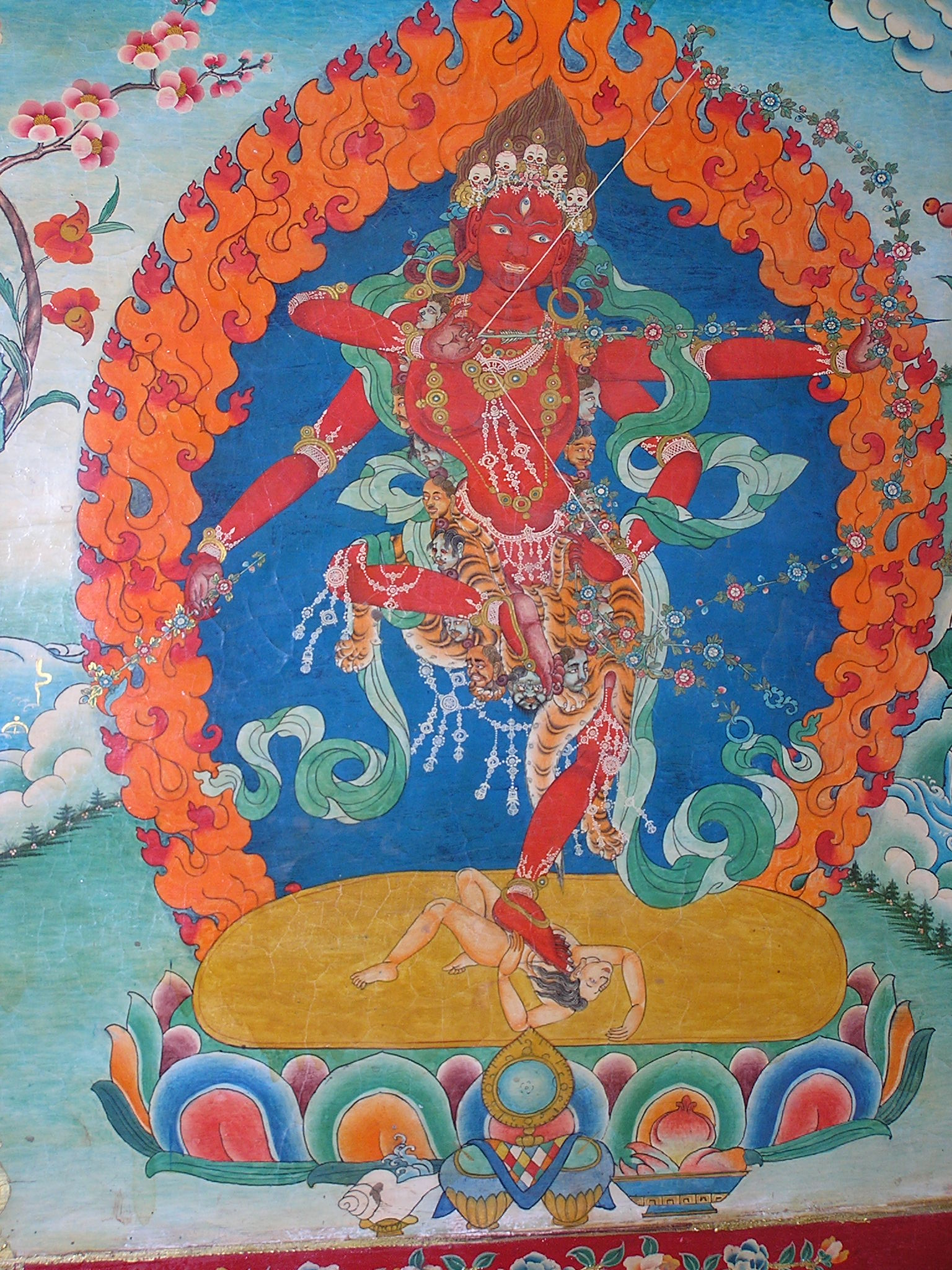
Kurukullā

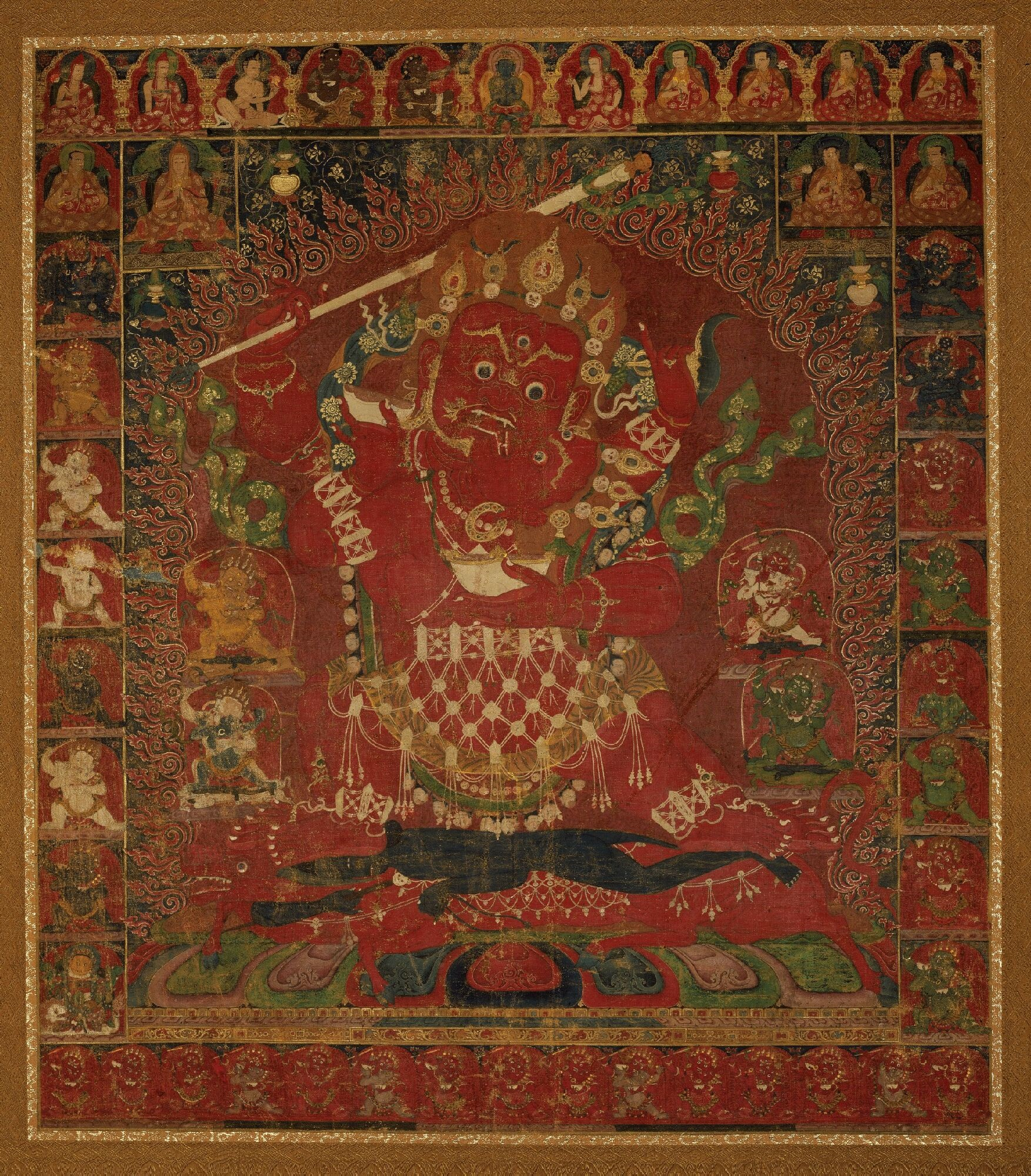
Rakta Yamari

=== Wisdom Kings ===
In East Asian Buddhism, Wisdom Kings (Sanskrit vidyarāja), are seen as divine manifestations of the Buddhas, who act as protectors, messengers, and defenders of the Buddhist Dharma. In East Asian Vajrayana and Chinese Esoteric Buddhism the Five Wisdom Kings are regarded as manifestations of the Five Tathagatas. In Chinese Buddhism, the Eight Wisdom Kings and Ten Wisdom Kings are regarded as manifestations of different bodhisattvas and buddhas.

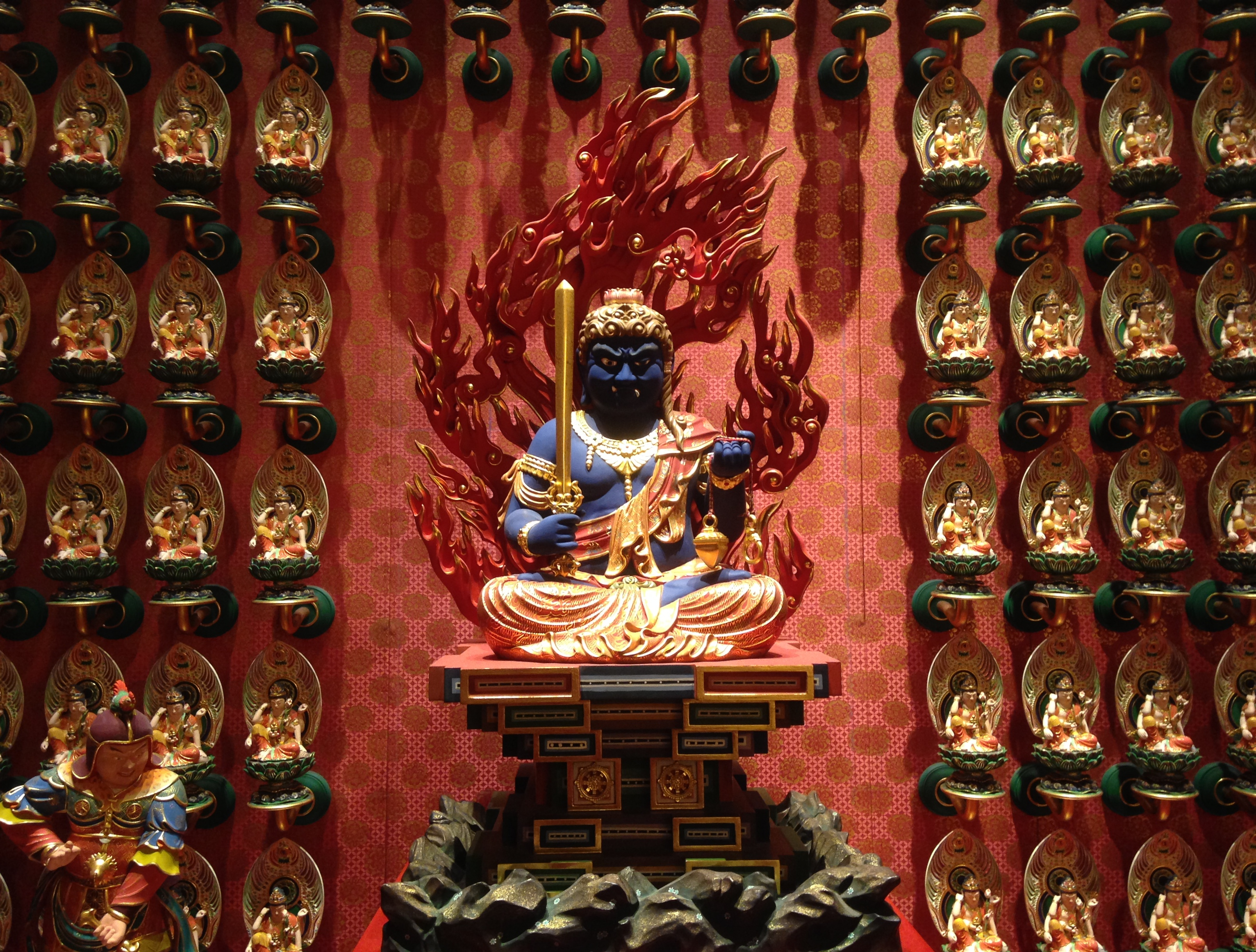
Acala, "The Immovable One"—manifestation of Buddha Mahavairocana

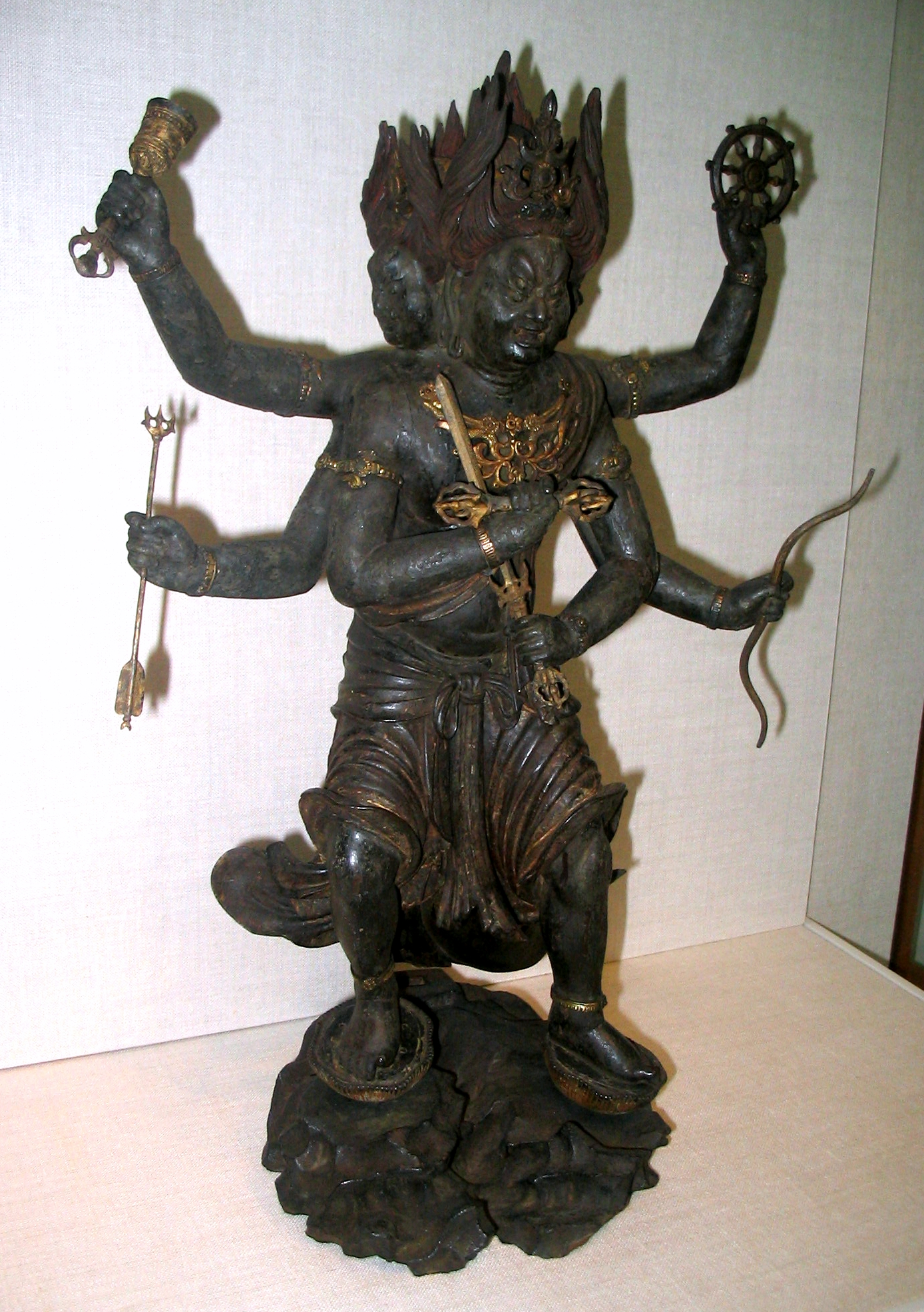
Vajrayaksa, "The Devourer of Demons"—manifestation of Buddha Amoghasiddhi

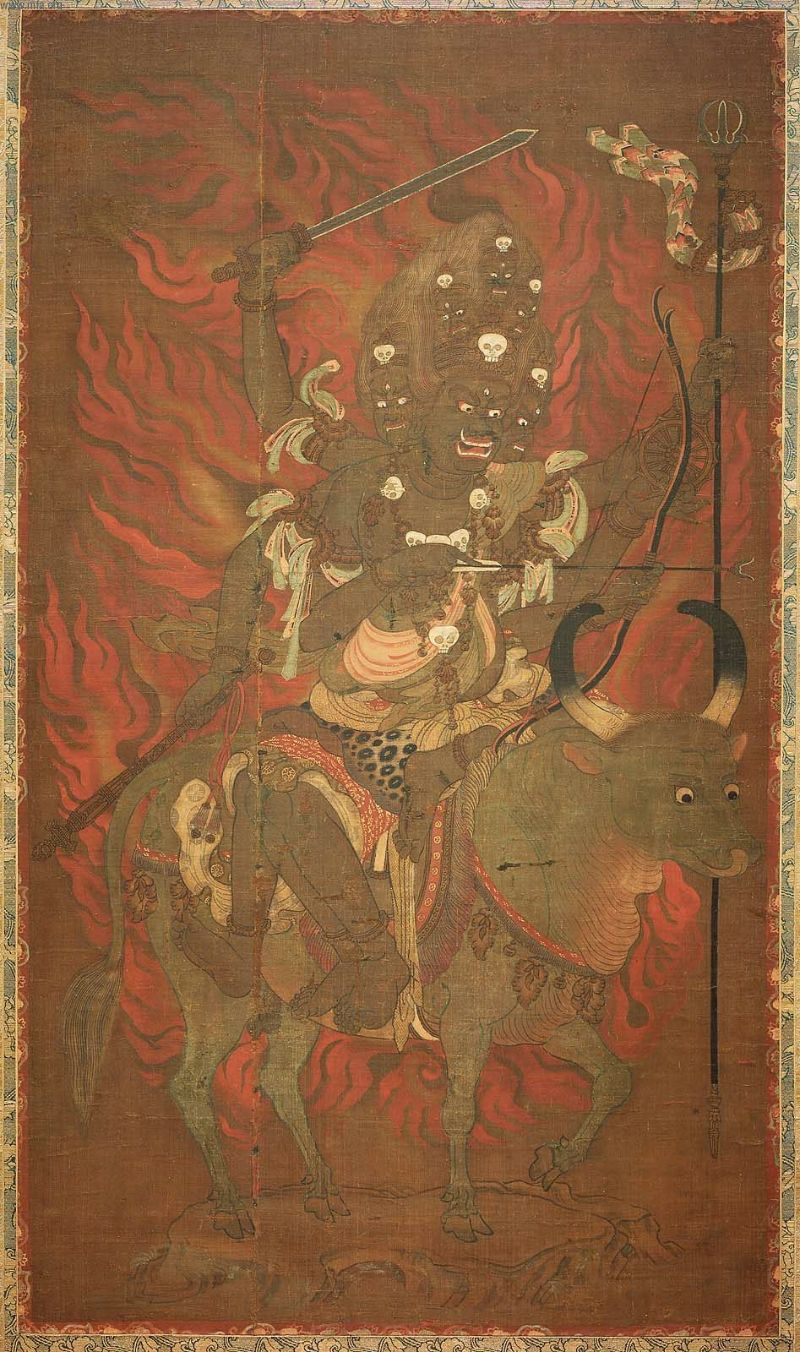
Vajrabhairava, "The Defeater of Death"—manifestation of Buddha Amitābha

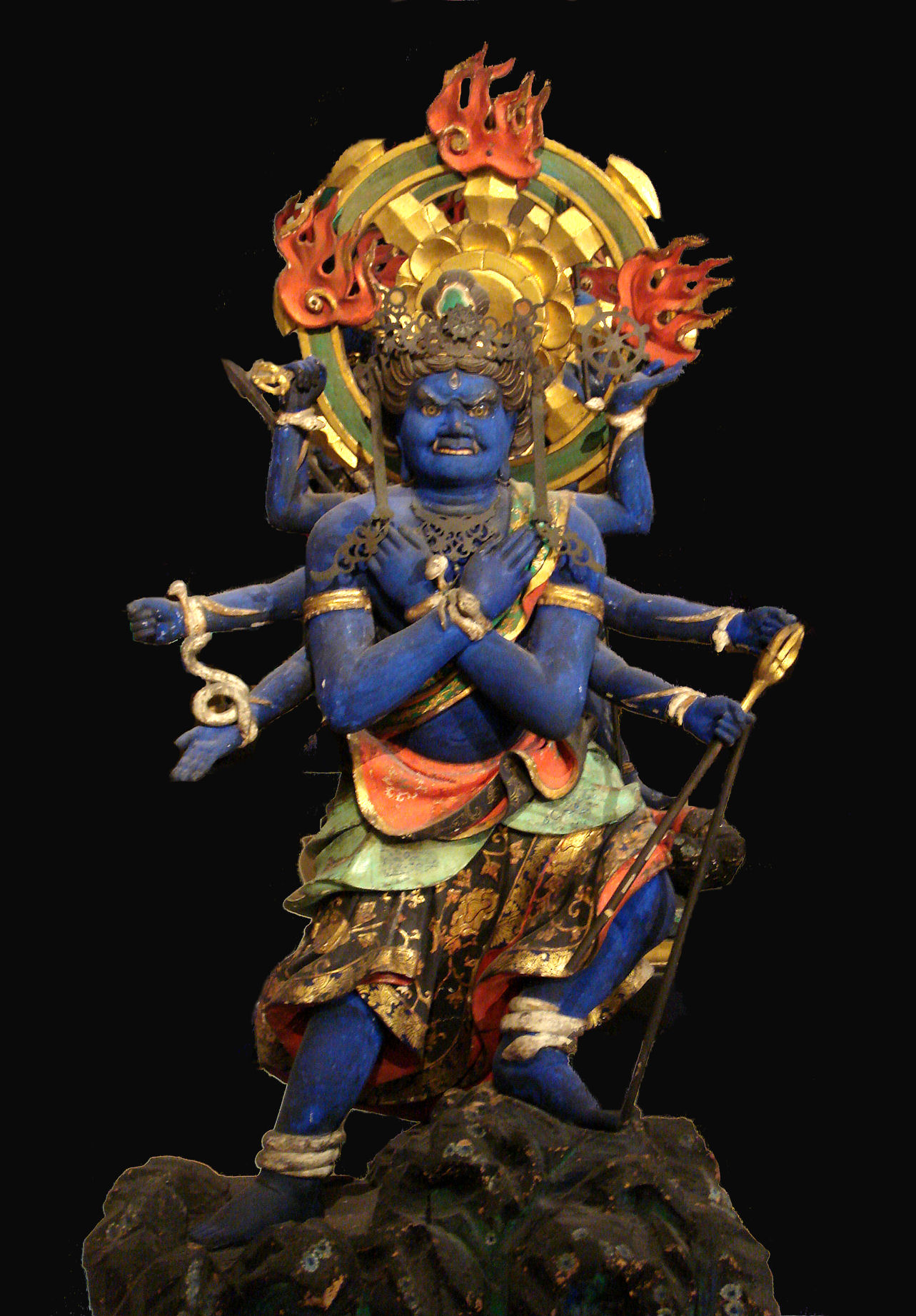
The Wisdom king Kundali, "The Dispenser of Heavenly Nectar"—manifestation of Buddha Ratnasambhava

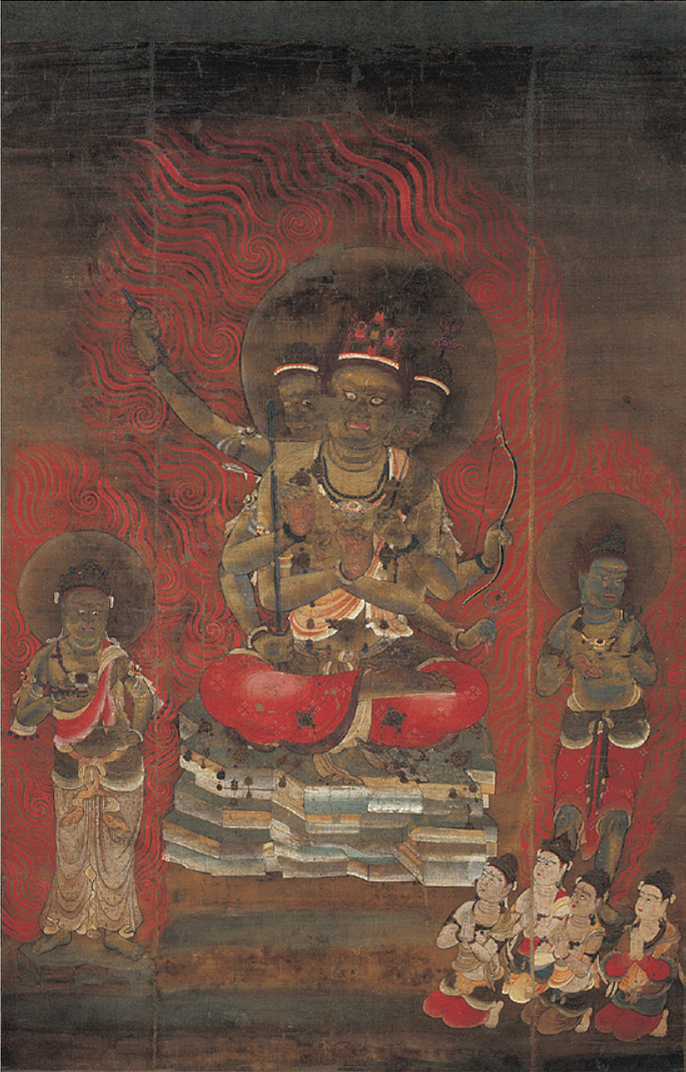
Trailokyavijaya, "The Conqueror of The Three Planes"—manifestation of Buddha Akshobhya

== Protectors ==
The Protectors (Sanskrit pāla) or Dharmapāla (Dharma protectors), are powerful beings, often Devas or Bodhisattvas who protect the Buddhist religion and community from inner and outer threats and obstacles to their practice. A Dharmapala can also be a Garuda, Nāga, Yaksha, Gandharva, or Asura. Other categories of Protectors include the Lokapālas or "Four Heavenly Kings" and Kṣetrapālas or "Protectors of the Region".

=== Eight Dharmapalas ===
A common Tibetan grouping of Dharmapāla is 'The Eight Dharmapalas' (Tibetan: དྲག་གཤེད, Wylie: drag gshed), who are understood to be the defenders of Buddhism. They are supernatural beings with the rank of bodhisattva who "are supposed to wage war without any mercy against the demons and enemies of Buddhism". The Eight Dharmapala are:

- Yama, the god of death
- Mahakala, the Great Black One
- Yamantaka, the conqueror of death
- Vaiśravaṇa or Kubera, the god of wealth
- Hayagriva, the Horse-necked one
- Palden Lhamo, female protectress of Tibet
- White Brahma or Tshangs pa
- Begtse, a war god from Mongolia.

=== Gallery ===
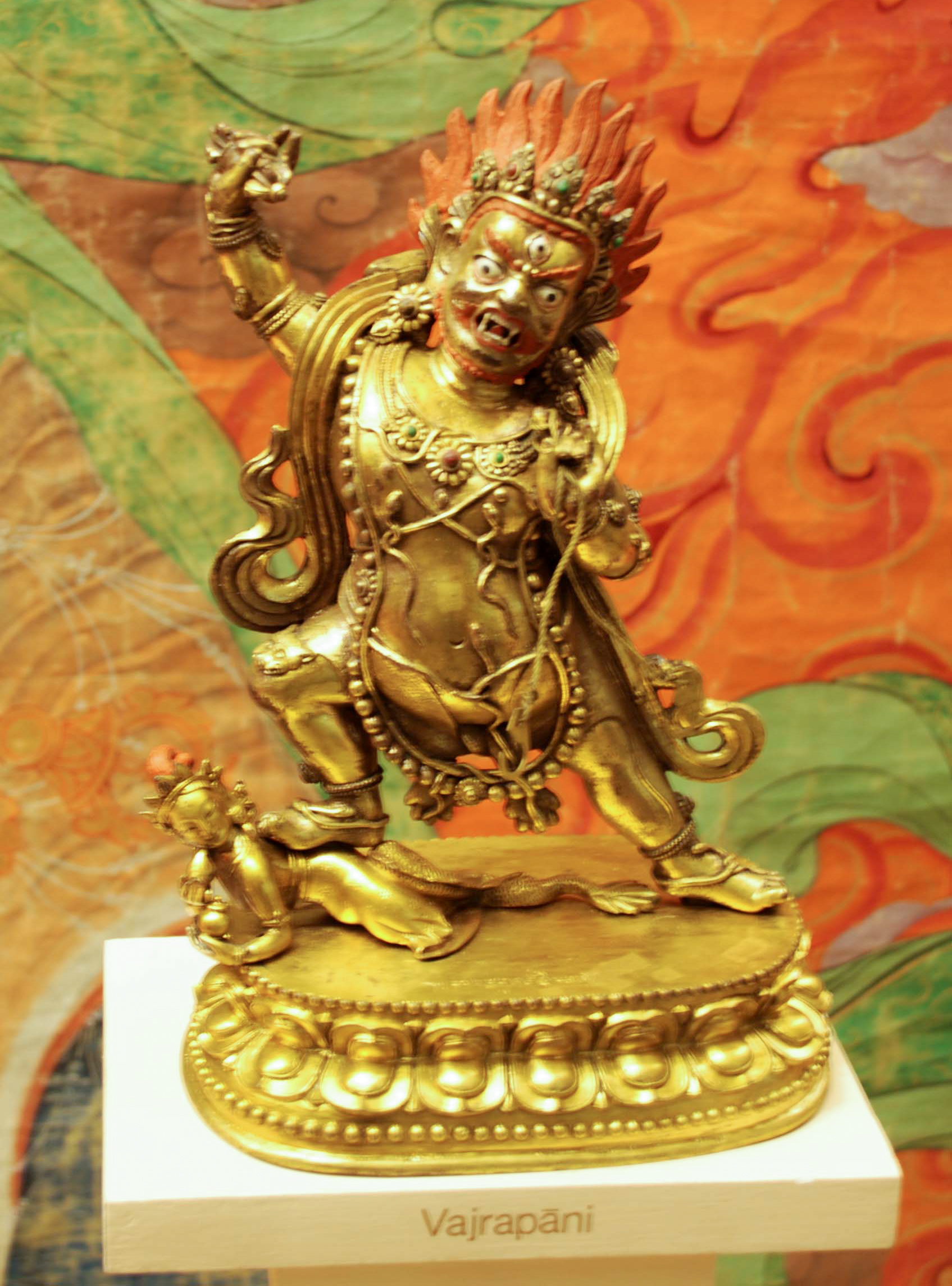
Vajrapani

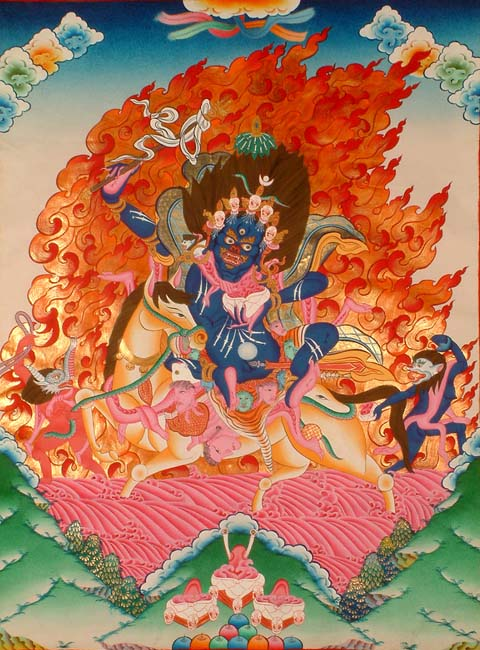
Palden Lhamo

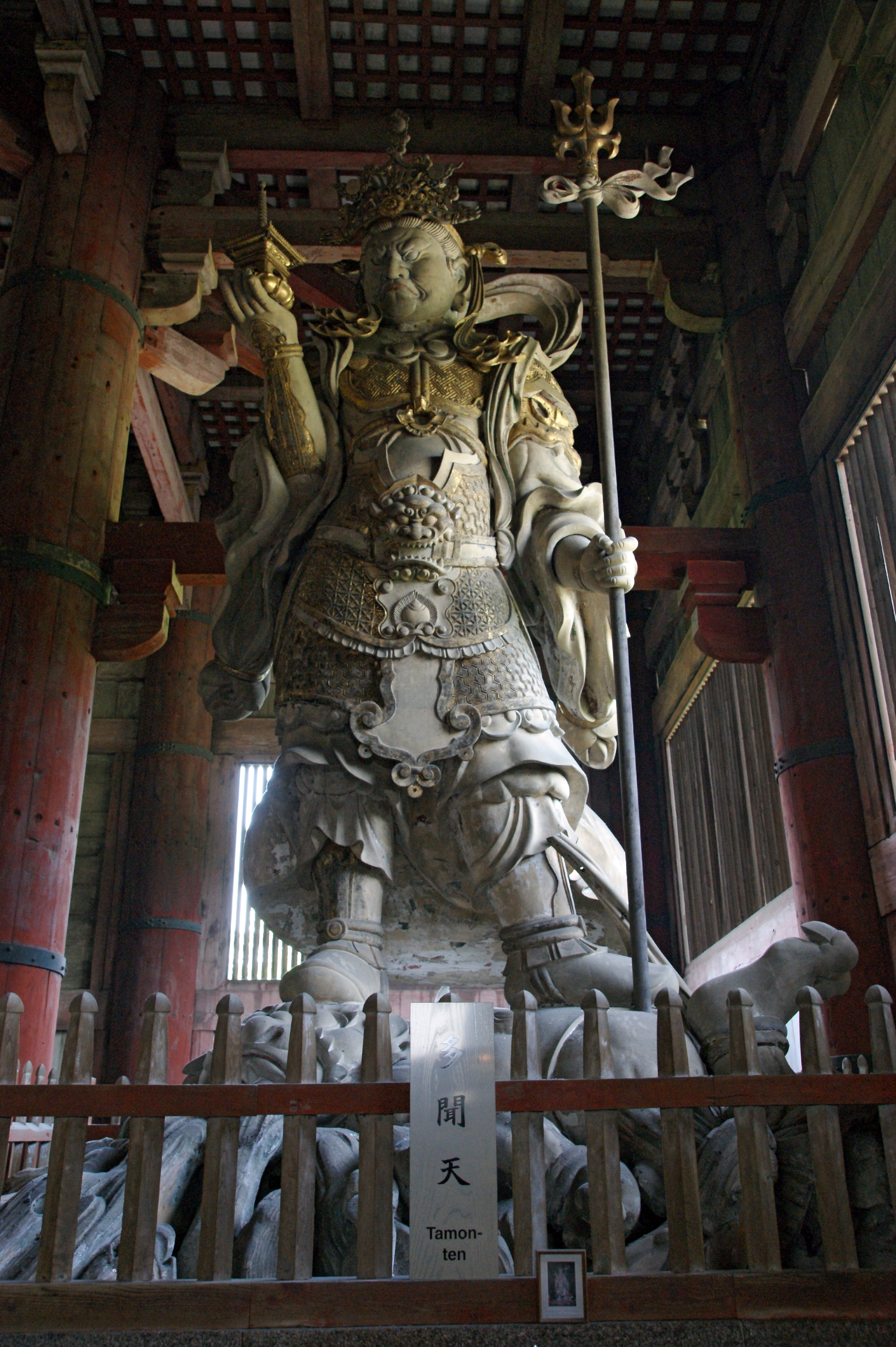
Vaiśravaṇa (Bishamonten), one of the four Heavenly Kings, at Todaiji

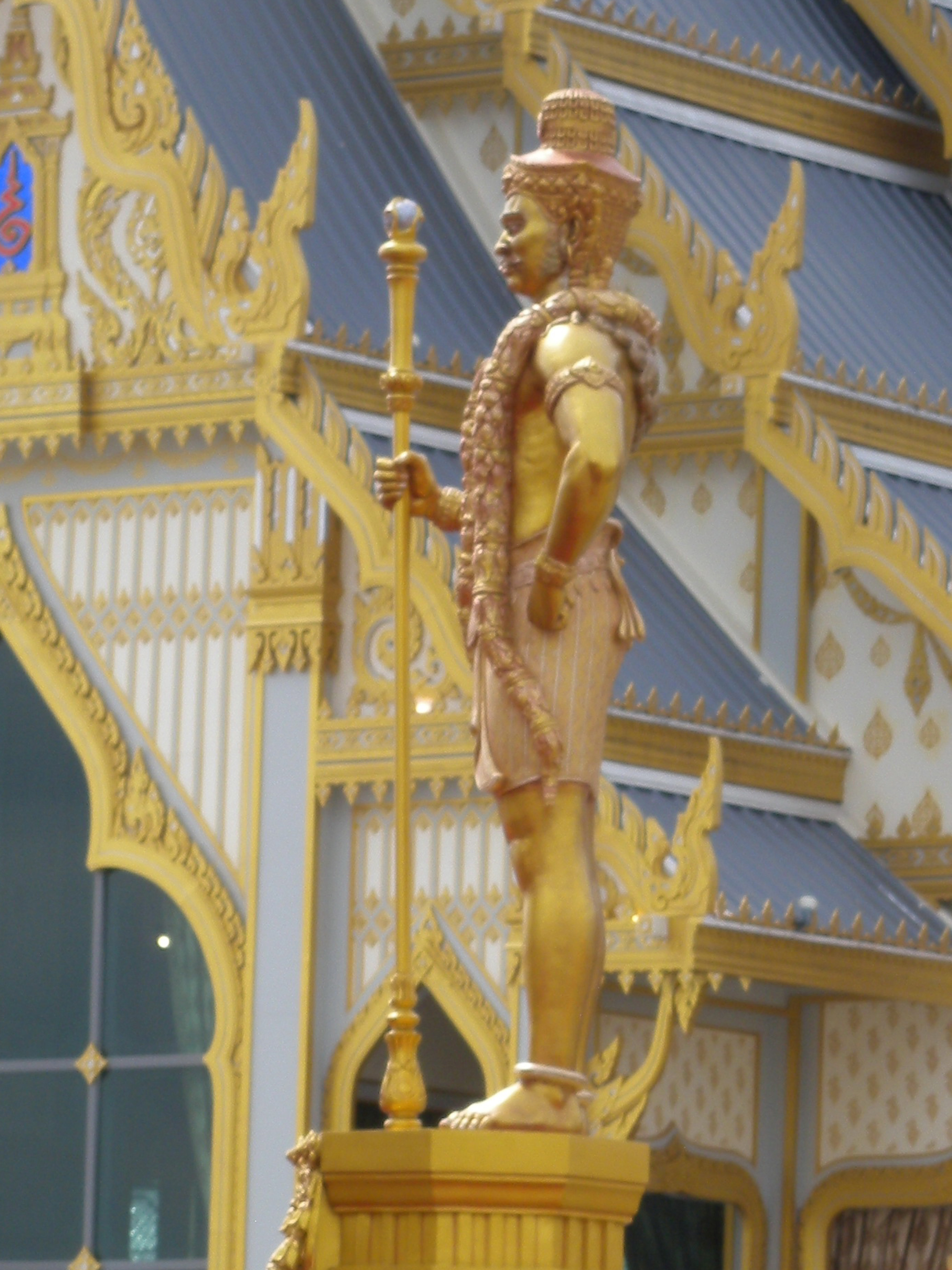
A thai depiction of Vaiśravaṇa (Vessavana).

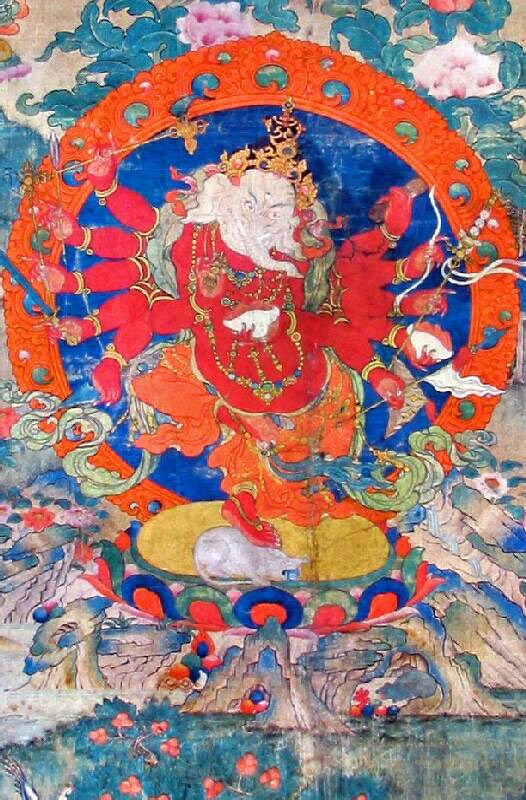
Ganapati

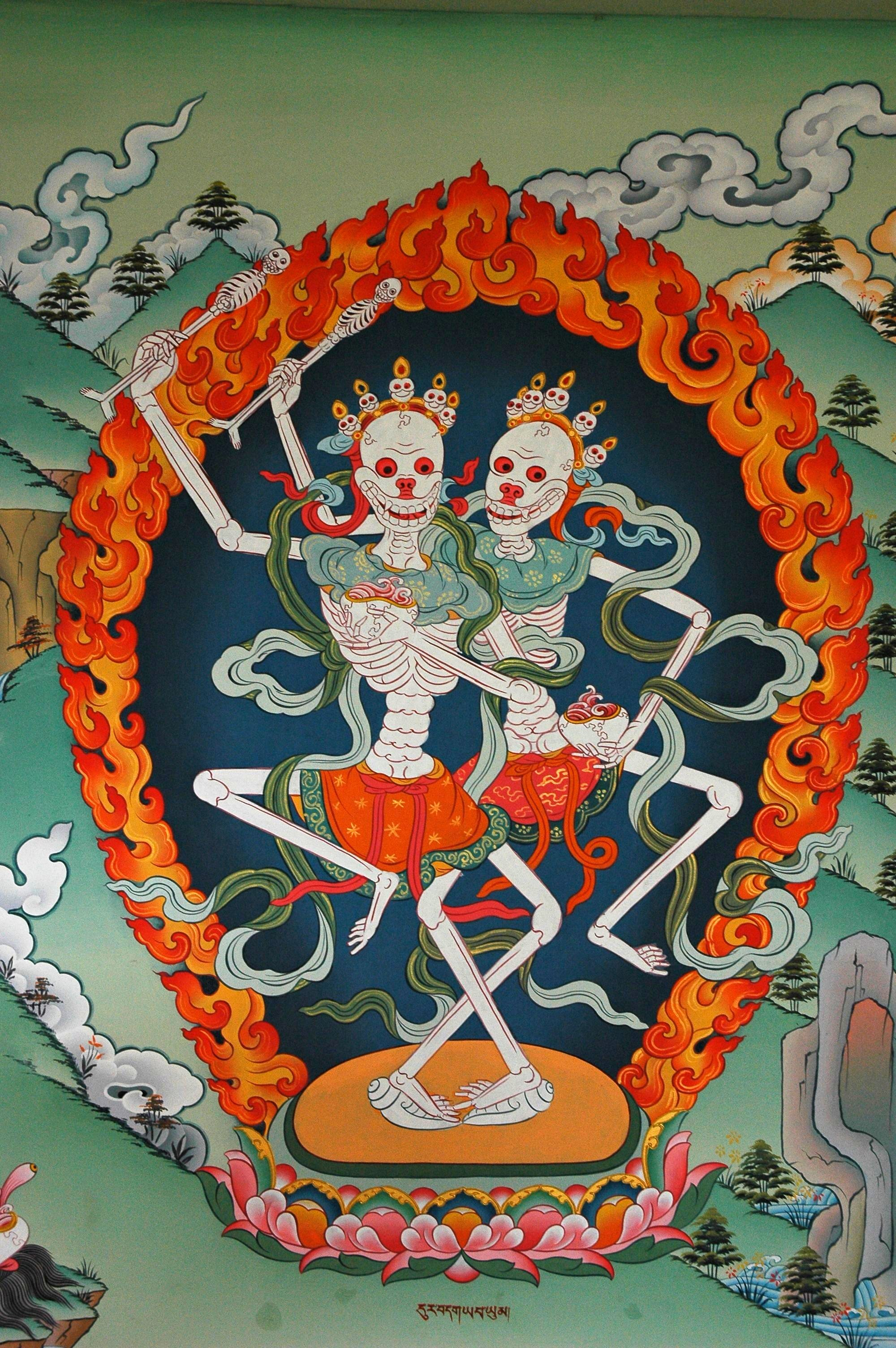
Citipati

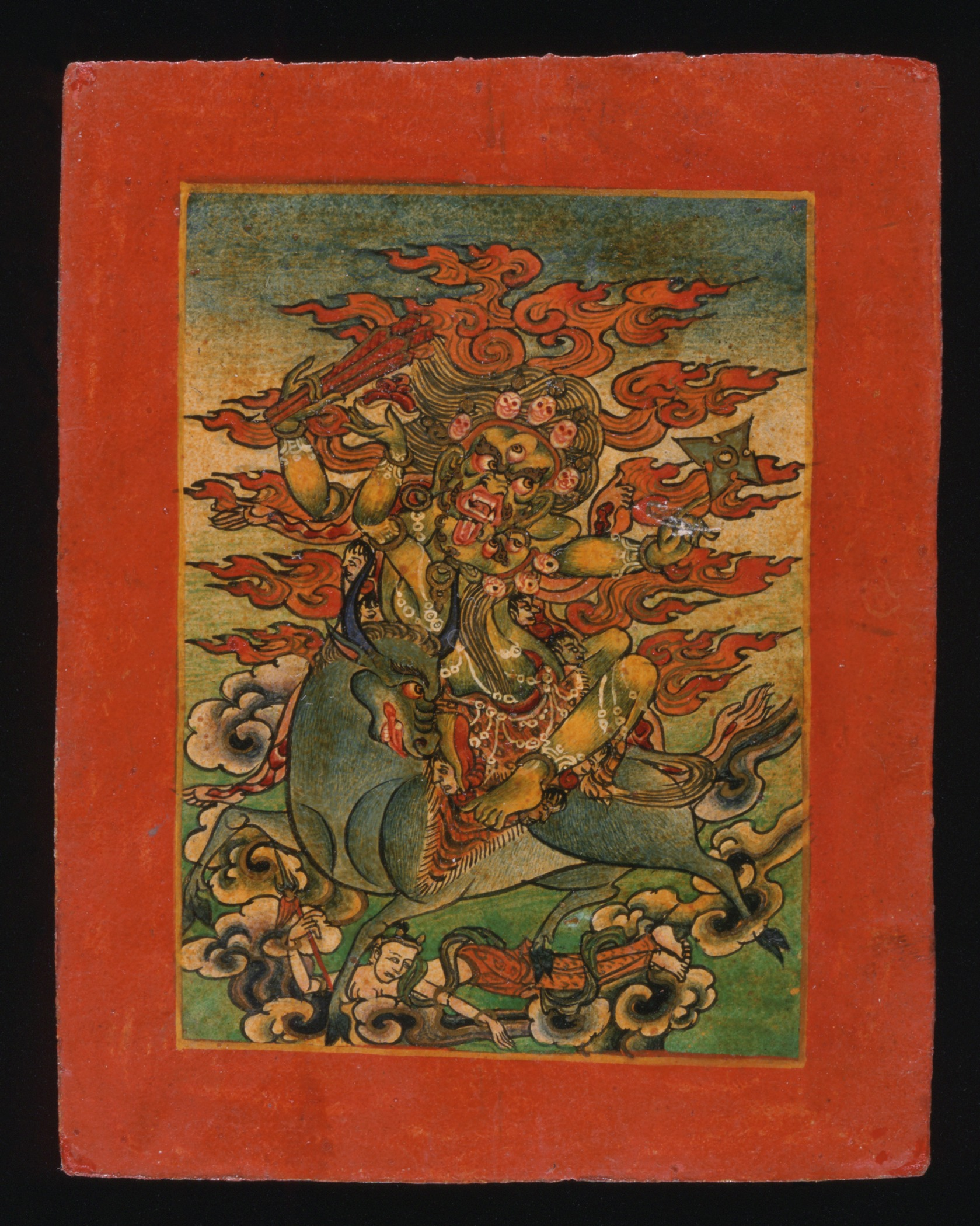
Yama, lord of death

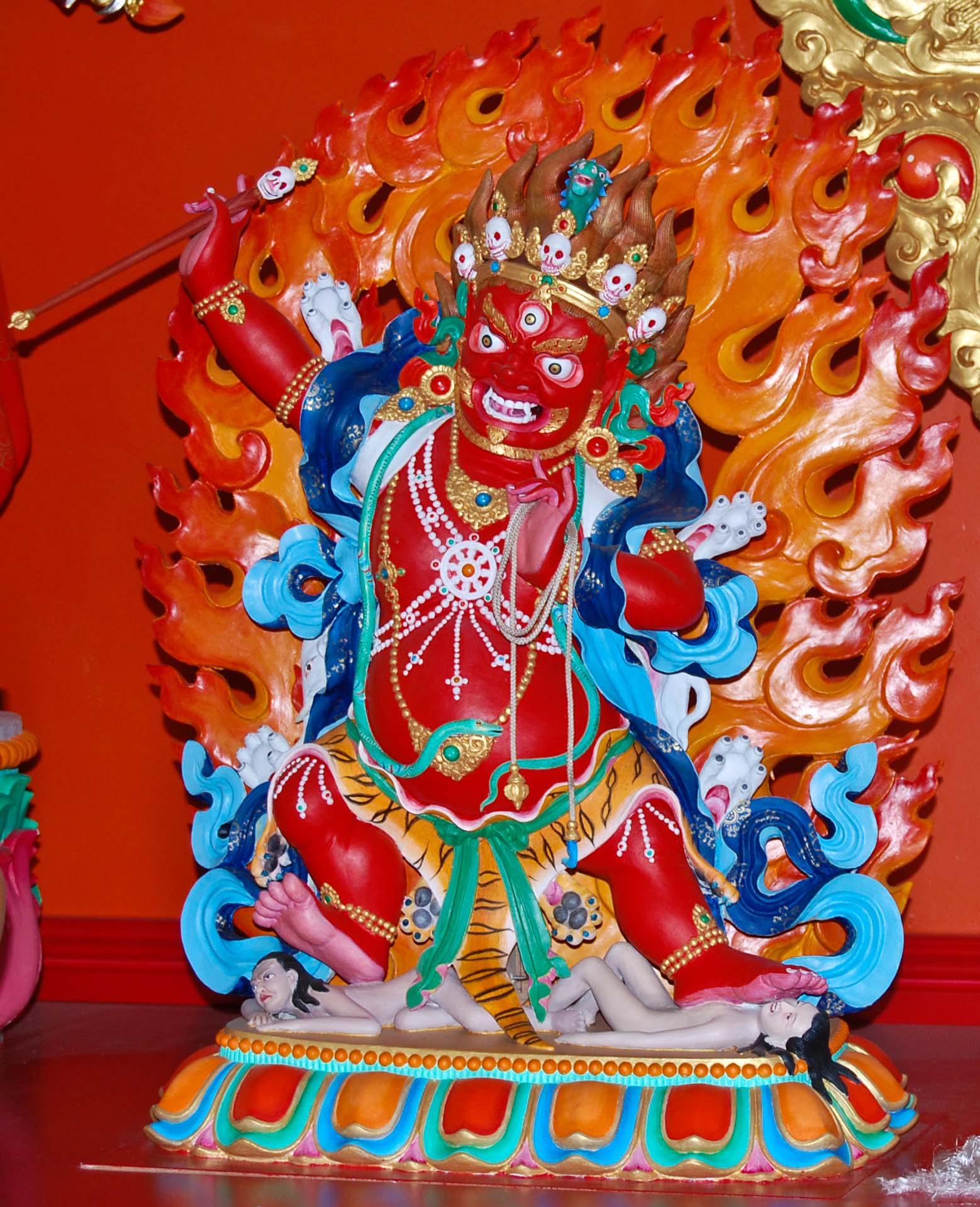
Hayagriva, the "horse-necked"

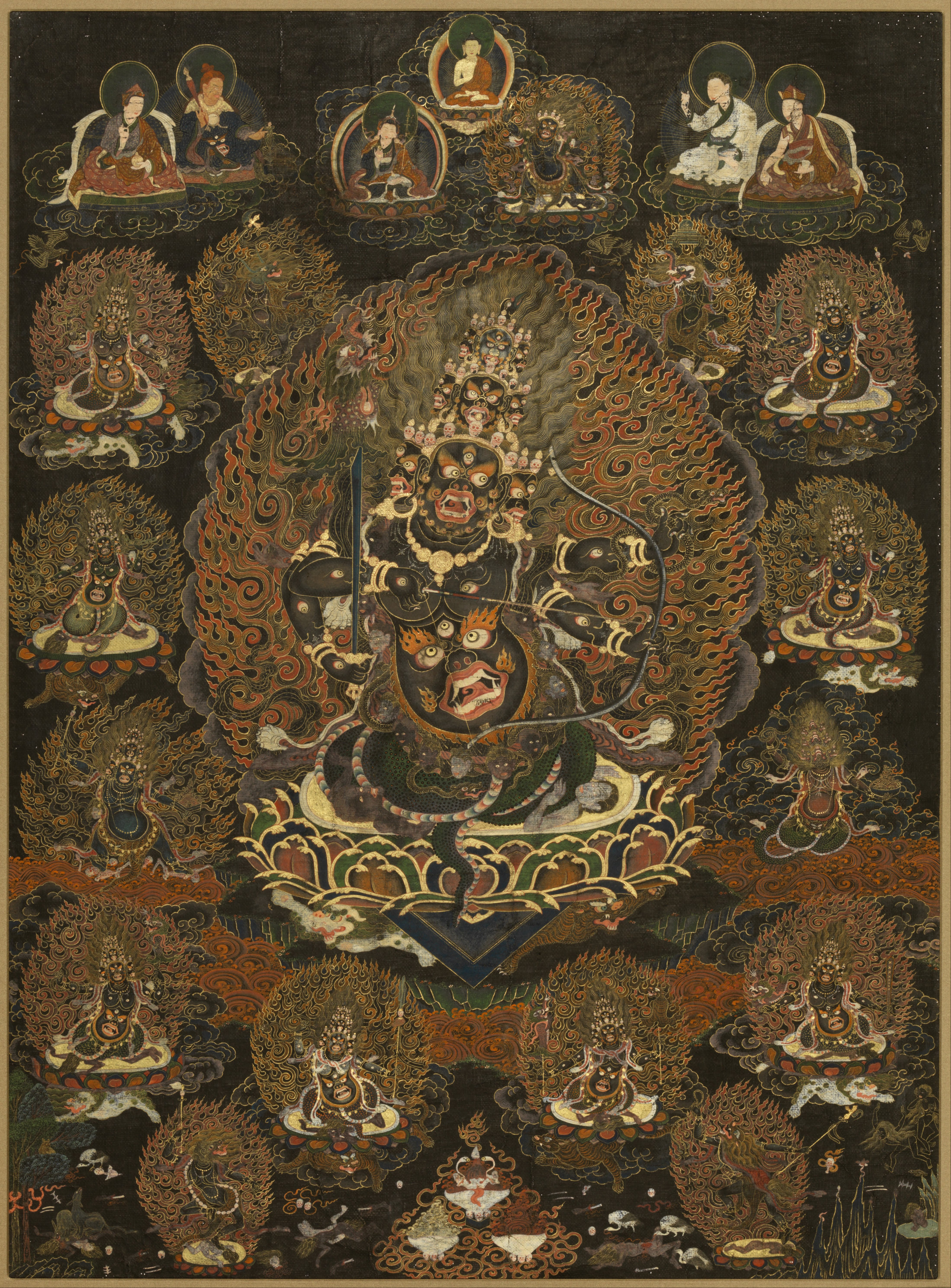
Rahula, an oath-bound protector of Dzogchen

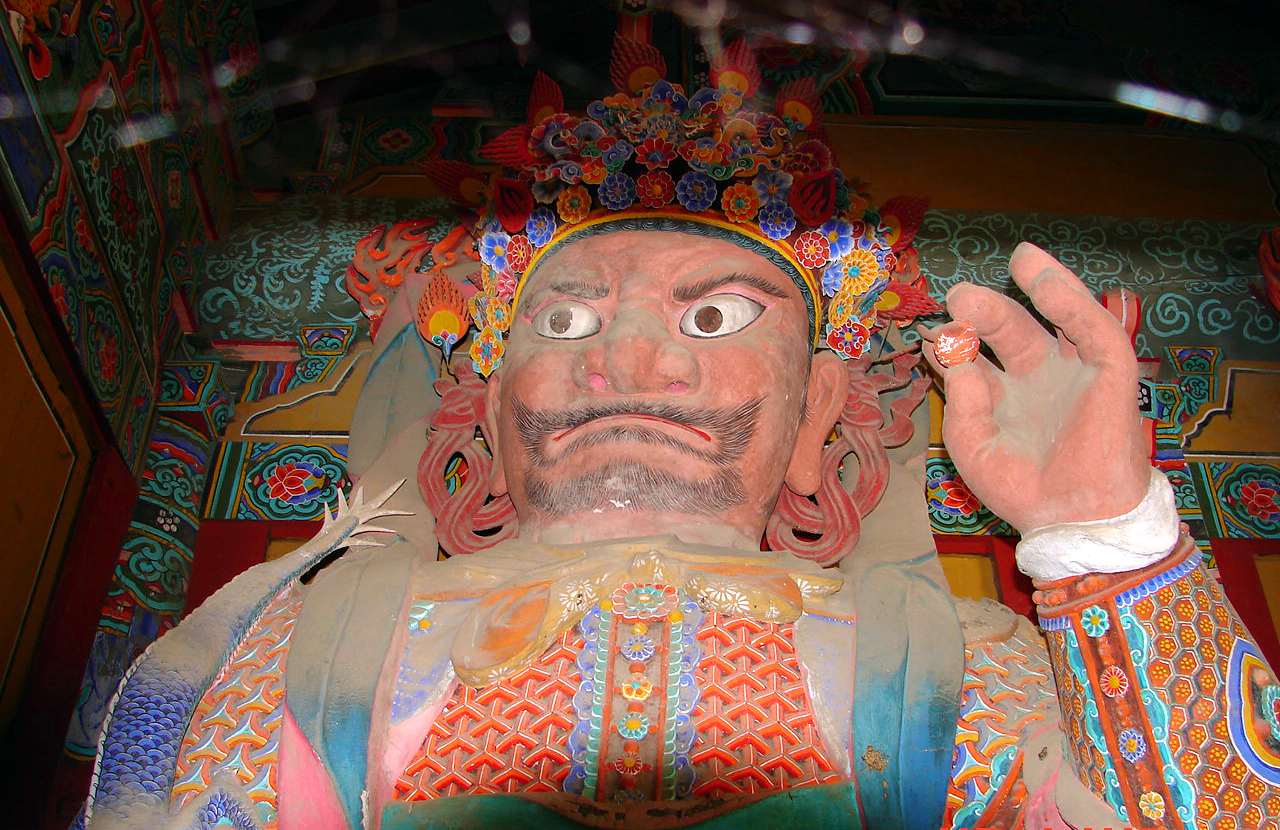
Virūpāksa—King of the West, one of the Four Heavenly Kings at Wolijeongsa, Korea

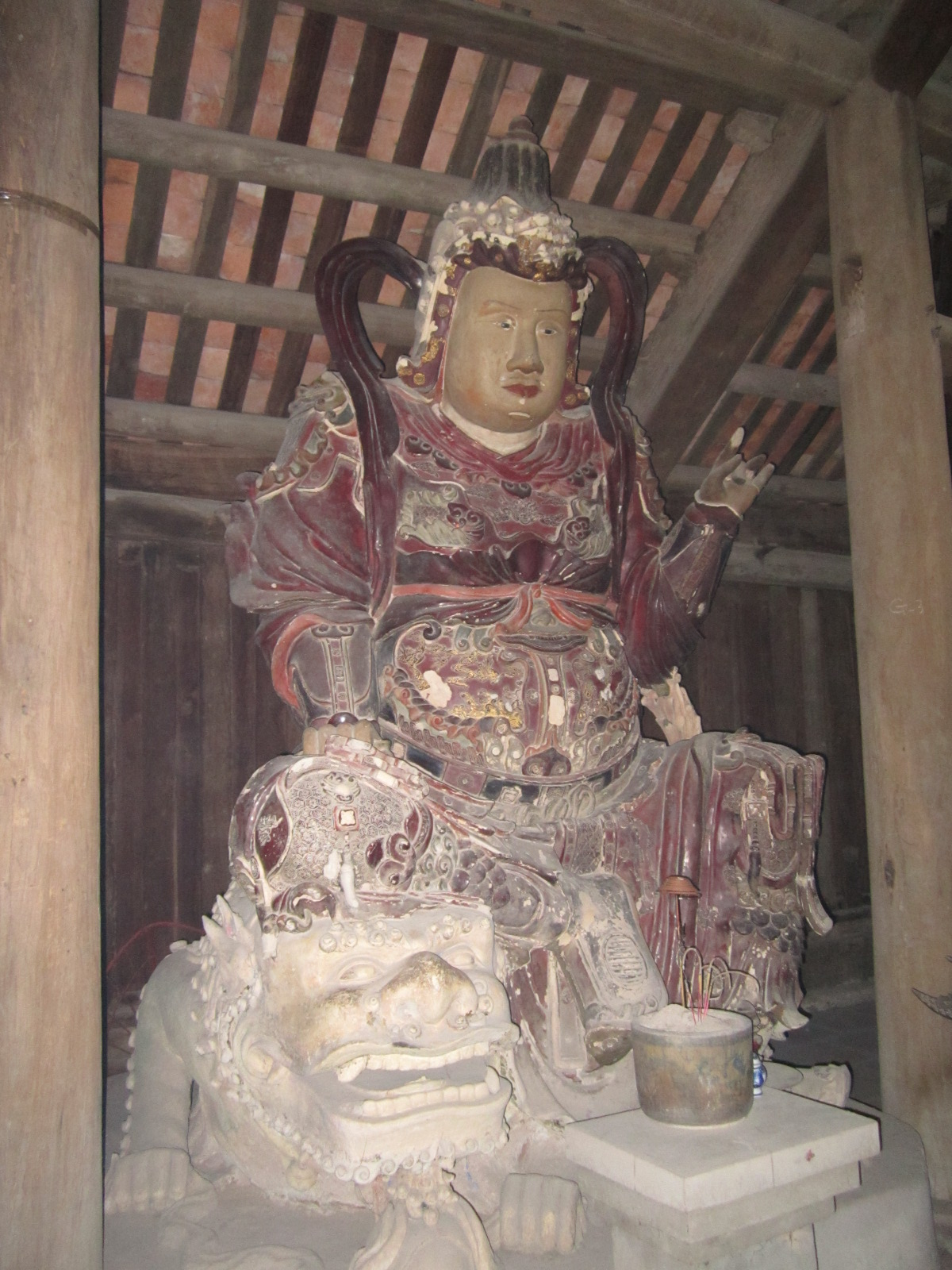
Dharmapala (Hộ pháp in Vietnamese) statue at Bút Tháp Temple, Vietnam

== See also ==
- Buddhist deities
- Chinese mythology
- Hindu mythology
- Japanese mythology
- Korean mythology
- Vietnamese mythology
- Tibetan art

== Sources ==
- Linrothe, Robert N. (1999). Ruthless Compassion: Wrathful Deities in Early Indo-Tibetan Esoteric Buddhist Art. Serindia. ISBN 978-0-906026-51-9.
