= Dharmapala =

Guardian gods of Buddhism

Dharmapāla

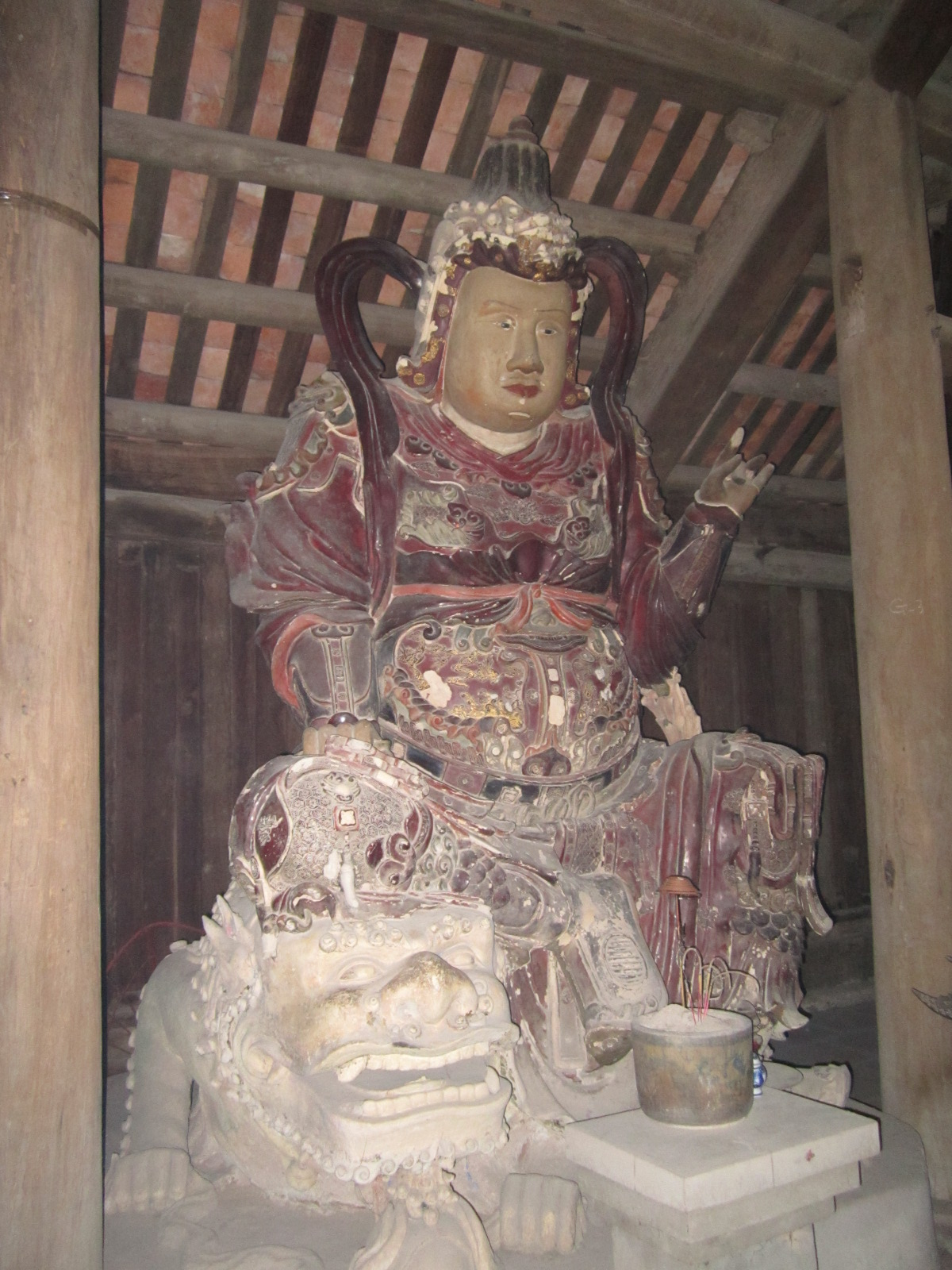
Khuyến Thiện Hộ Pháp (劝善护法, Dharmapāla of Encouraging of Good Deeds), 17th century, Bút Tháp Temple, Vietnam. Khuyến Thiện often stands with the Trừng Ác Dharmapāla to form a pair in Vietnamese Buddhism temples.

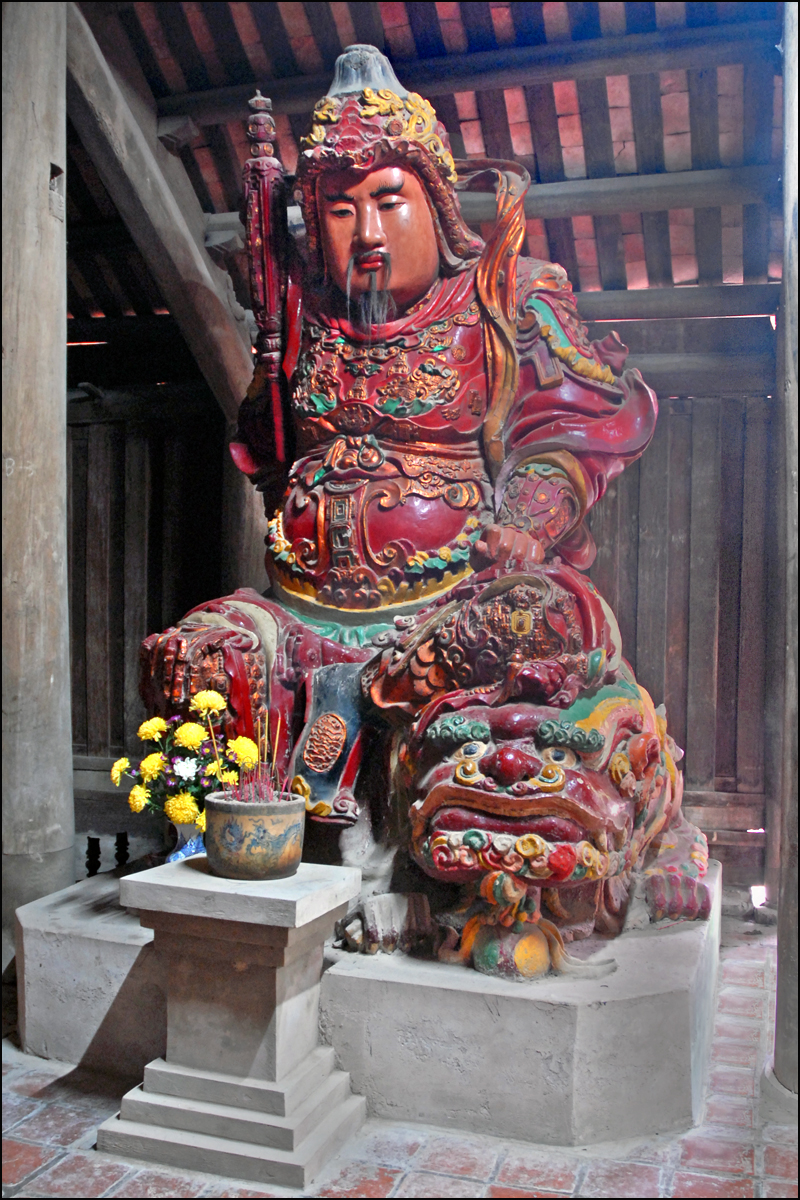
Trừng Ác Hộ Pháp（整恶护法, Dharmapāla of Punishing of Bad Deeds), 17th century, Bút Tháp Temple. Trừng Ác often stands with the Khuyến Thiện Dharmapāla to form a pair in Vietnamese Buddhism temples.

A dharmapāla (Note: Sanskrit: धर्मपाल, Tibetan: ཆོས་སྐྱོང་, Wylie: chos skyong, Chinese: 達磨波羅, 護法神, 護法鬼神, 諸天鬼神, 護法龍天, 諸天善神, pinyin: dámó bōluó, hùfǎ shén, hùfǎ guǐshén, zhūtiān guǐshén, hùfǎ lóngtiān, zhūtiān shànshén, Japanese: 達磨波羅, 護法善神, 護法神, 諸天善神, 諸天鬼神, 諸天善神諸大眷屬, kana: だるまは ら, ごほう ぜんしん, ごほうしん, しょ てんぜんしん, しょ てん きじん, しょ てん ぜんしん しょだい, rōmaji: darumahara, gohō zenshin, gohōshin, shoten zenshin, shoten kijin, shoten zenshin shodaiken, Vietnamese: Hộ Pháp) is a type of wrathful god in Buddhism. The name means "dharma protector" in Sanskrit, and the dharmapālas are also known as the Defenders of the Justice (Dharma), or the Guardians of the Law. There are two kinds of dharmapala, Worldly Guardians (lokapala) and Wisdom Protectors (jnanapala). Only Wisdom Protectors are enlightened beings.

== Description ==
A protector of Buddhist dharma is called a dharmapala. They are typically wrathful deities, depicted with terrifying iconography in the Mahayana and tantric traditions of Buddhism. The wrathfulness is intended to depict their willingness to defend and guard Buddhist followers from dangers and enemies. The Aṣṭagatyaḥ (the eight kinds of nonhuman beings) is one category of dharmapālas, which includes the Garuda, Deva, Naga, Yaksha, Gandharva, Asura, Kinnara, and Mahoraga.

In Vajrayana iconography and thangka depictions, dharmapala are fearsome beings, often with many heads, many hands, or many feet. Dharmapala often have blue, black, or red skin, and a fierce expression with protruding fangs. Although dharmapala have a terrifying appearance, they only act in a wrathful way for the benefit of sentient beings.

The devotional worship of dharmapālas in the Tibetan tradition is traceable to early 8th-century.

=== Tibetan Buddhism ===
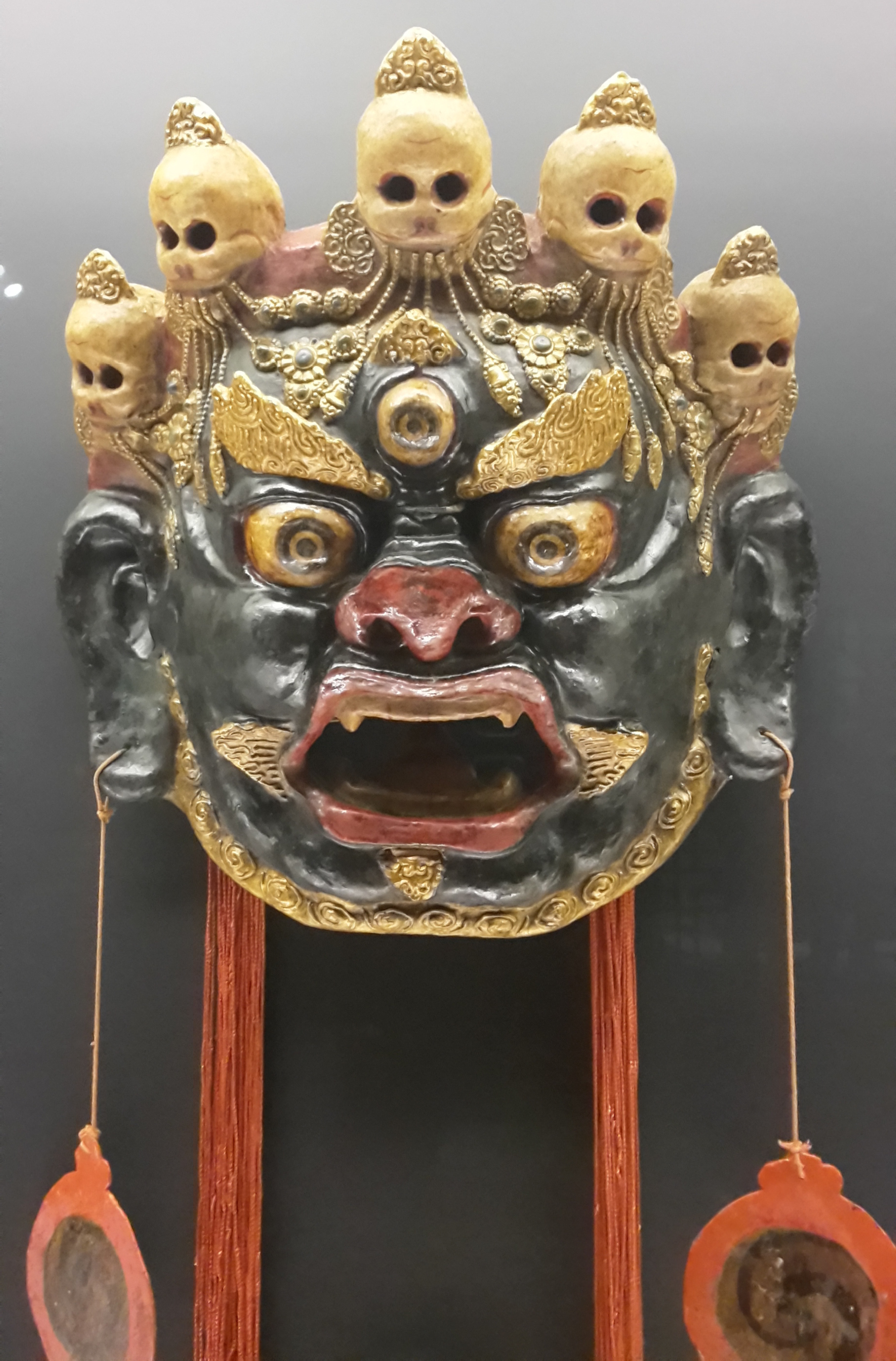
Tibetan (Citipati mask depicting Mahākāla)

There are many different dharmapalas in Tibetan Buddhism. Each school has its own principle dharmapalas and most monasteries have a dedicated dharmapāla which was originally comparable to a genius loci. The many forms of Mahakala are emanations of Avalokiteshvara. Kalarupa and Yamantaka are considered by practitioners to be emanations of Manjushri the Bodhisattva of Wisdom.

Principal wisdom protector dharmapalas include:

- Prana Atma (Tib. Begtse)
- Ekajaṭī (Tib. ral chig ma)
- Mahakala (Tib. Nagpo Chenpo)
- Shri Devi (Tib. Palden Lhamo)
- Yamaraja/Dharmaraja/Kalarupa (Tib. Shinje)

Other dharmapalas include:

- Bhairava (Nepali: भैरव)
- Citipati
- Mahakali
- Yamantaka (Tib. Shinje Shed)
- Hayagriva (Tib. Tamdrin)
- Vaisravana (Tib. Kubera)
- Rāhula (Tib. gza)
- Vajrasādhu (Tib. Dorje Legpa)
- Brahma (Tib. "Tshangs Pa")
- Maharakta (Tib. tsog gi dag po, mar chen)
- Kurukulla (Tib. rig che ma)
- Vajrayakṣa (Takkiraja) (Tib. du pai gyal po)

The main functions of a dharmapāla are said to be to avert the inner and outer obstacles that prevent spiritual practitioners from attaining spiritual realizations, as well as to foster the necessary conditions for their practice.

=== Chinese Buddhism ===
In Chinese Buddhism, the Twenty-Four Protective Deities or the Twenty-Four Devas (Chinese: 二十四諸天; pinyin: Èrshísì Zhūtiān) are a group of gods who are venerated as dharmapālas. In addition, Wisdom Kings such as Acala, Ucchusma, Mahamayuri, and Hayagriva are venerated as dharmapālas as well.

=== Shingon Buddhism ===
In Japanese Shingon Buddhism, a descendant of Tangmi, or Chinese Esoteric Buddhism, dharmapālas such as Acala and Yamantaka are classified as Wisdom Kings. Other dharmapālas, notably Mahakala, belong to the Deva realm, the fourth and lowest class in the hierarchy of honorable beings.

== Related deities ==
In Tibetan Buddhism, there are two other classes of defender, the lokapālas and Kshetrapala Papiya. Guan Yu and Hachiman are also known as defenders.

== See also ==
- Asian witchcraft
- Begtse
- Chenghuangshen
- Door gods, for similar protective East Asian deities
- Gyalpo spirits
- Heng and Ha
- Nio - wrathful guardians of Japanese Buddhist temples
- Palden Lhamo
- Skanda
- Snow Lion
- Vajrapani
