= Citipati (Buddhism) =

Buddhist skeletal protector deities

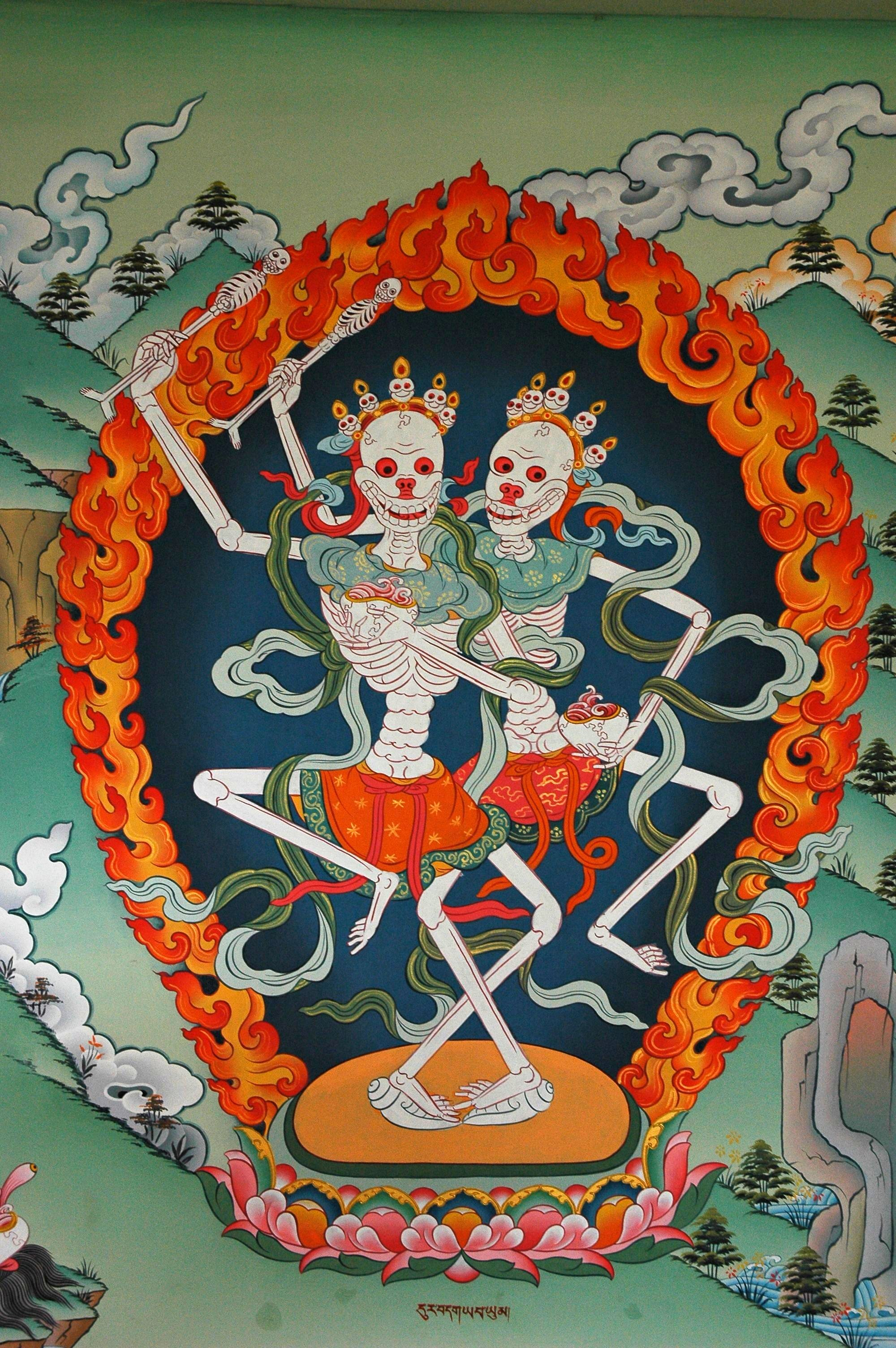
The Citipati as depicted in a painting in the Gelugpa Monastery, Nepal.

Citipati (Sanskrit: चितिपति), Chitipati or Shmashana Adhipati is a protector deity or dharmapala in Tibetan Buddhism and Vajrayana Buddhism of the Himalayas. It is formed of two skeletal deities, one male and the other female, both dancing wildly with their limbs intertwined inside a halo of flames representing change. The Citipati is said to be one of the 75 forms of Mahakala. Their symbol is meant to represent both the eternal dance of death as well as perfect awareness. They are invoked as wrathful deities, benevolent protectors of fierce appearance. The dance of the Citipati is commemorated twice annually in Tibet.

The citipati should not be confused with the skeleton dancers of the Tibetan Buddhist cham dance tradition.

== Legend ==
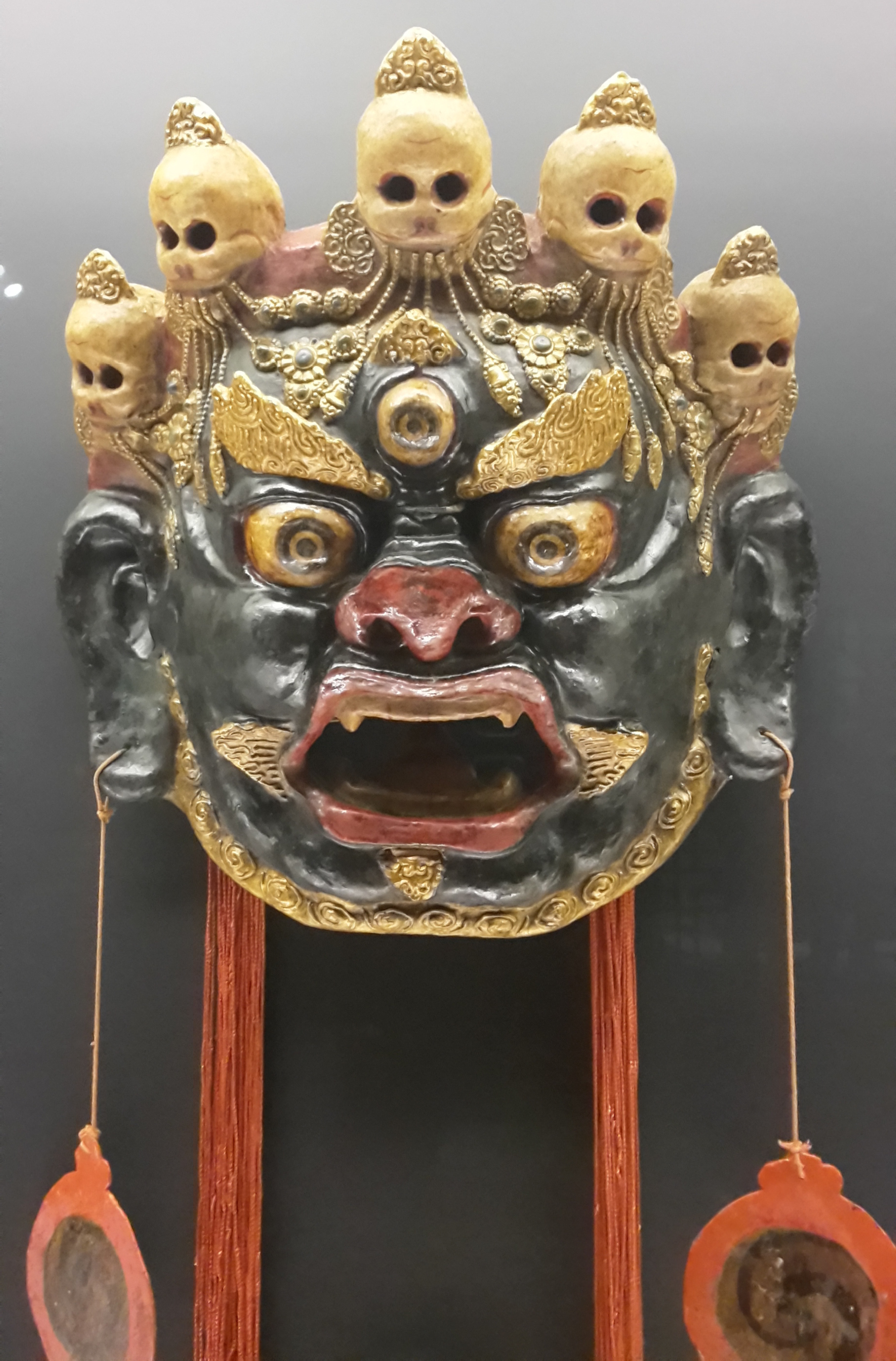
Tibetan Citipati mask depicting Mahākāla. The skull mask of Citipati is a reminder of the impermanence of life and the eternal cycle of life and death.

The Citipati were a couple of ascetics meditating near a graveyard. In their deep state of meditation, they did not notice a thief who had sneaked up on them. The thief beheaded them and threw them into the dirt, which caused them to reach the next stage of ascetic practices. Infuriated by the act, the Citipati swore vengeance to the thief and became the archenemy of thieves and other criminals.

The Citipati cannot leave cemeteries and can only grab thieves passing through them. While waiting for criminals, the Citipati pass their time by dancing and blowing horns, a ritual reenacted by Tibetan monks twice annually. Their dancing also serves as a symbol for death and rebirth, for the Citipati consist of both halves of the human body, male and female. Their skeletal form is a reminder of the impermanence of life and eternal change.

The Citipati is a protector of graveyards and is known as Lord of the Cemetery or Lord of the Crematorium. In Mahayana Buddhism, the Citipati could be interpreted in both of "Śīla Pāramitā" and "Dhyāna pāramitā", but was interpreted it as "Śīla pāramitā" and was placed Mahakala as Deva.
