= Begtse =

Mongol and Tibetan Buddhist deity

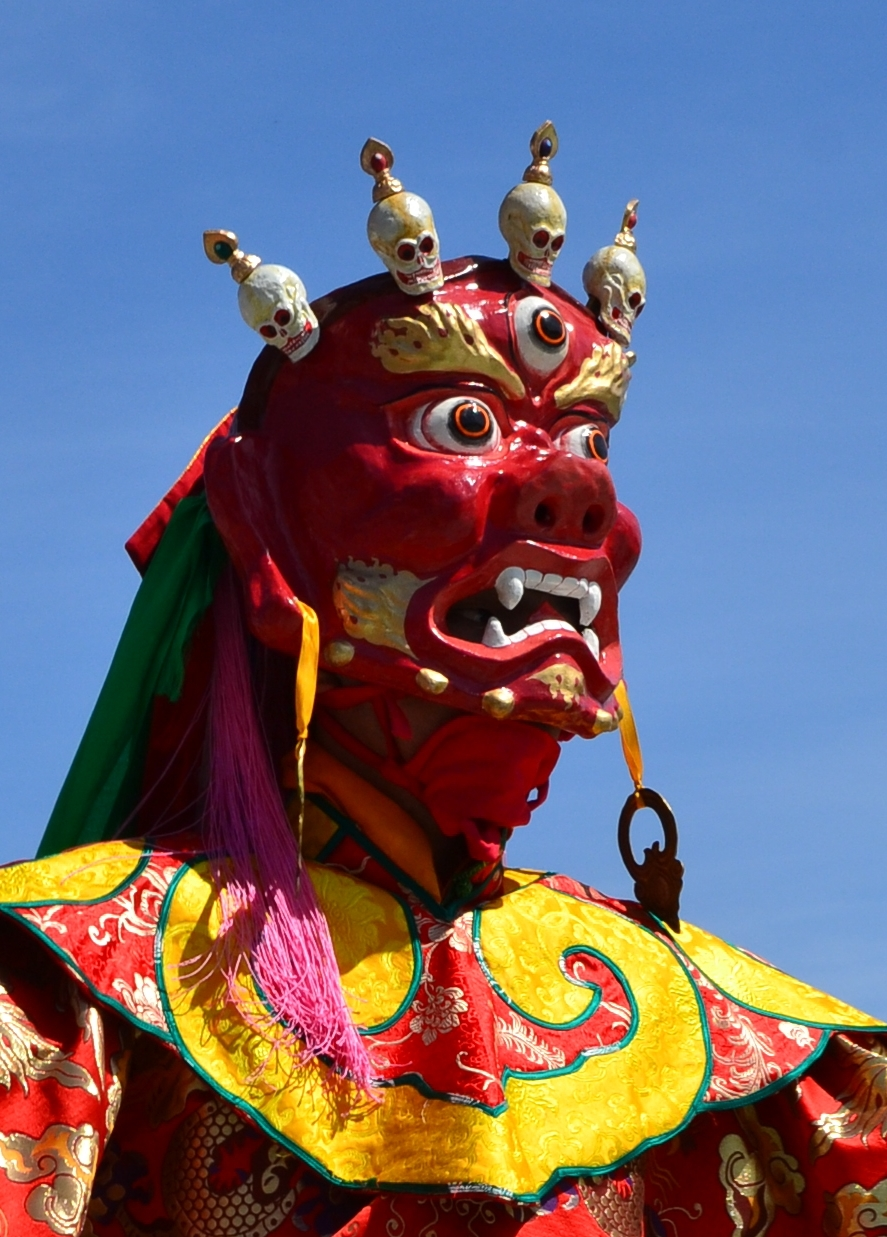
Tsam mask in a performance in Ulan-Ude (2011)

Begtse (Tibetan: བེག་ཚེ་, Wylie: beg tse chen lcam sring; "Begtse the Great Coat of Mail") is a dharmapala and the lord of war in Tibetan Buddhism, originally a pre-Buddhist war god of the Mongols.

== Name ==
The name Begtse is a loanword from Mongolian begder, meaning "coat of mail". He is also given the name and epithet Jamsaran (Tibetan: ལག་མིང་གསུམ་པ་, lCam sring), meaning "Great Coat of Mail", which is a translation of the Mongolian.

== Description ==
Begtse is depicted with red skin and orange-red hair, possessing two arms (as opposed to other Mahākālas, who have four or six), three blood-shot eyes, and wielding a sword in his right hand. In his left hand, he holds a human heart. His right arm also holds a bow and arrow and a halberd with a banner. He wears a chainmail shirt, which gave rise to his name, Jamsaran, and a Mongolian helmet adorned with a crown of five skulls and four banners at the back. He is accompanied by his consort, Rikpay Lhamo, and his main general, Laihansorgodog. Surrounding them are Jamsaran's satellites, the twenty-nine butchers.

== Culture ==
Jamsaran is represented in Mongolian, and to a lesser extent Tibetan, Cham dance.

== See also ==
- Beg tse, a ceratopsian dinosaur named after the deity
- King Gesar, regarded as an incarnation of Jamsaran
- Roman von Ungern-Sternberg, called an incarnation of Jamsaran by his followers

== General and cited references ==
- Chiodo, Elisabetta (2000). "The Mongolian Manuscripts on Birch Bark from Xarbuxyn Balgas in the Collection of the Mongolian Academy of Sciences". Asiatische Forschungen. 137. ISBN 9783447042468. ISSN 0571-320X.
- Pegg, Carole (2001). Mongolian Music, Dance, & Oral Narrative. ISBN 9780295981123.
