= Bút Tháp Temple =

Buddhist temple in Vietnam

Coordinates: 21°03′39″N 106°01′20″E

Bút Tháp Temple (Vietnamese: Chùa Bút Tháp, chữ Hán: 寧福寺, Ninh Phúc tự) is a Buddhist temple located near the dyke of the Đuống River, Thuận Thành District, Bắc Ninh Province, Vietnam. The temple is also popularly called Nhạn Tháp Temple. The temple was built in the 13th century. The temple houses the biggest Quan Âm statue with one thousand eyes and a thousand arms. Bút Tháp Temple is one of the most famous temples in Vietnam. Inside, there are various valuable ancient objects and statues, which are considered to be Vietnamese masterpieces of 17th-century wood carving. During the same time the temple had become famous for the venerable abbot and Zen master Chuyết Chuyết ("thiền sư Thích Chuyết Chuyết") 1590 - 1644.

The complex has 10 buildings spreading for 100 meters from the three-entrance gate to the bell-tower and back house. Inside the temple are more than 50 statues of different sizes including the Triad Buddha, Manjusri (Văn Thù) on a blue lion and Samantabhadra (Phổ Hiền) on a white elephant. The most remarkable is the thousand-handed and thousand-eyed Quan Âm, which is described as a sculptural masterpiece of Vietnam.

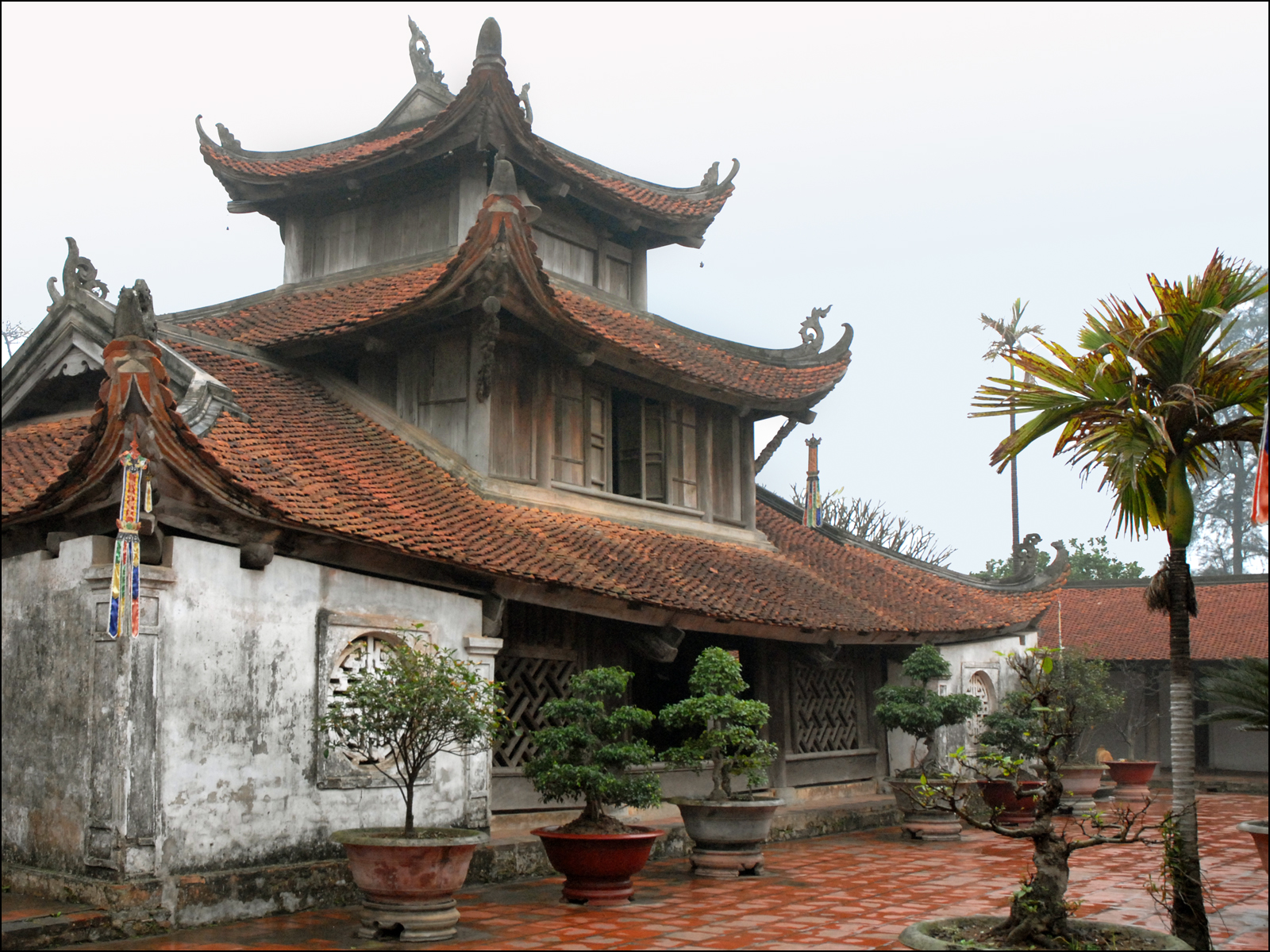
Bút Tháp Temple

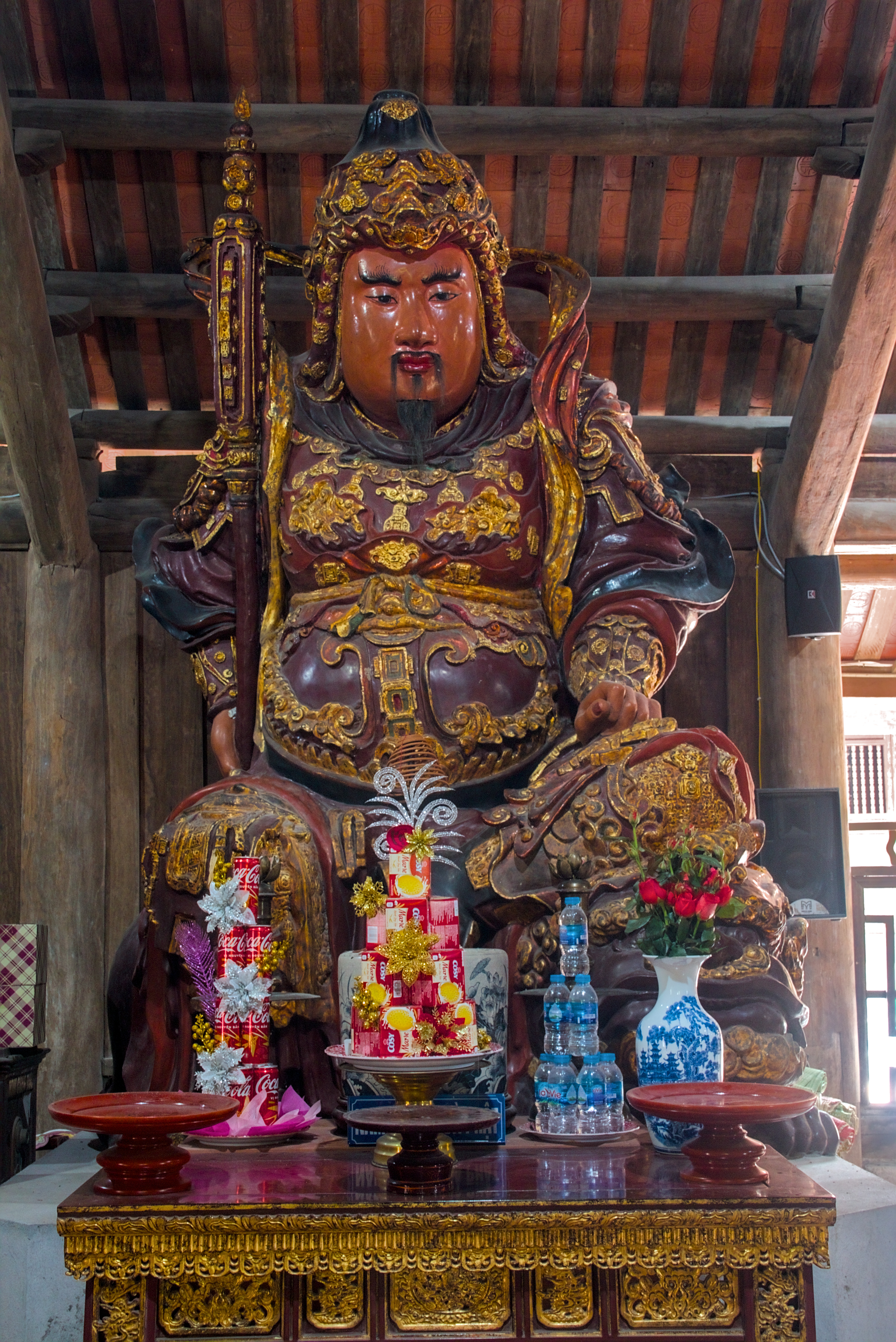
One of the 17th-century wood statues displayed inside the main building.

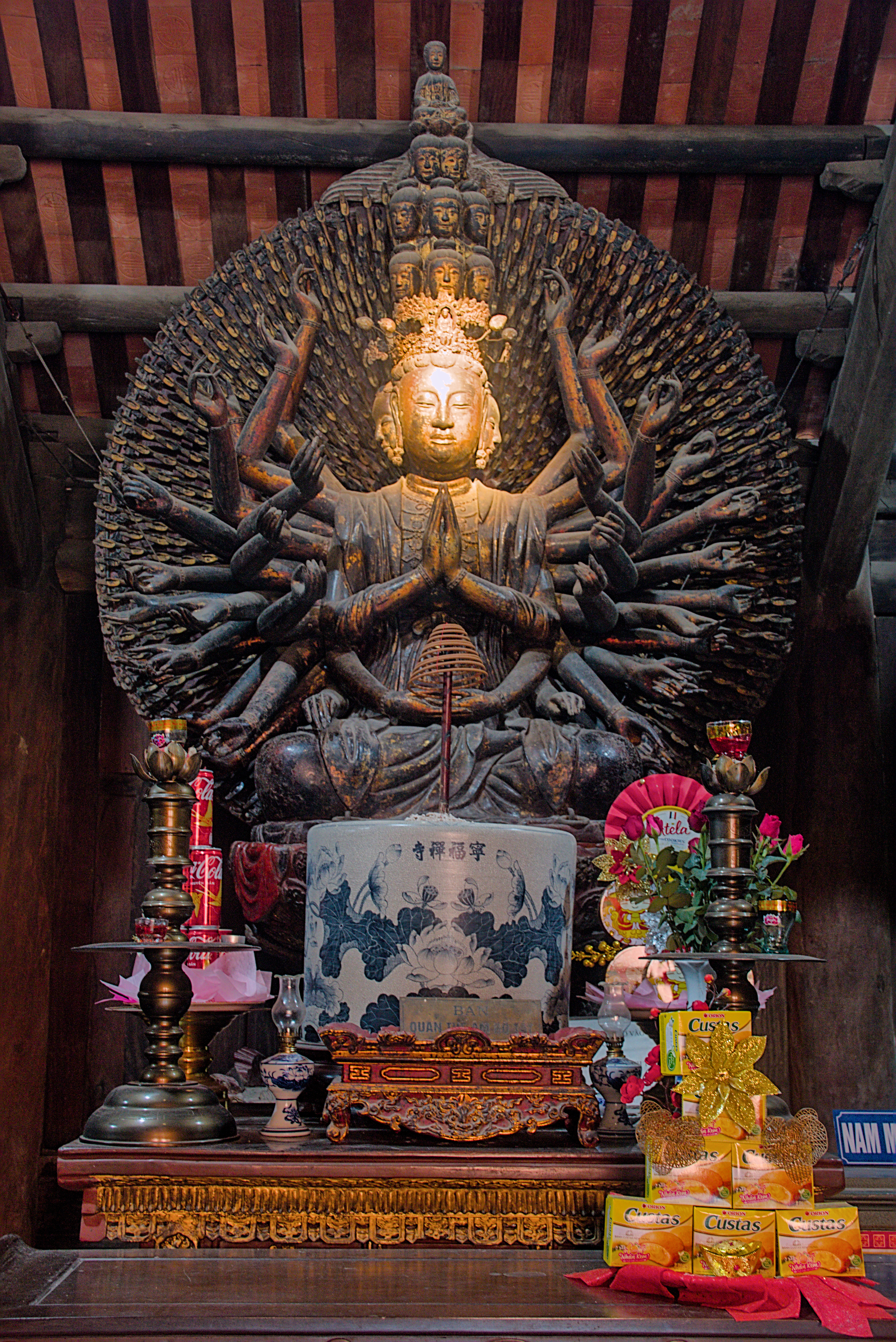
The thousand-handed and thousand-eyed Guanyin.

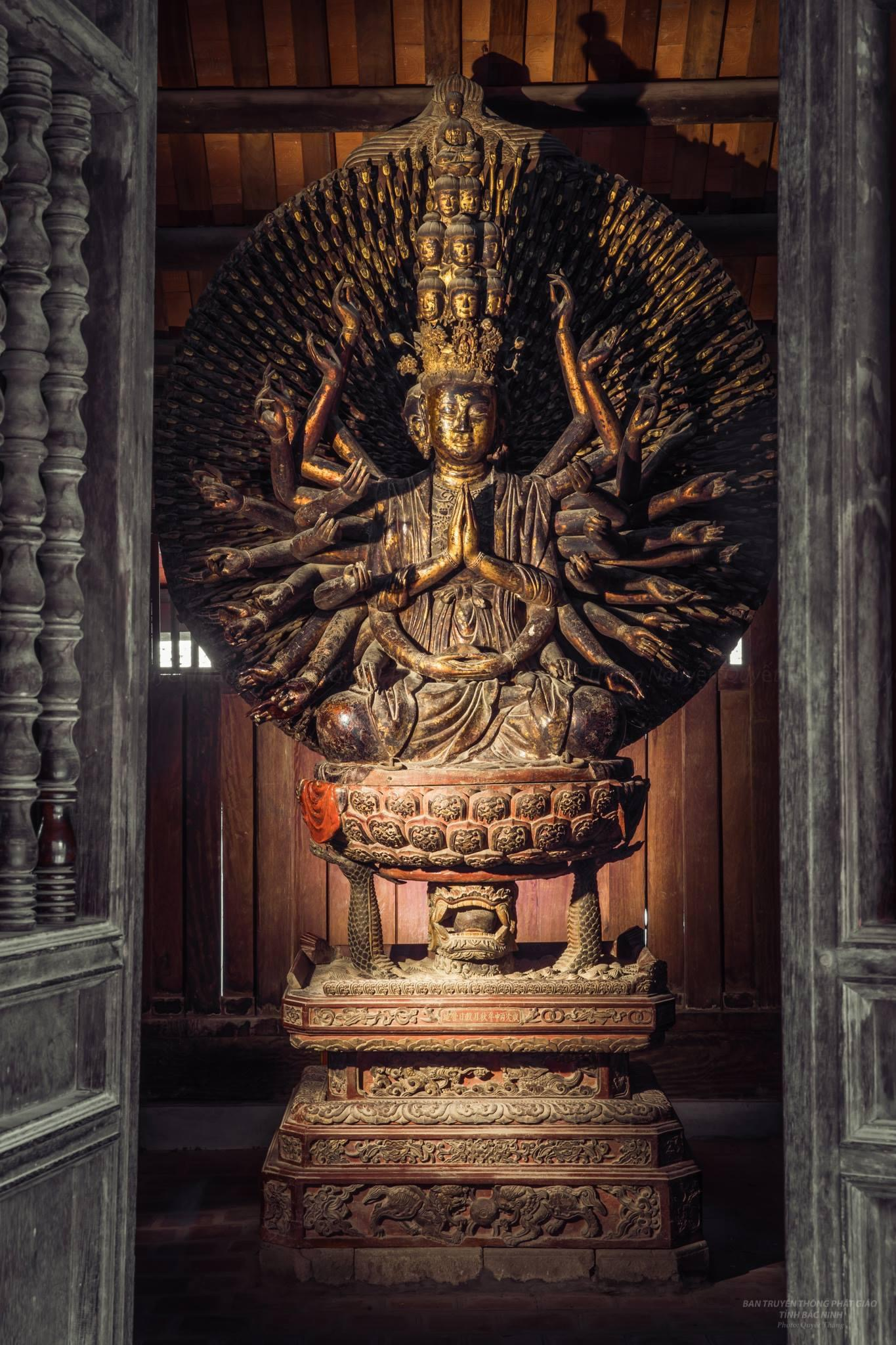
The thousand-handed and thousand-eyed Guanyin.

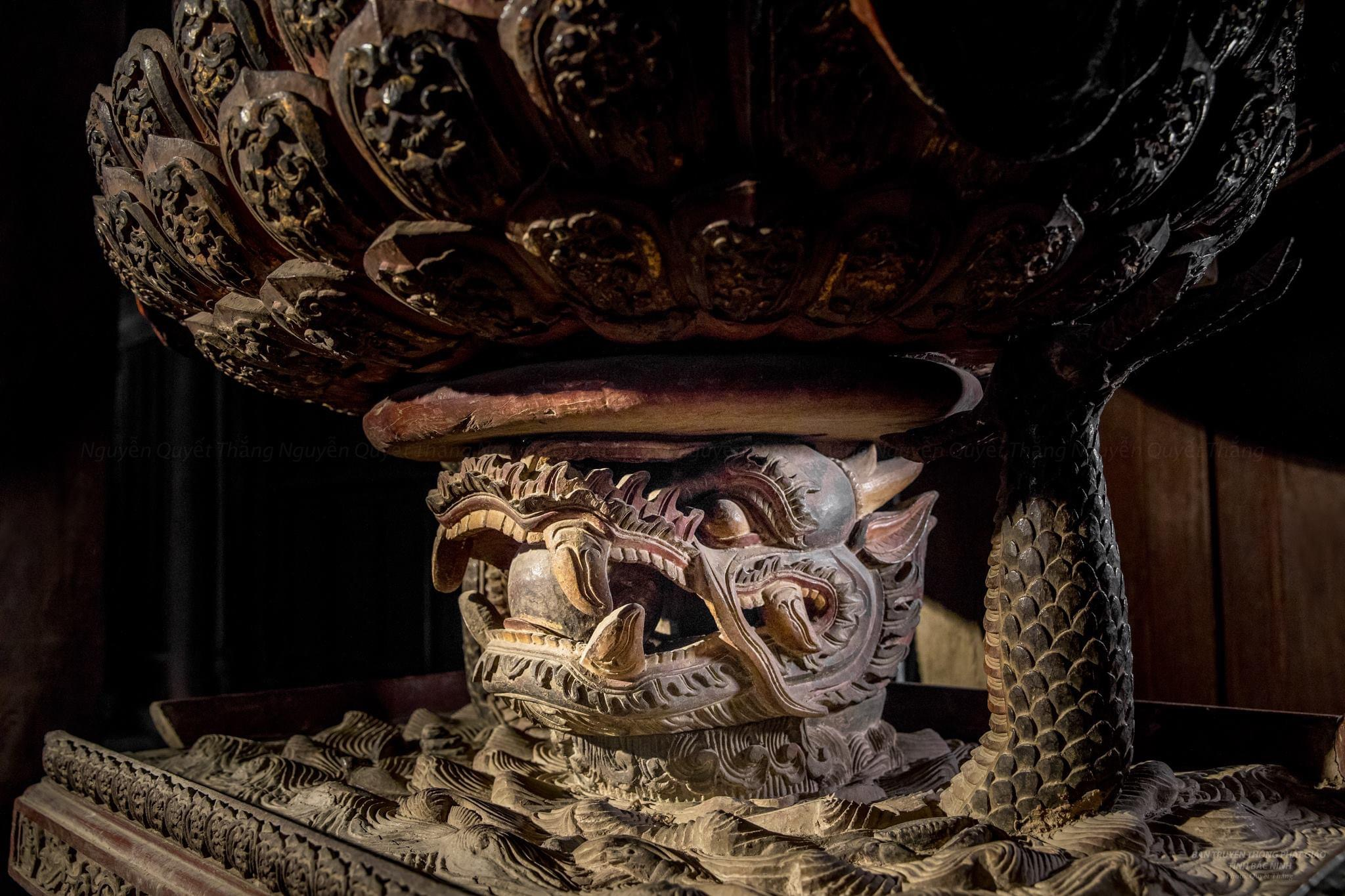

The architecture, sculpture and decoration of the temple were exclusively confined to the 17th century, so it was the best intact and typical example of Vietnam's classical Buddhist art.
