= Robert Lawlor =

American mythographer (1938–2022)

Robert Lawlor (August 11, 1938 – November 29, 2022) was an American mythographer, symbologist and New Age author of several books.

== Life and career ==
Robert Lawlor was born in Schenectady, New York on August 11, 1938.

After training as a painter and a sculptor, he became a yoga student of Sri Aurobindo and lived for many years in Puducherry, where he was a founding member of Auroville. In India, he discovered the works of the French Egyptologist and esotericist, R. A. Schwaller de Lubicz, which led him to explore the principles and practices of ancient sacred science.

Between 1965 and 1968, Robert met his wife, Deborah Lawlor. In 1972, they left Auroville for a year so Robert could study sacred geometry and read Sri Aurobindo. They came back to Auroville in 1973 until 1975.

In 1979, Lawlor (then living in Tasmania) participated in the Lindisfarne Fellows Conference, held at Zen Center's Green Gulch Farm, with Keith Critchlow from London. In 1980, Lawlor met together with William Irwin Thompson and Rachel Fletcher to teach in the Lindisfarne Institute's Summer Program in Sacred Architecture, which provided the context for the design and building of the Lindisfarne Chapel. Critchlow's Twelve Criteria for Sacred Architecture derives from a lecture given at this time. In 1981, a gathering of about 50 members of the Lindisfarne Association met in Crestone, Colorado under the name, Homage to Pythagoras, which included Lawlor, Thompson, Fletcher, Critchlow, Christopher Bamford, Arthur Zajonc, Anne Macaulay, Kathleen Raine, Robert Bly, Joscelyn Godwin, John Michell, and Ernest McClain.

Robert Lawlor died on King Island, Tasmania on November 29, 2022, at the age of 84. His is buried alongside his third wife, author Johanna Lambert.

== Published works ==
- The Temple in Man, R. A. Schwaller de Lubicz (translated by Robert and Deborah Lawlor), Inner Traditions, 1977, ISBN 0-89281-570-1 (1982)
- Symbol and the Symbolic: Ancient Egypt, Science, and the Evolution of Consciousness, R. A. Schwaller de Lubicz (translated by Robert and Deborah Lawlor), 1978, ISBN 0-89281-022-X
- Mathematics useful for understanding Plato, Theon of Smyrna, Platonic Philosopher, translated from the 1892 Greek/French edition of J. Dupuis by Robert and Deborah Lawlor, Secret Doctrine Reference Series, Wizards Bookshelf, San Diego, 1979
- Lindisfarne Letter 10: Geometry and Architecture, 1980
- Lindisfarne Letter 12: The Lindisfarne Chapel, 1981
- Lindisfarne Letter 14: Homage to Pythagoras, 1982, ASIN B000H06P2U
- Sacred Geometry: Philosophy and practice, Thames & Hudson, 1989 (1st edition 1979, 1980, or 1982), ISBN 0-500-81030-3
- Earth Honoring: The New Male Sexuality, Park Street Press, 1991, ISBN 0-89281-428-4
- Voices of the First Day: Awakening in the Aboriginal dreamtime, Rochester, Vermont: Inner Traditions International, Ltd., 1991, ISBN 0-89281-355-5
- Homage to Pythagoras: Rediscovering Sacred Science, Christopher Bamford, 1994, ISBN 0-940262-63-0 (features 2 of Lawlor's essays, Ancient Temple Architecture and Pythagorean Number as Form, Color, and Light from the early 1980s Lindisfarne Letters)
- The Geometry of the End of Time, Robert Lawlor (2015), ISBN 0646936573

== See also ==
- Sacred geometry
- Bija
- Guruwari
- Lotus (symbolism)
- Mimi (folklore)
- Maban
- Rainbow Serpent
