= Y. Misdaq =

Y. Misdaq a.k.a. Yoshi
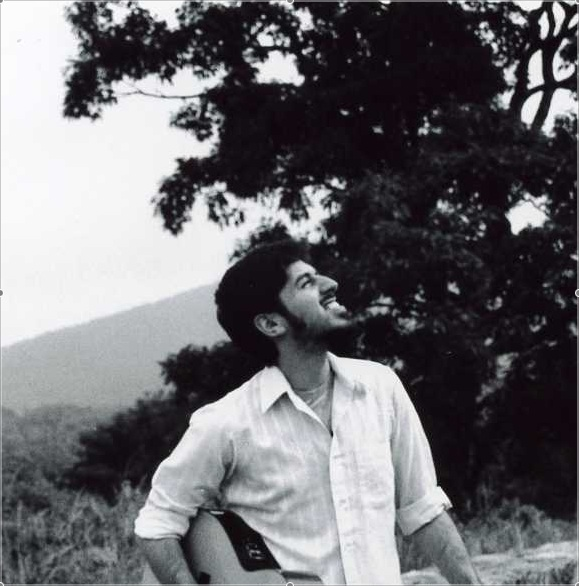
- photograph – Janine Storm van Leeuwen

Background information
- Origin: Brighton, England
- Genres: Hip-hop, electronica, folk. Fiction, poetry, Non-Fiction. Observational documentary.
- Instruments: Samples, vocals, keyboard, guitar
- Years active: 2002–present
- Label: Nefisa UK
- Website: www.yusufmisdaq.com

Y. Misdaq, also known as Yoshi, is an Afghan-English multimedia artist, writer, creative consultant, and founder of the art website Nefisa and the independent media label Nefisa UK. Since 2004 he has released four albums, three documentaries, and three novels, and from 2010 to 2012 worked on a poetry series (six separate volumes of poetry) as well as appearing on numerous works, either anonymously or under different pseudonyms as writer, filmmaker, and performer.

Y. Misdaq has been featured in magazines such as The Wire, Hip-Hop Connection, Stylus, The Brighton Source, and numerous others. Upon the publication of his debut novel in June 2007, Misdaq's work was also featured on BBC Television & Radio. On September 18, 2009, he was featured on NPR in the United States. and PRI internationally.

Misdaq was present in Benghazi at the onset of the 2011 Libyan civilian uprising against Muammar Gaddafi, which he covered alongside Anjali Kamat for Democracy Now!.

== Discography ==
=== Albums ===
- From a Western Box (2004)
- Flowers & Trees (2005)
- The Hearing (compilation LP for charity Muslimyouth.net )(2005)
- Hippocamp Ruins Sgt. Peppers Lonely Hearts Club Band (mash-up LP with MichL Britsch & Fredo Viola et al.) (2006)
- Le Dual Mule: Experiments in Improvisational Sound (duet LP with Mikrosopht) (2006)
- Maghreb Isha & Space (2010)
- If You Ask Me, Yes (2013)
- Misted Almond Legacy (2017)

== Bibliography ==
=== Novels ===
- Pieces of a Paki: A Beautiful Story (2007; Nefisa UK/University of Sussex press). Novel ISBN 978-0-9555024-0-8
- Narayan (2007). Novel, as yet unpublished. Nominated by Penguin for the 2011 Muslim Writers Award, also short-listed in the best unpublished novel category.
- The Steep Ascent (2010). Online book & novel.

=== Poetry ===
- Frozen Fountain (2008). Art book, collaboration with German photographer Harry Nizard
- Brighton Streets (2010; Nefisa UK). The first in a six-part series of poetry books.
- Into Solidity (2011; Nefisa UK). A book of poems and illustrations.
- The Butterfly Gate (2011; Nefisa UK). Poems and illustrations.
- Spilling Kingdoms (2011; Nefisa UK). The fourth book in the poetry series, with a foreword from Ernest G. McClain, professor of music and mathematician.
- The Beautiful / Palace Prayers (2011; Nefisa UK). The fifth book in the series, with an introduction by Christopher Reiger. The book is separated into two parts; the latter half is a reproduction of the 2009 art/blog project by the same name featured on NPR. Misdaq wrote the blog under the pseudonym of 'Man in Palace'.
- Lefke Automatic / Destiny of Love (2012; Nefisa UK). The sixth installment of the series starts off as a travelogue of Misdaq's journey to find a living Sufi master in the Mediterranean. The book was praised by Khaled Hosseini, who said, "This is lovely, moving work, with a sense of mystery, and the possibility of unexpected discovery, forever at hand. At times open ended, elusive, and abstract, Yusuf Misdaq's poems can also be bold, emphatic, and unafraid."
