= Ekādaśamukha =

Form of Buddhist bodhisattva Avalokitesvara

Ekādaśamukha (Eleven-Faced Avalokiteśvara)
- Colossal Liao dynasty (916 - 1125) clay statue of Shiyimian Guanyin, in Dule Temple, Tianjin, China.
- Sanskrit: एकादशमुख (IAST) Ekādaśamukha
- Chinese: (Traditional) 十一面觀音(菩薩) (Simplified) 十一面观音(菩萨) (Pinyin: Shíyīmiàn Guānyīn (Púsà))
- Japanese: 十一面観音(菩薩)(じゅういちめんかんのんぼさつ) (romaji: Jūichimen Kannon (Bosatsu))
- Korean: 십일면관음(보살) (RR: Sibilmyeon Gwaneum (Bosal))
- Tibetan: བཅུ་གཅིག་ཞལ; Wylie: bcu gcig zhal THL: Chuchik Zhel
- Vietnamese: Thập Nhất Diện Quan Âm (Bồ Tát)

Information
- Venerated by: Mahāyāna, Vajrayāna

In Buddhism, Ekādaśamukha (Sanskrit: एकादशमुख, IPA: [eːˈkɑːd̪ɐɕɐmukʰɐ], lit. "Eleven-Faced"; Chinese (Traditional): 十一面觀音; Simplified: 十一面观音; pinyin: Shíyīmiàn Guānyīn; Japanese: 十一面観音, Jūichimen Kannon) is a bodhisattva and a manifestation of Avalokiteśvara (known in Chinese as Guanyin), counted as one of six forms of the bodhisattva that represent salvation afforded to beings among the six realms of saṃsāra. Among these incarnations, Ekādaśamukha is believed to save those in the asura realm.

Ekādaśamukha is sometimes also referred to as Avalokiteśvara of the Universally Shining Great Light (大光普照觀世音; Ch. Dàguāng Pǔzhào Guānshìyīn; Jp. Daikō Fushō Kanzeon).

== Overview ==
=== Historical origins ===
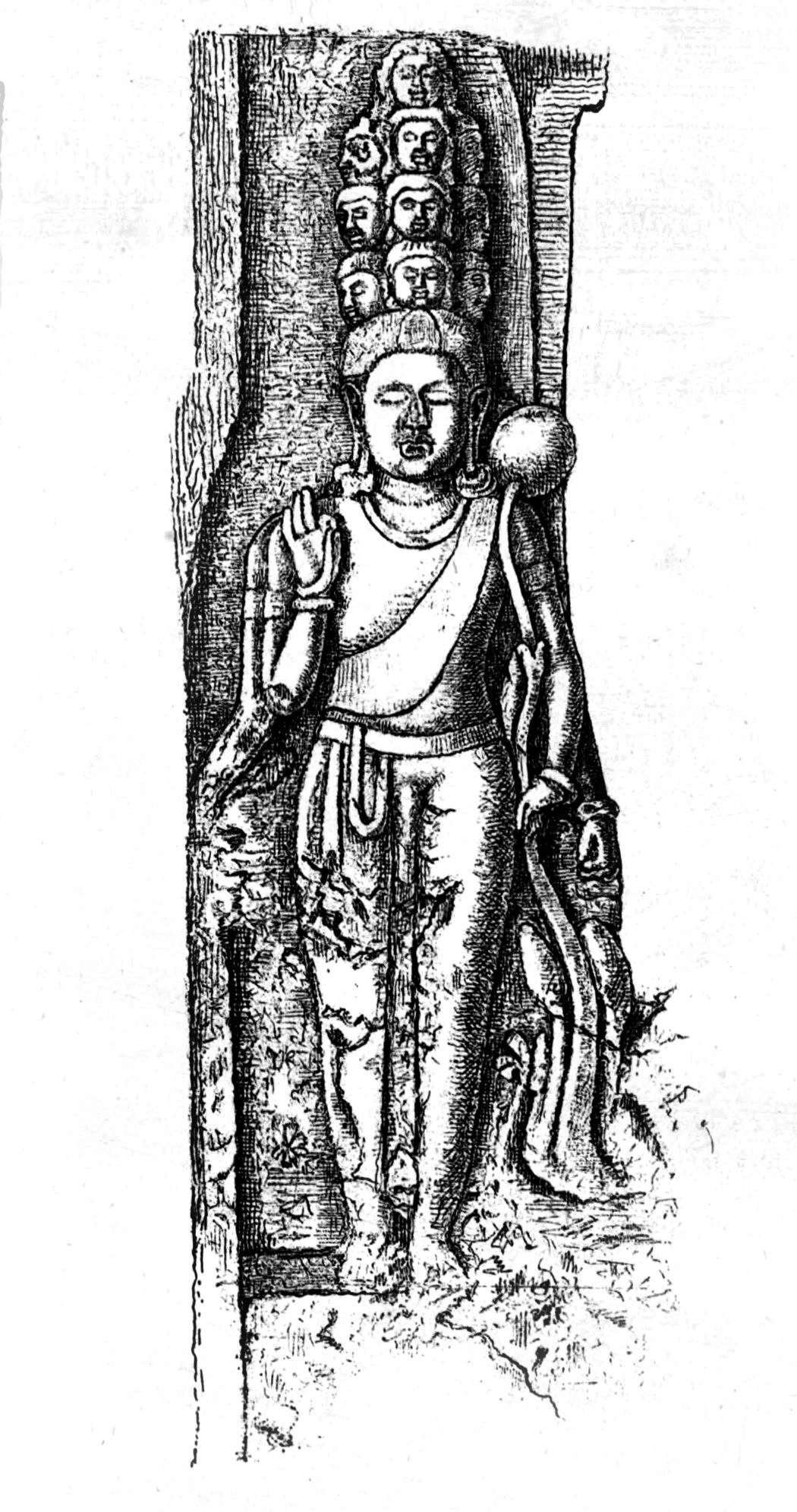
Drawing of relief of Ekādaśamukha in Kanheri Cave 41, Mumbai, Maharashtra.

Although usually classified as an Esoteric or Tantric form of the bodhisattva, the eleven-headed (ekādaśamukha) type is thought to be one of the earliest iconographic depictions of Avalokiteśvara to develop, predating the emergence of Vajrayāna Buddhism. Its exact origin is unclear, though certain authors such as Lokesh Chandra have associated it with the eleven Rudras of Vedic and Hindu mythology. It is known that certain aspects of the Hindu god Shiva (Rudra) and elements of Shaivism both influenced and were incorporated into Buddhism, playing a role in the development of Avalokiteśvara's cult.

A relief carving of the eleven-headed Avalokiteśvara in Kanheri (Cave 41), dating from the late 5th to early 6th century, is both the earliest extant example of this iconographic type and the only surviving Ekādaśamukha image in India. Artistic depictions of this form are more numerous in East Asia: it is apparently one of the more popular forms of Avalokiteśvara in Dunhuang, second only to his thousand-armed or Sahasrabhuja form (itself a derivative of the Ekādaśamukha type), judging by the number of paintings of the bodhisattva found there. In Japan, Ekādaśamukha also historiclally enjoyed a high degree of popularity, with images of the bodhisattva being installed as the main focus of veneration (honzon) in many temples.

=== Symbolism ===
One interpretation of the eleven faces of Ekādaśamukha is that it represents both the ten stages (bhūmis) of the bodhisattva path and buddhahood itself. Another interpretation meanwhile interprets the eleven heads as symbolizing the eleven kinds of ignorance (avidyā) that plague sentient beings and which the bodhisattva removes.

Certain depictions where Ekādaśamukha is shown with a total of twelve heads rather than eleven (i.e. his main head is not counted among the eleven heads) are meanwhile taken to symbolize the twelve links (nidānas) of dependent origination.

=== Stories regarding Ekādaśamukha ===
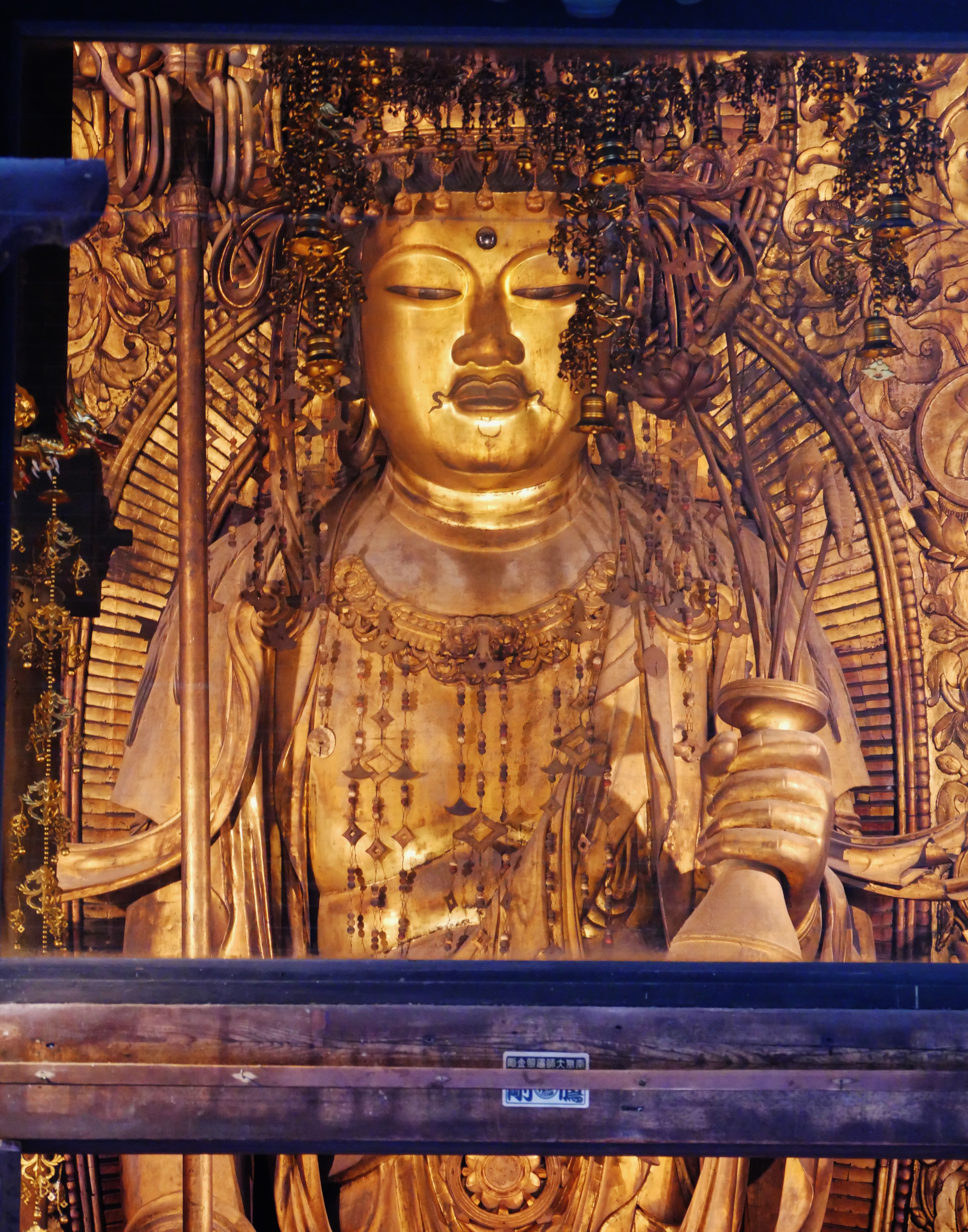
Muromachi period (1336 - 1573) statue of Jūichimen Kannon located at the hondō of Hasadera in Sakurai, Nara, Japan. Carved in 1538.

Buddhist lore offers various explanations as to how Avalokiteśvara obtained eleven heads. One story relates that Avalokiteśvara's head and arms once split into pieces when he discovered the extent of wickedness and suffering in the world and was overcome with grief as a result. The buddha Amitābha, seeing Avalokiteśvara's plight, restored him by giving him eleven heads and a thousand arms with which to aid sentient beings. In another story, Avalokiteśvara is said to have assumed this eleven-headed form to subdue and convert a prideful ten-headed rakshasa demon.

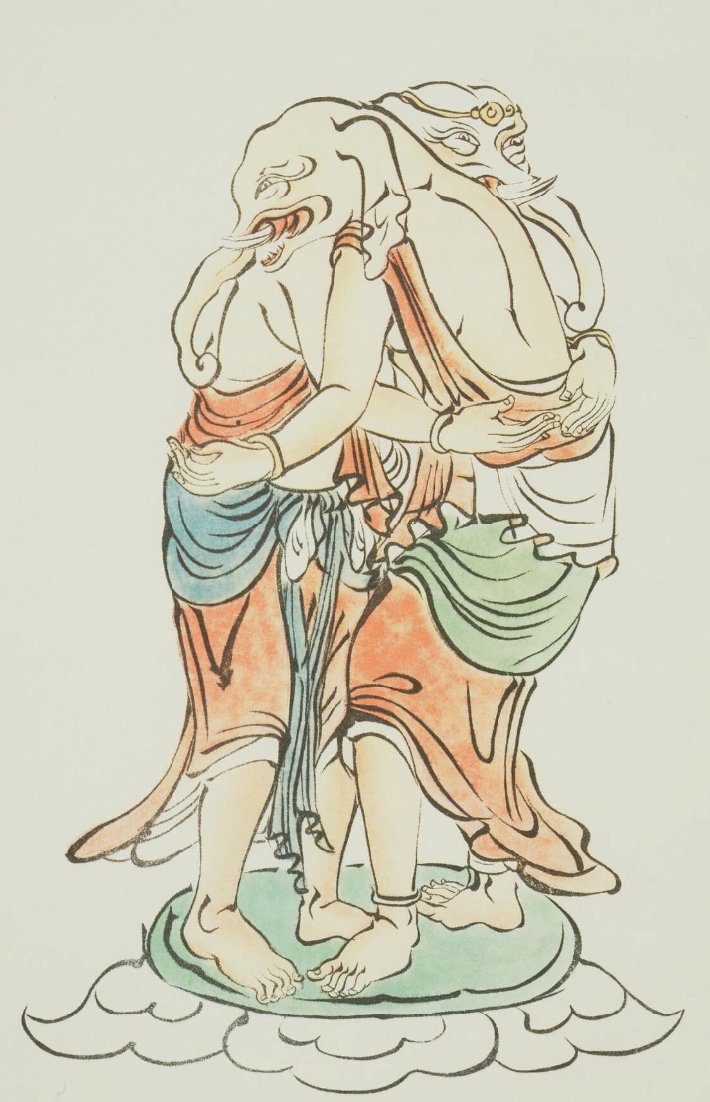
Vināyaka (Kangiten in Japanese).

Ekādaśamukha is closely associated with the elephant-headed deva Vināyaka, the Buddhist analogue to the Hindu deity Ganesha. Certain stories relate that Vināyaka was originally a malevolent demon king who ruled over a horde of obstructive demons called vināyakas. He was eventually tamed by Avalokiteśvara, who assumed the form of an elephant-headed female demoness and embraced him, thereby causing him to achieve great bliss and abandon his evil ways. These legends serve as the origin myth for the 'Dual-Bodied' image of Vināyaka, which shows two elephant-headed figures (interpreted as Vināyaka and his consort, the incarnation of the eleven-headed Avalokiteśvara) embracing each other.

== Iconography ==
As noted above, Ekādaśamukha may be depicted with either eleven or twelve (i.e. the main head is not counted) heads.

Of the eleven faces, three wear a benevolent, serene expression characteristic of depictions of bodhisattvas, three sport a wrathful countenance, three are grinning with fangs protruding upward from their mouths, one is laughing boisterously, whilst the final, topmost head is that of a buddha, sporting a calm demeanor and a head knob (uṣṇīṣa).

== Bīja and mantra ==
The bījā or seed syllable used to symbolically represent Ekādaśamukha is ka (Siddhaṃ:; Devanagari: क; traditionally read in Japanese as kya).

Several mantras and dhāraṇīs are associated with the bodhisattva. The two mantras commonly employed in the Japanese tradition are the following:

Sanskrit (romanized)	Japanese (romanized)
Oṃ mahakāruṇika svāhā	On makakyaronikya sowaka
Oṃ lokeśvara hrīḥ (svāhā)	On rokeiji(n)bara kiriku (sowaka)

== Gallery ==
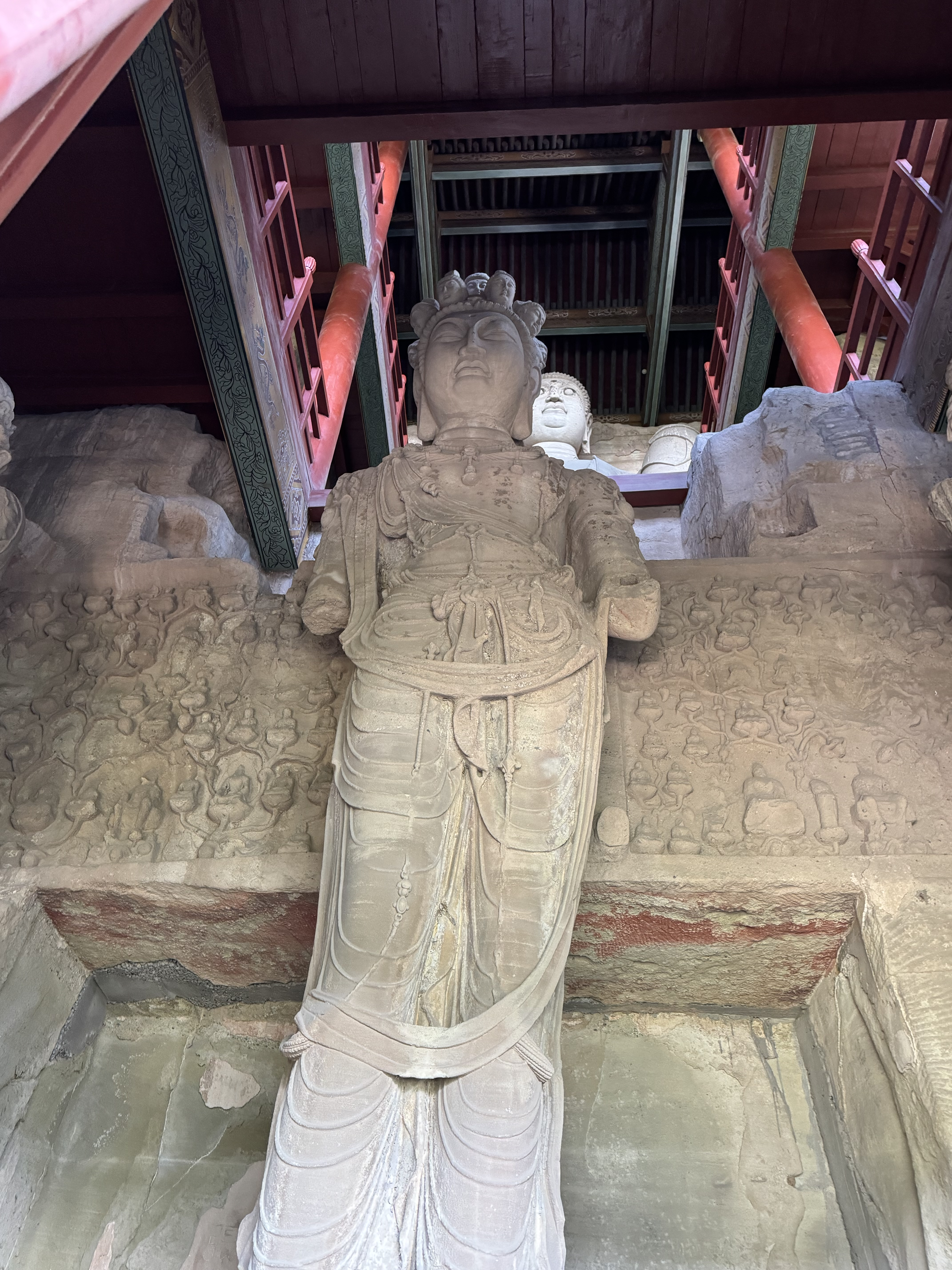
Chinese statue of Shiyimian Guanyin, flanked by Wenshu and Puxian at Tianlongshan Grottoes in Shanxi, China.

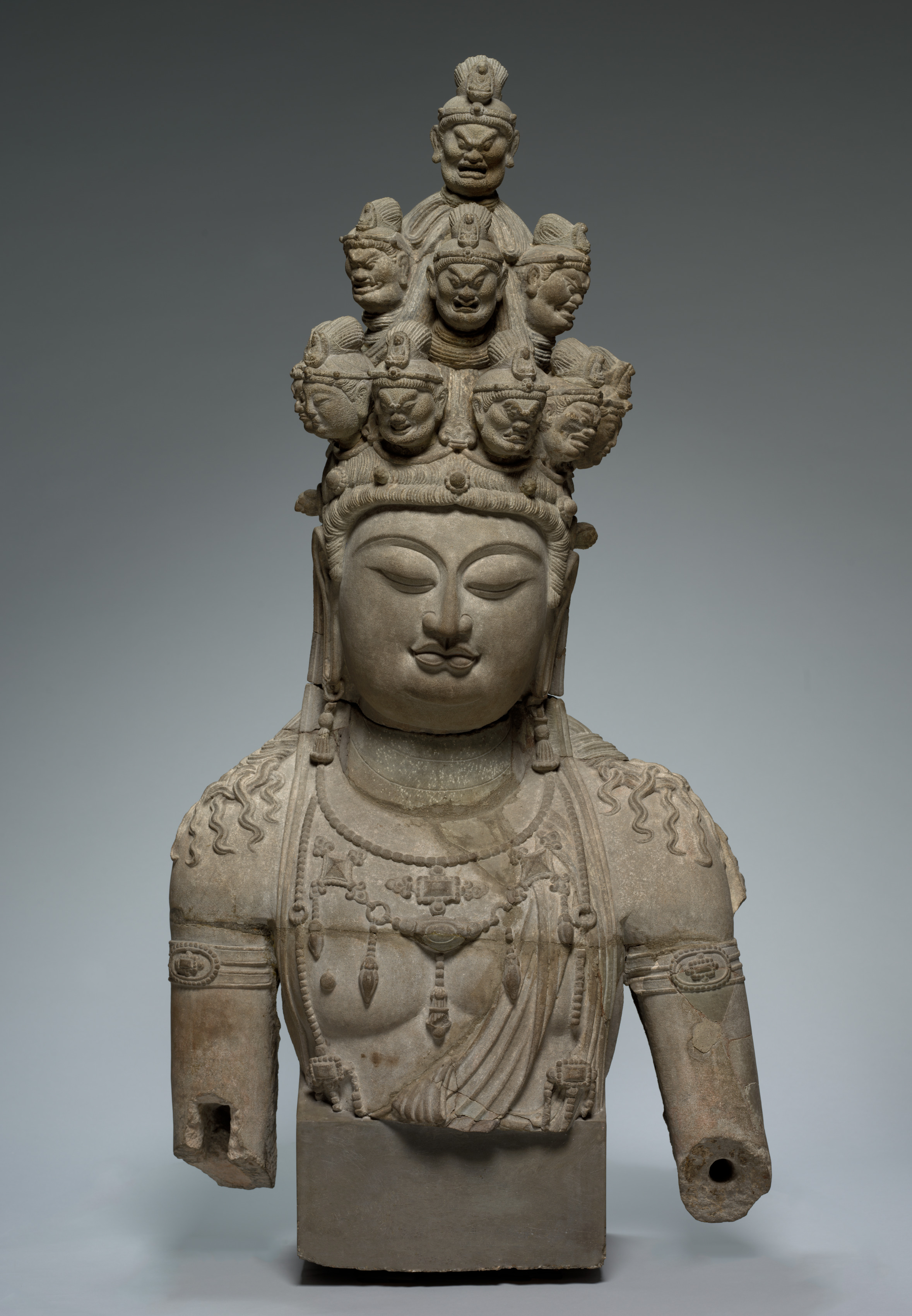
Tang dynasty (618-907) Chinese sandstone bust of Shiyimian Guanyin. Held at the Cleveland Museum of Art in Ohio, USA.

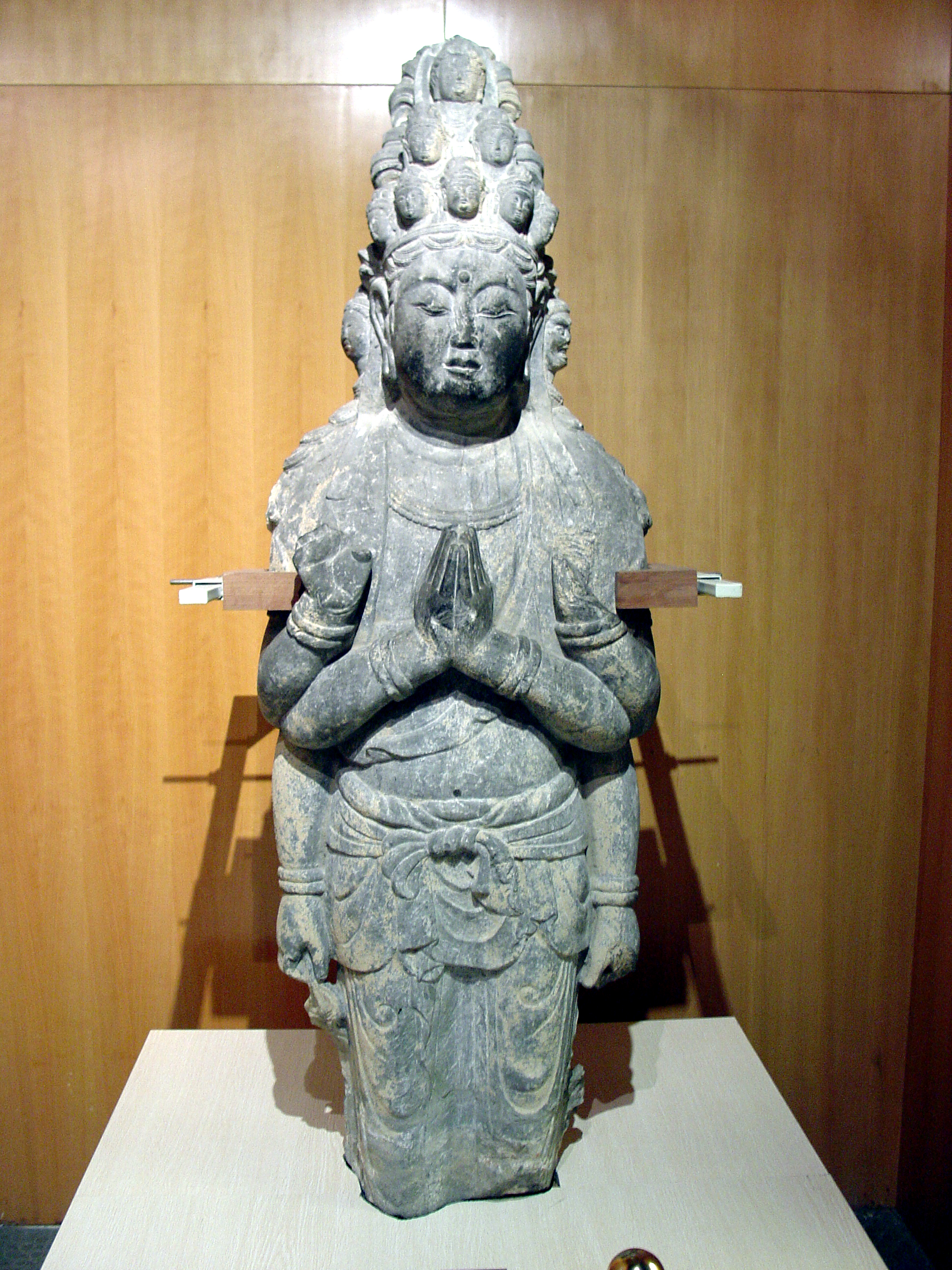
Tang dynasty (618-907) Chinese statue of Shiyimian Guanyin. Held at the Henan Provincial Museum in Zhengzhou, Henan, China.

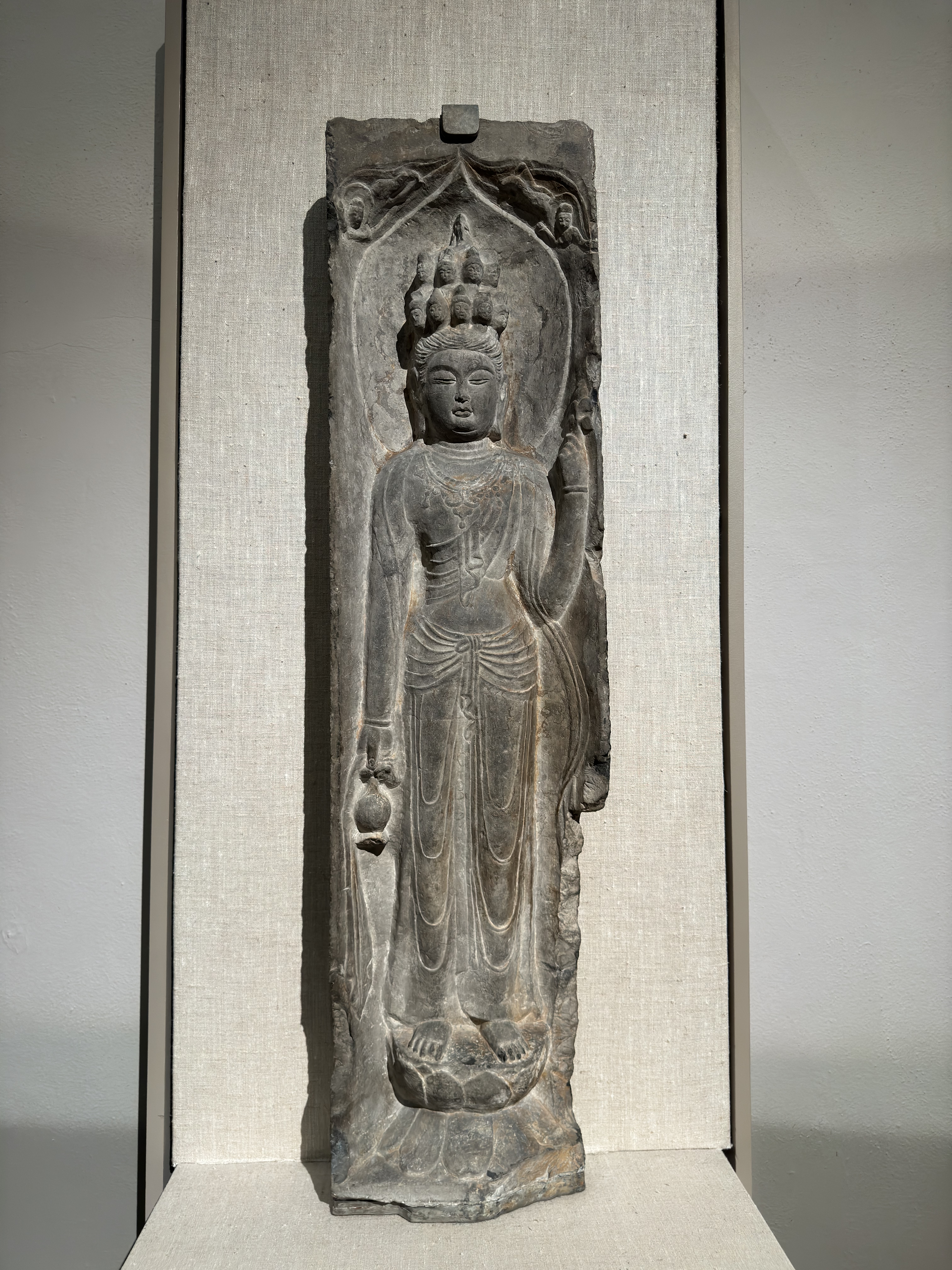
Tang dynasty (618-907) Chinese stone statue of Shiyimian Guanyin from Baoqing Temple in Xi'an, Shaanxi, China. Held at the Museum of Fine Arts, Boston, in Massachusetts, USA.

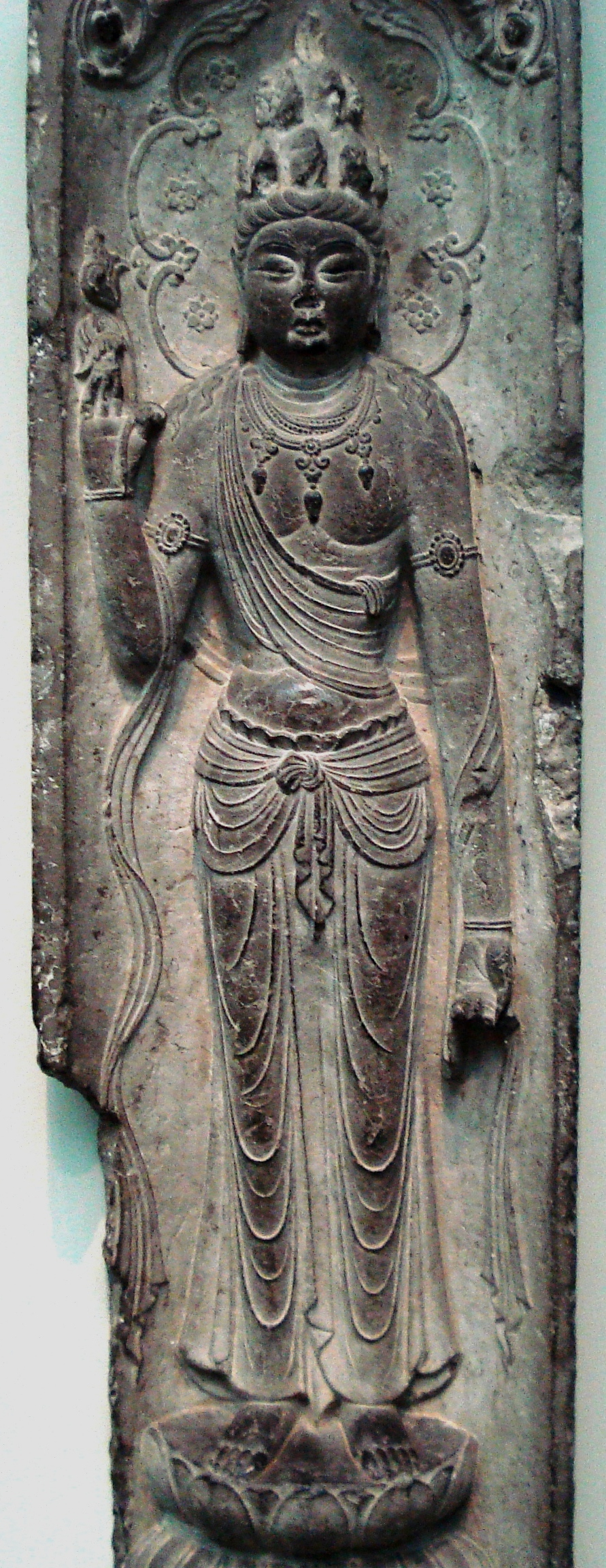
Tang dynasty (618-907) Chinese limestone-carved relief of Shiyimian Guanyin from Xi'an, Shaanxi, China. Held at the Freer Gallery of Art in Washington, USA.

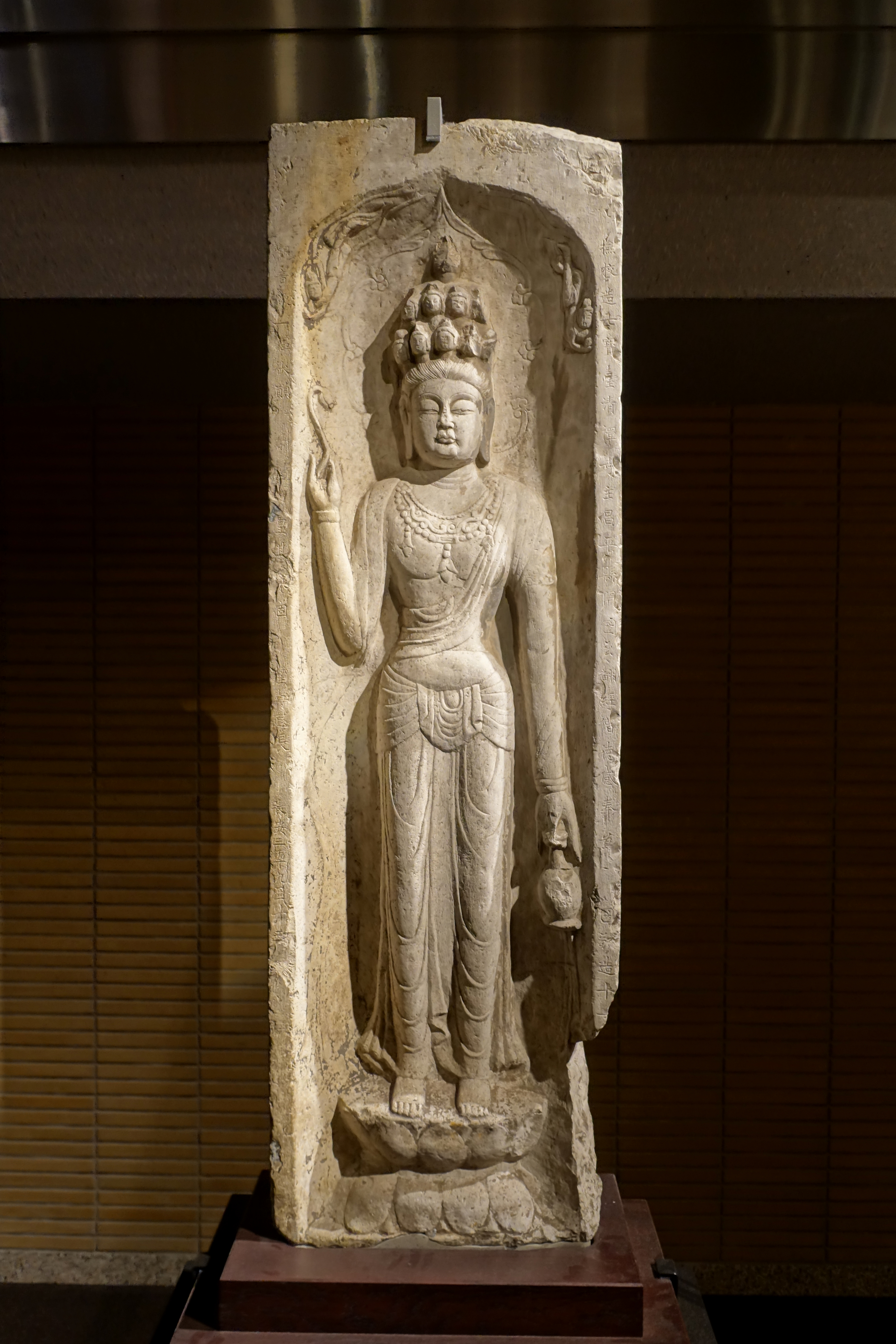
Tang dynasty (618-907) Chinese limestone-carved relief of Shiyimian Guanyin from Baoqing Temple in Xi'an, Shaanxi, China. Dated to 703. Held at the Tokyo National Museum in Tokyo, Japan.

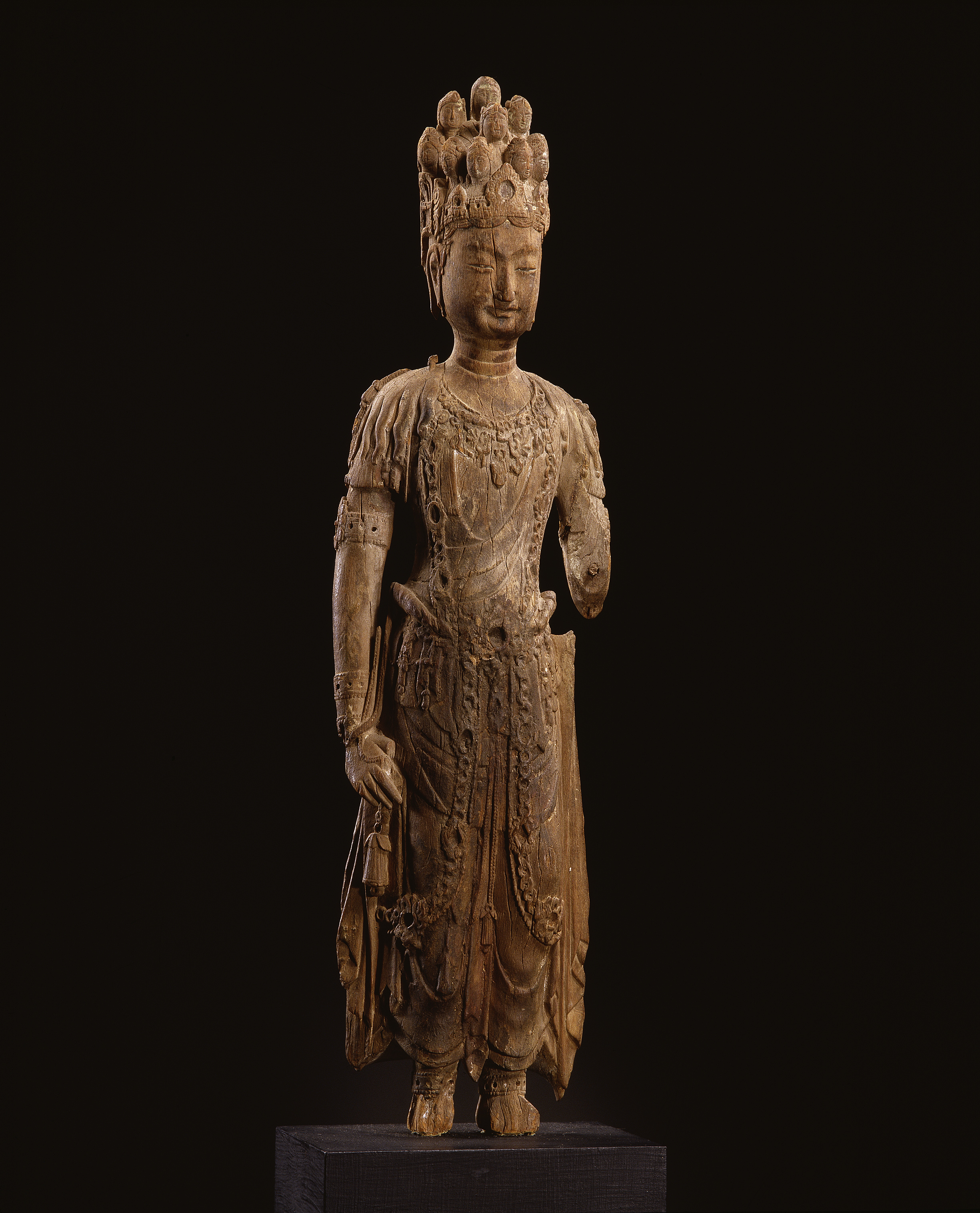
Tang dynasty (618-907) Chinese statue of Shiyimian Guanyin. Held at the Staatliche Museen zu Berlin, Berlin, Germany.

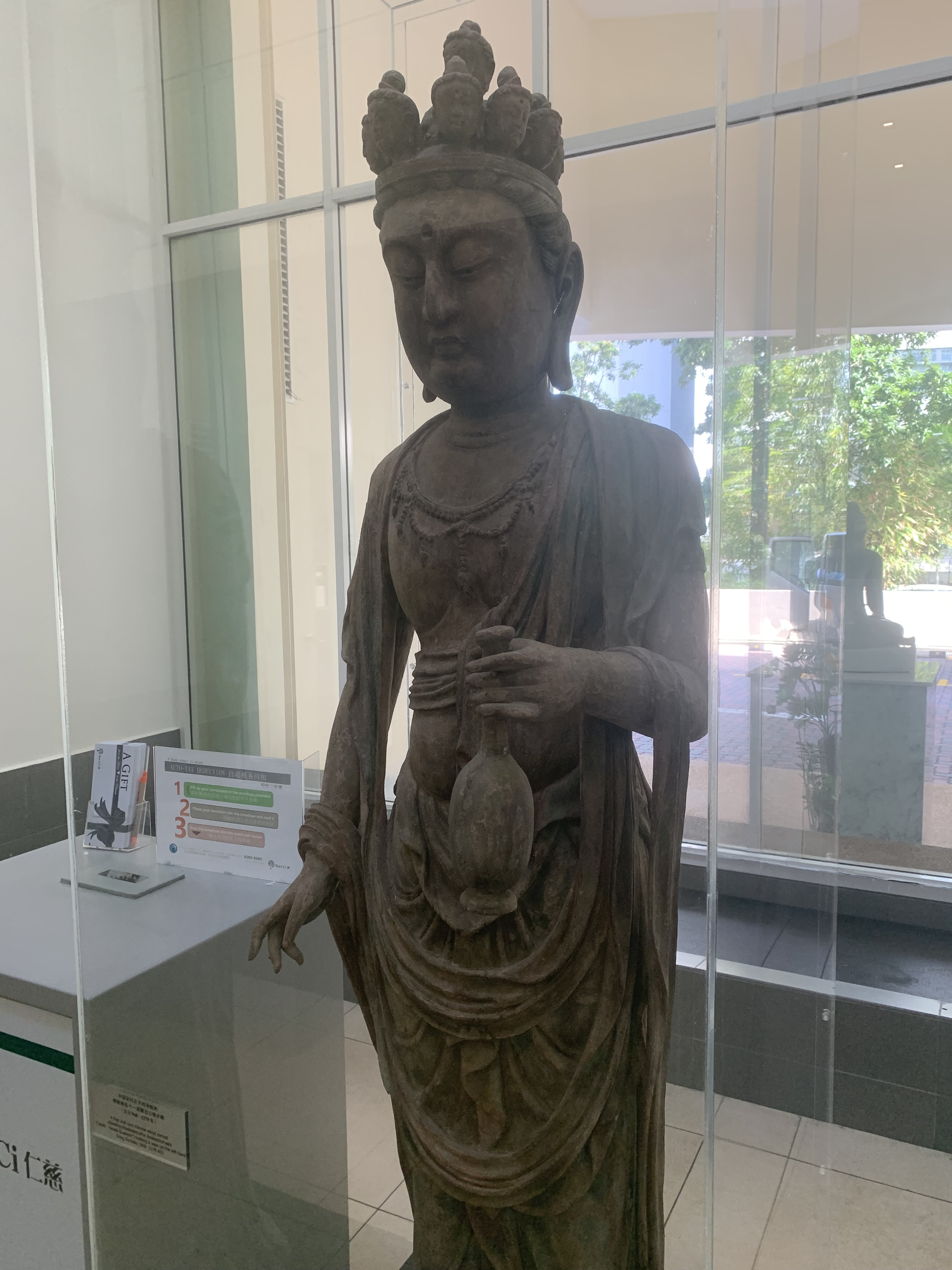
Song dynasty (960 - 1279) statue of Shiyimian Guanyin at Ren Ci Hospital in Singapore.

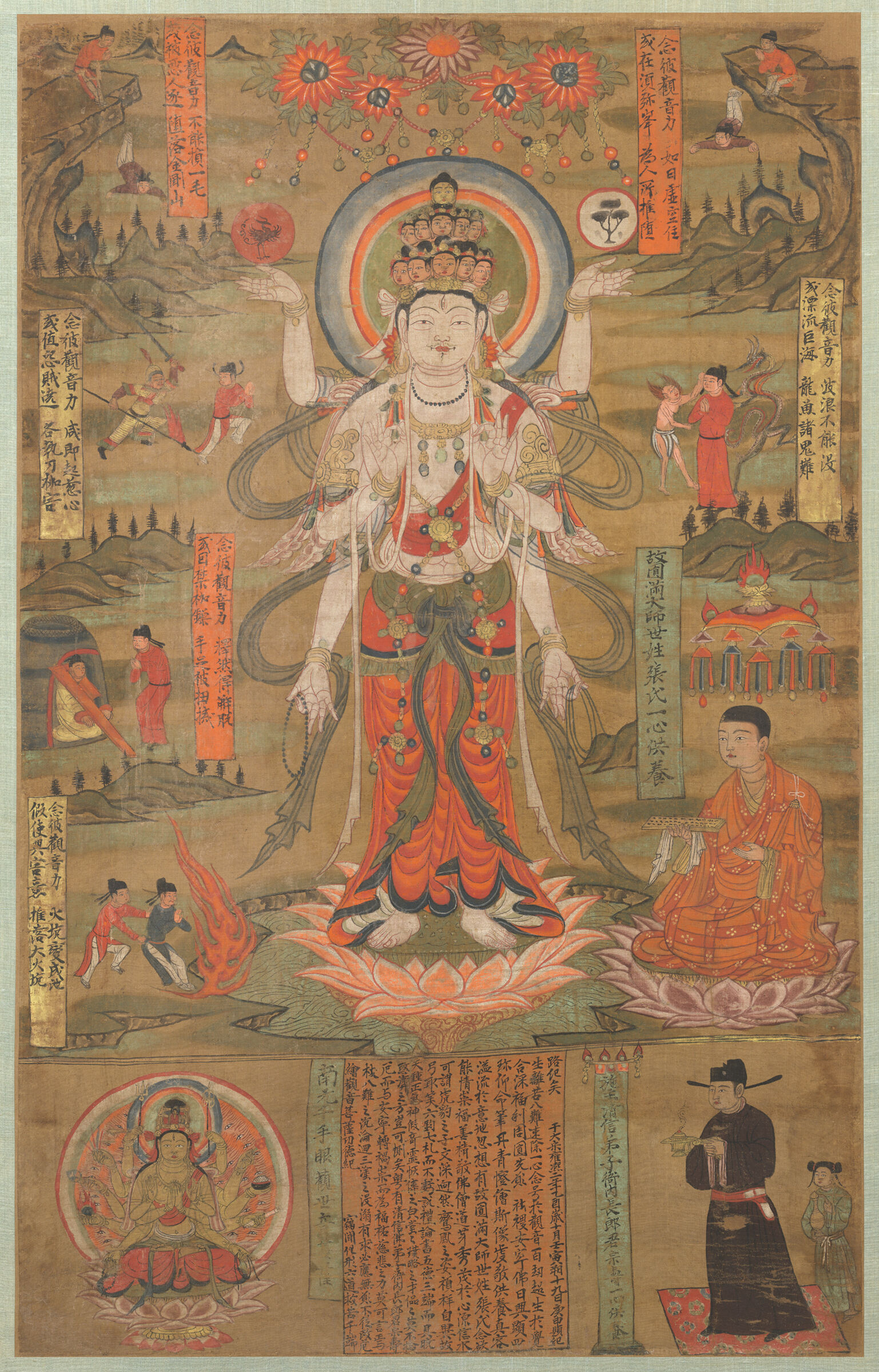
Song dynasty (960 - 1279) painting of Shiyimian Guanyin, or the Eleven Headed Guanyin, from Dunhuang in Gansu, China. Held at the Harvard Art Museum in Massachusetts, USA.

Song dynasty (960-1279) Chinese statue of Shiyimian Guanyin. Held at the Cleveland Museum of Art in Ohio, USA.

Tang dynasty (618-907) Chinese statue of Shiyimian Guanyin. Held at the Cleveland Museum of Art in Ohio, USA.

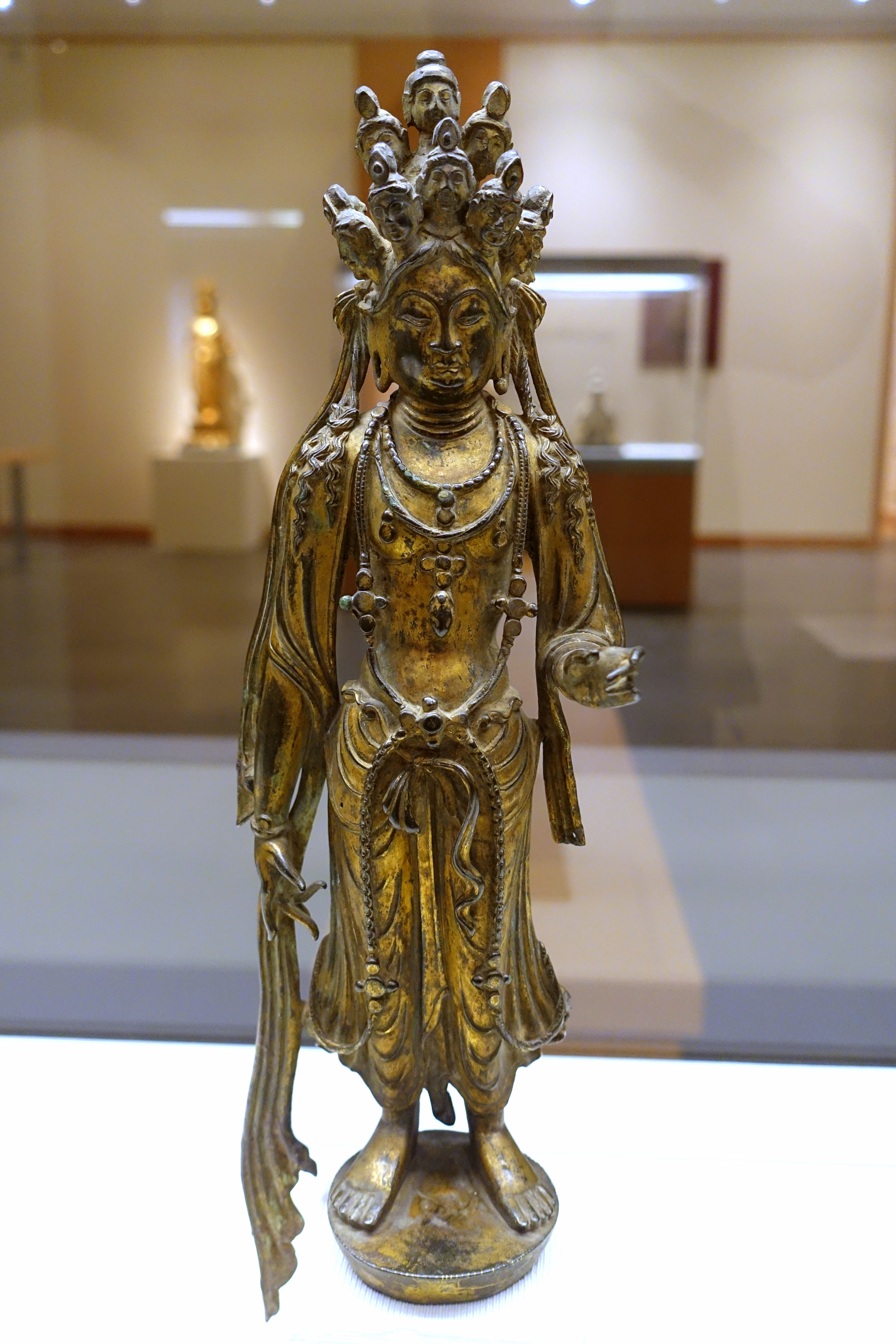
Tang dynasty (618-907) Chinese statue of Shiyimian Guanyin. Held at the Ethnological Museum of Berlin, Berlin, Germany.

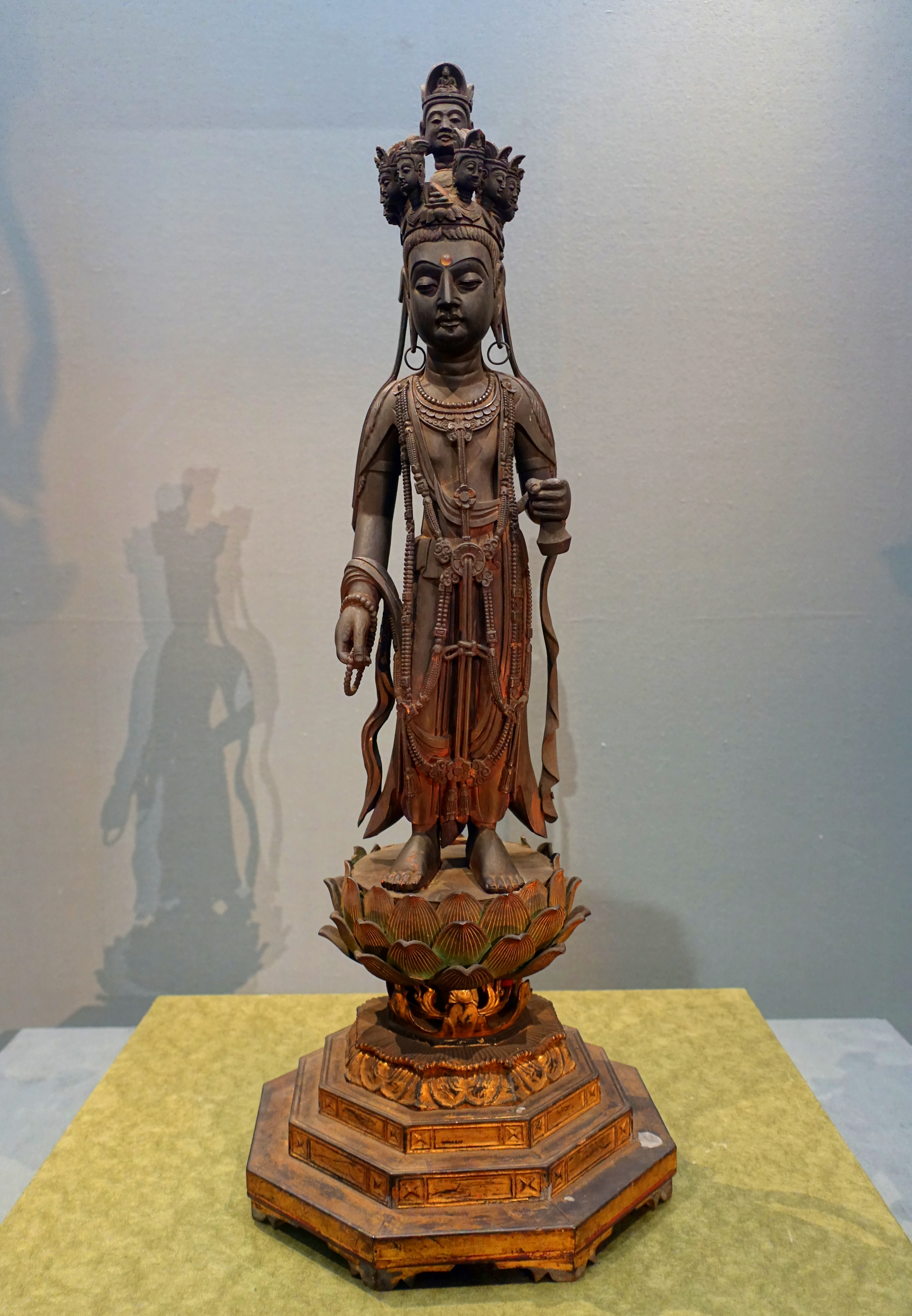
Tang dynasty (618-907) statue of Shiyimian Guanyin from Mount Tonomine in Sakurai, Nara, Japan. Held at the Tokyo National Museum in Tokyo, Japan.

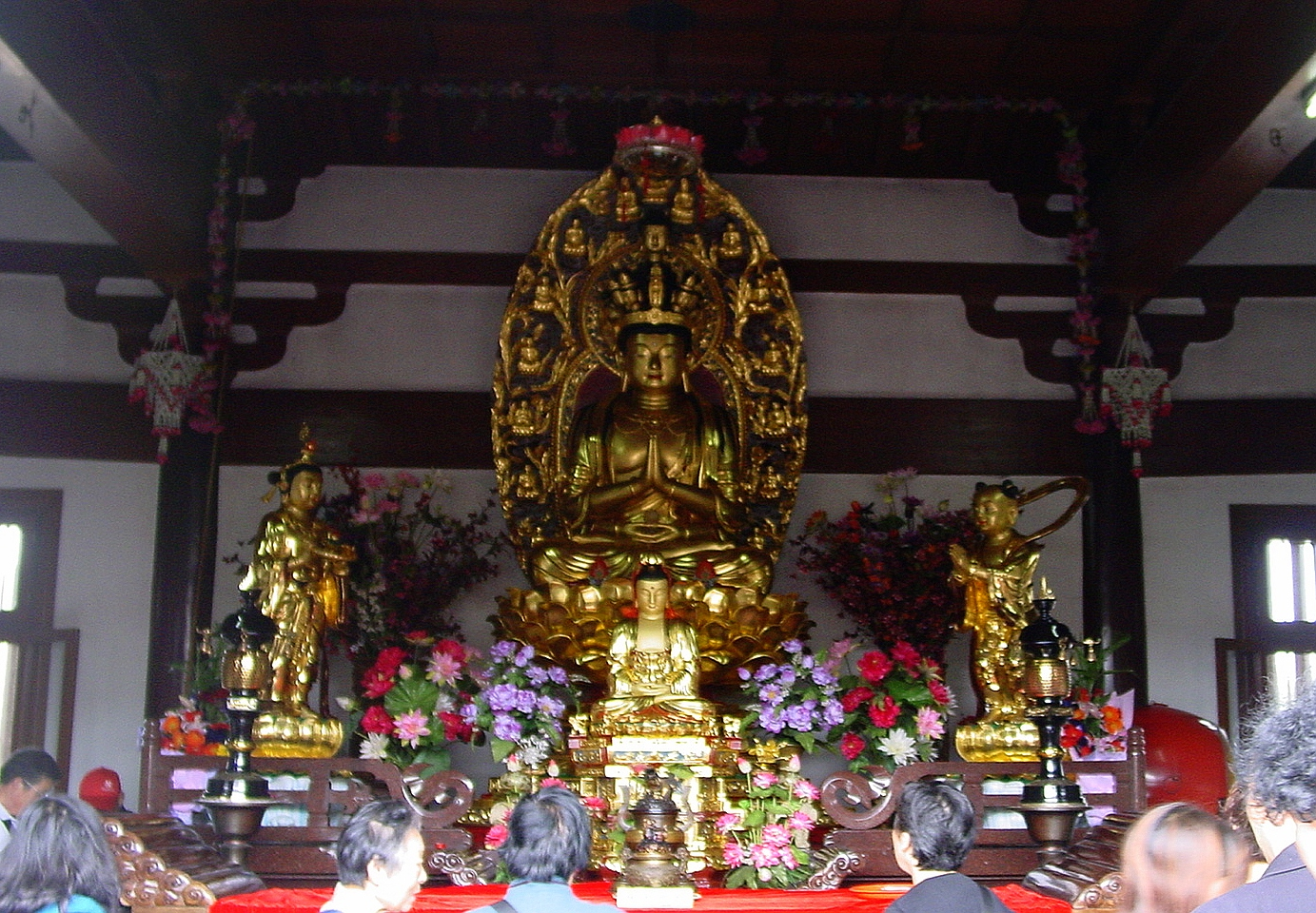
Statue of Shiyimian Guanyin in Bukenqu Guanyin Temple in Putuoshan, Zhejiang, China.

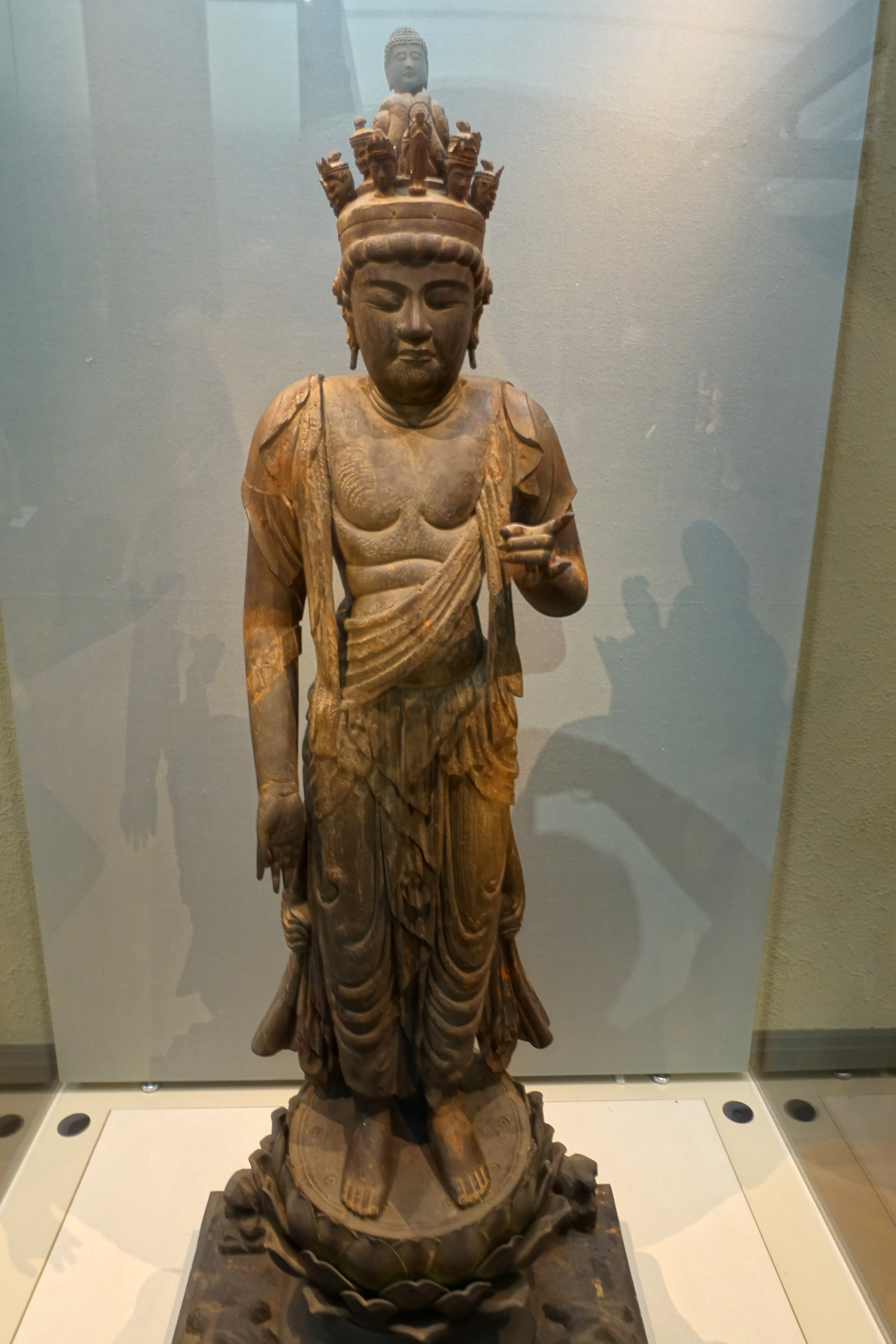
9th century Japanese statue of Jūichimen Kannon. Held at the Tokyo National Museum in Tokyo, Japan.

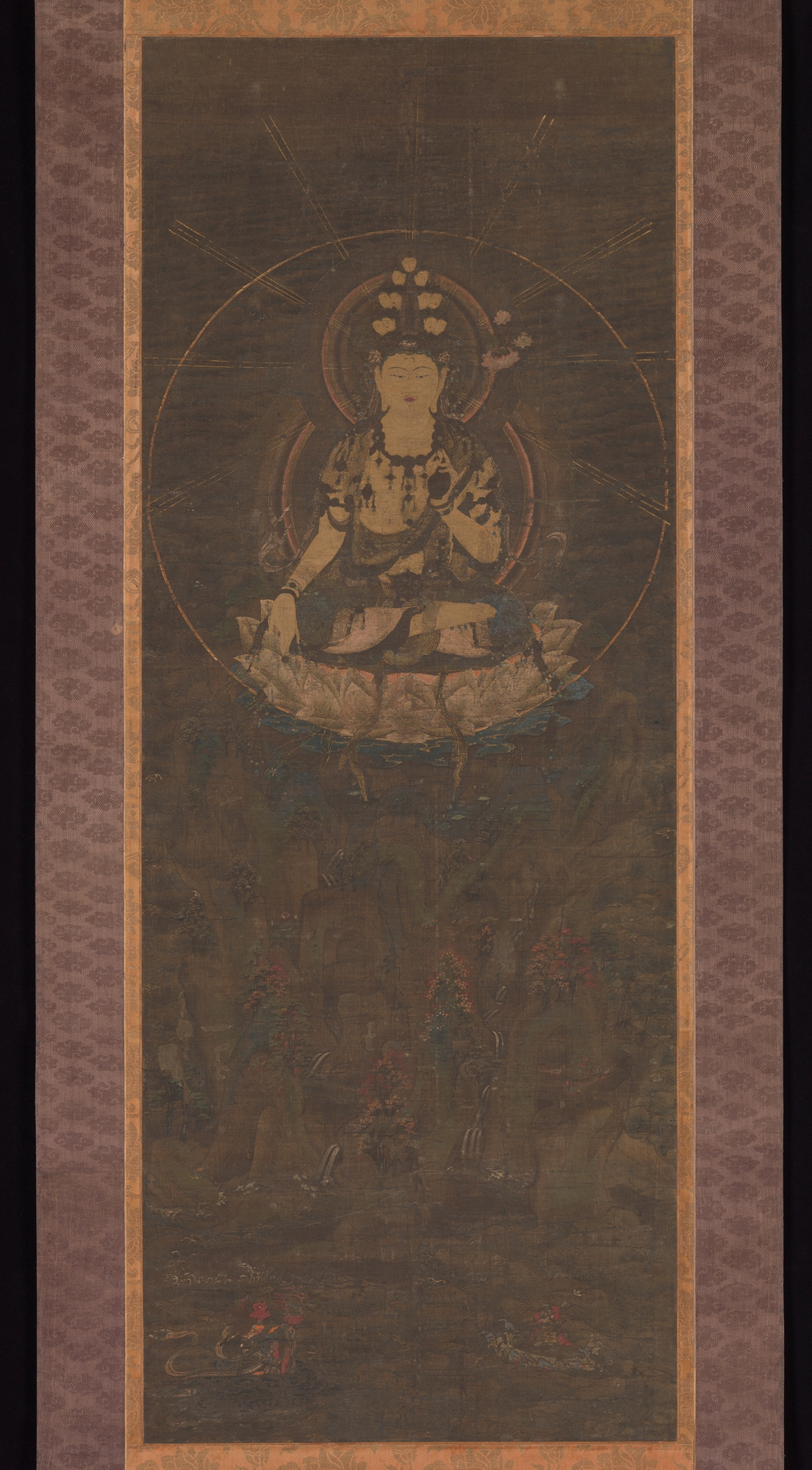
13th century Japanese painting of Jūichimen Kannon on Mount Fudaraka. Held at the Metropolitan Museum of Art in New York City, USA.

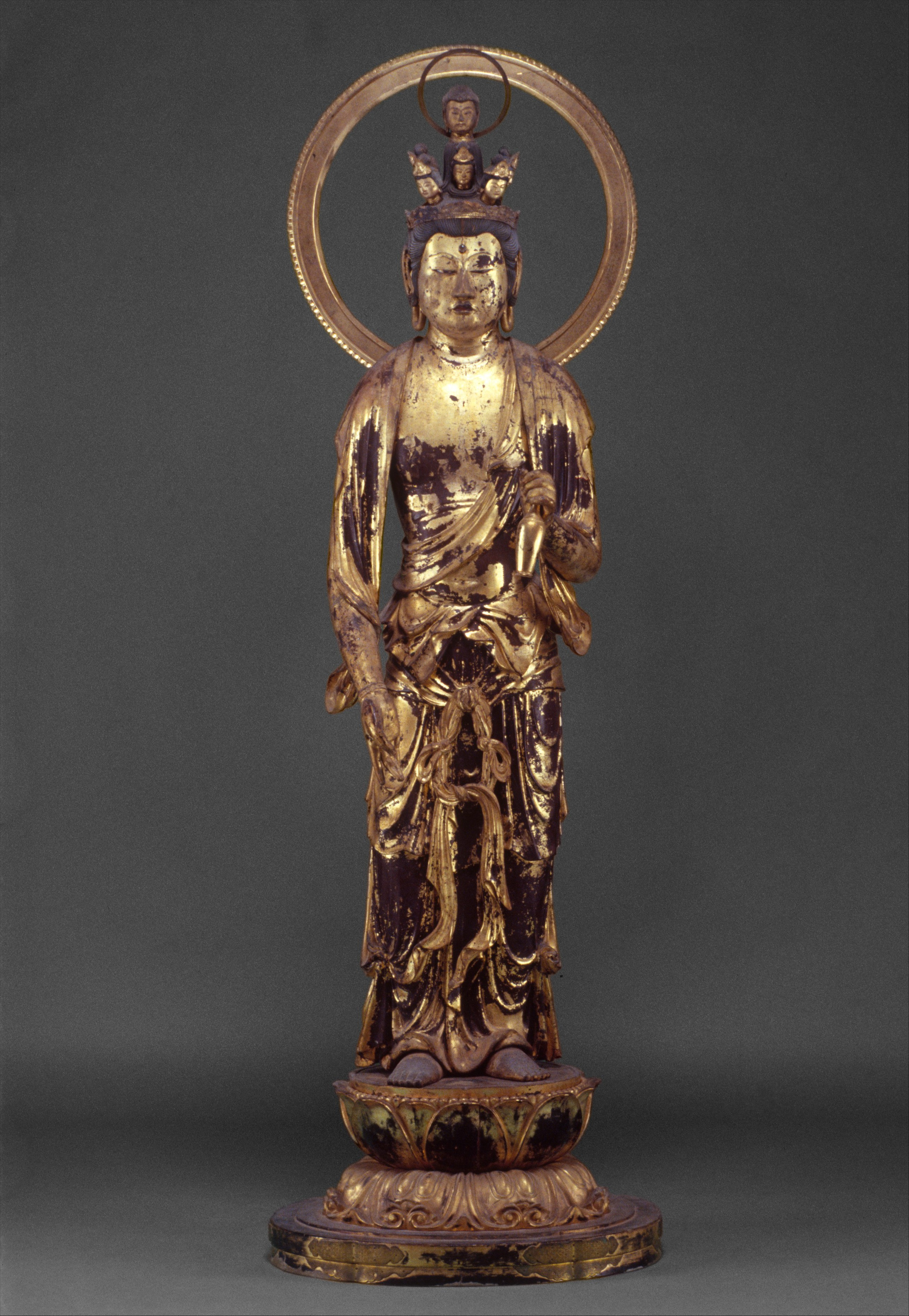
Nanbokuchō period (1336-1392) Japanese statue of Jūichimen Kannon. Held at the Metropolitan Museum of Art in New York City, USA.

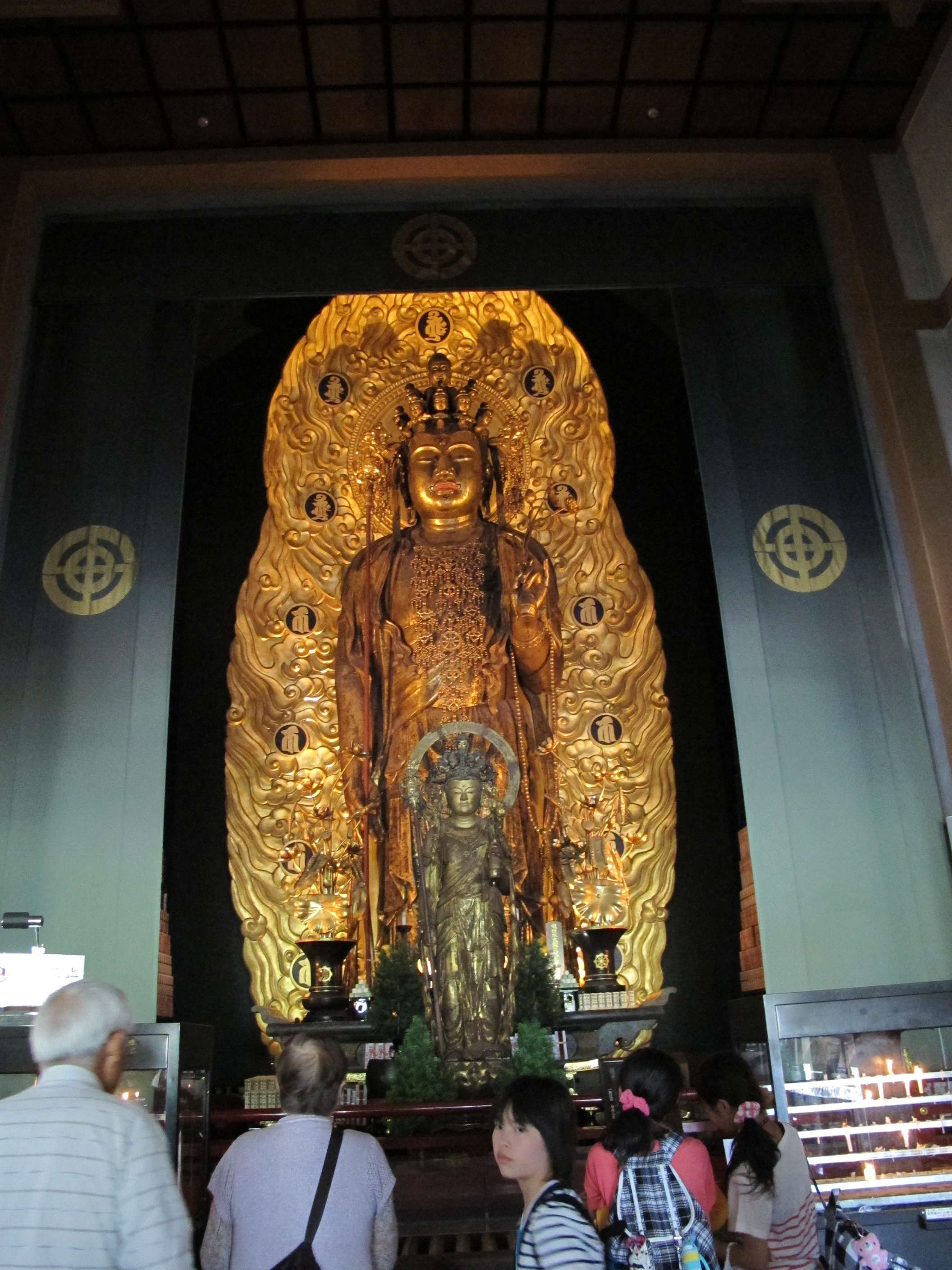
Possible Muromachi period (1336-1573) Japanese statue of Jūichimen Kannon at Hasadera in Kamakura, Kanagawa, Japan.

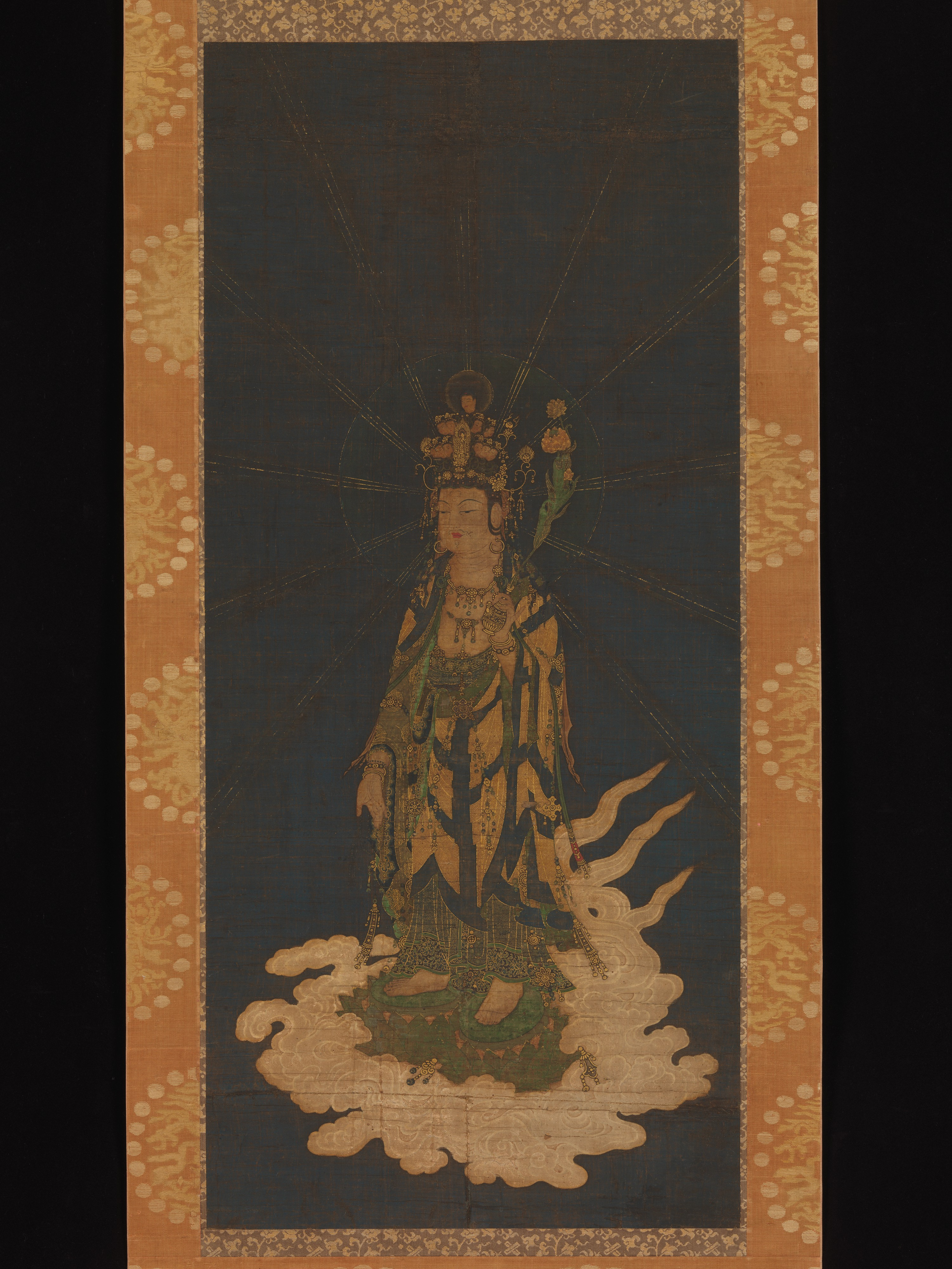
14th century Japanese painting of the raigō of Jūichimen Kannon. Held at the Metropolitan Museum of Art in New York City, USA.

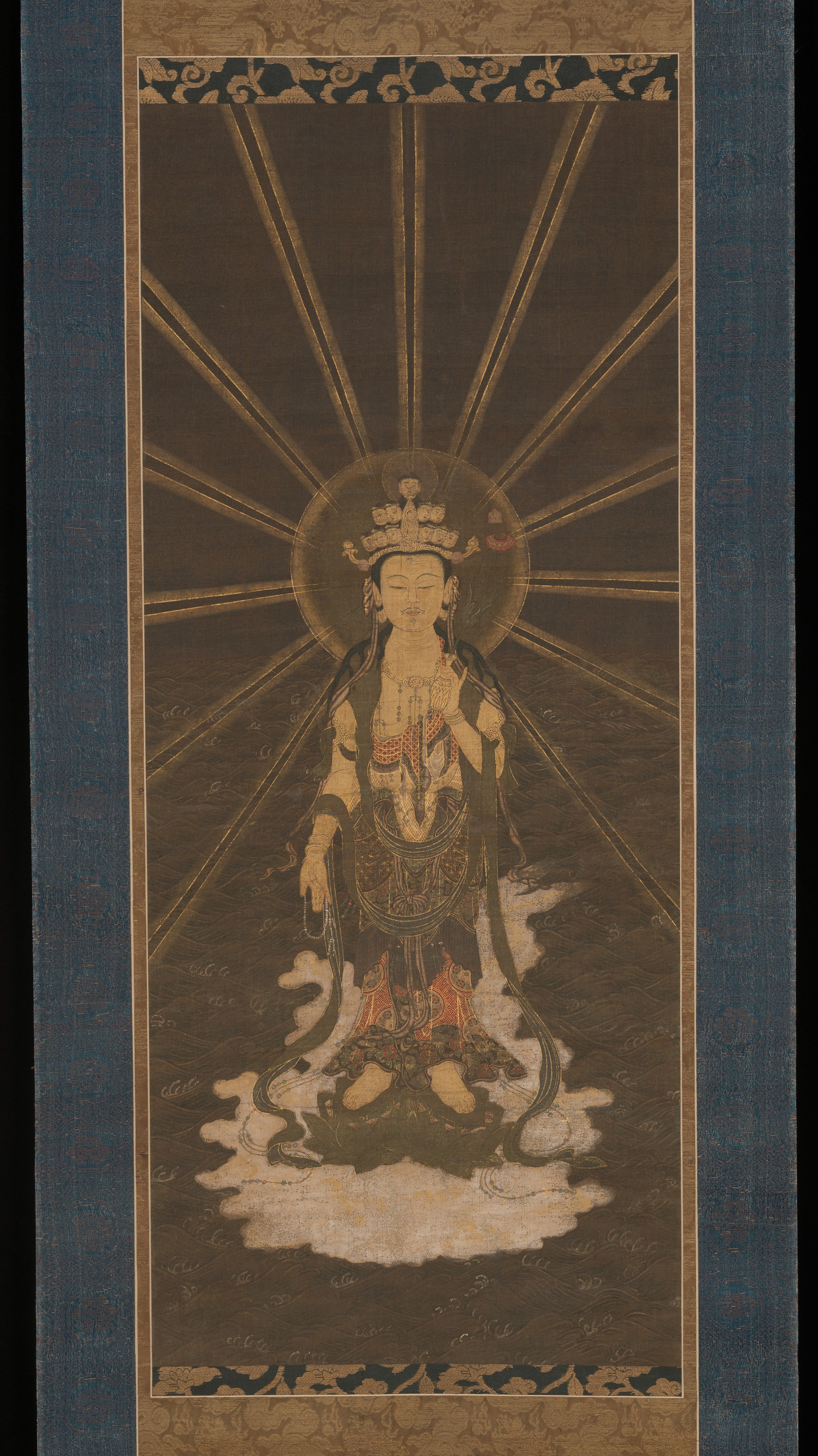
16th century Japanese painting of the raigō of Jūichimen Kannon. Held at the Metropolitan Museum of Art in New York City, USA.

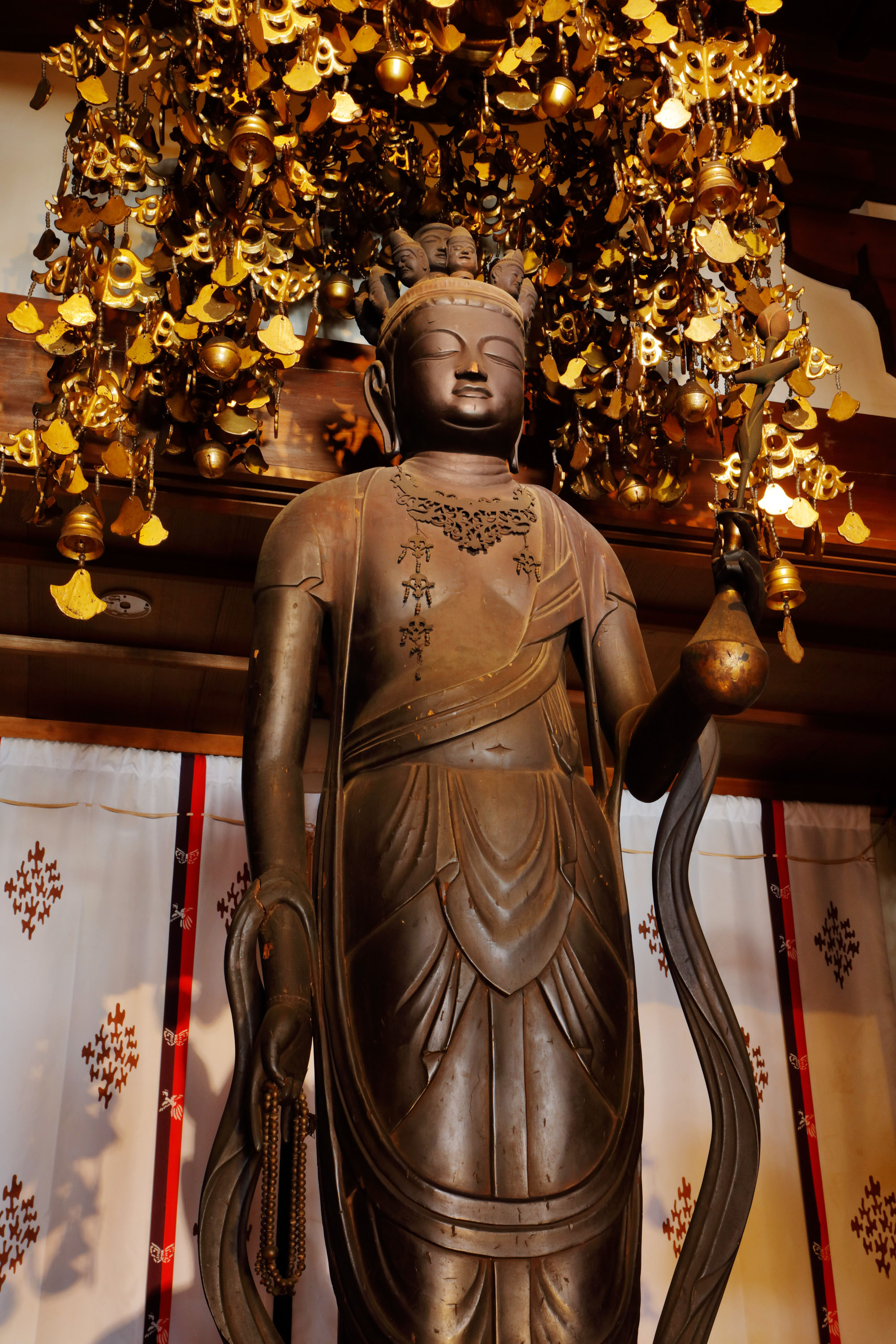
Statue of Jūichimen Kannon at Mie-ji in Gifu, Gifu, Japan.

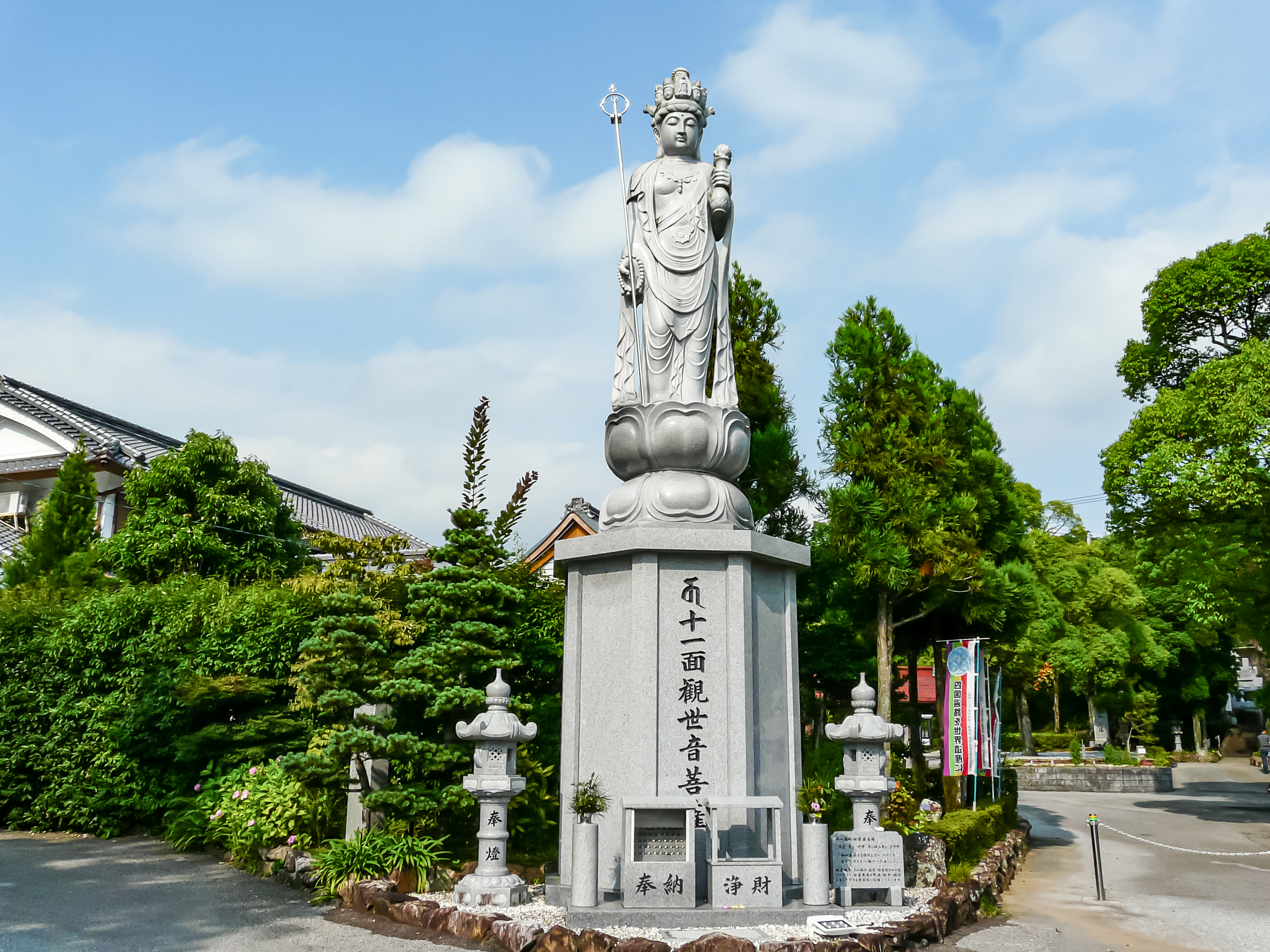
Statue of Jūichimen Kannon at Zenraku-ji in Kōchi, Kōchi, Japan.

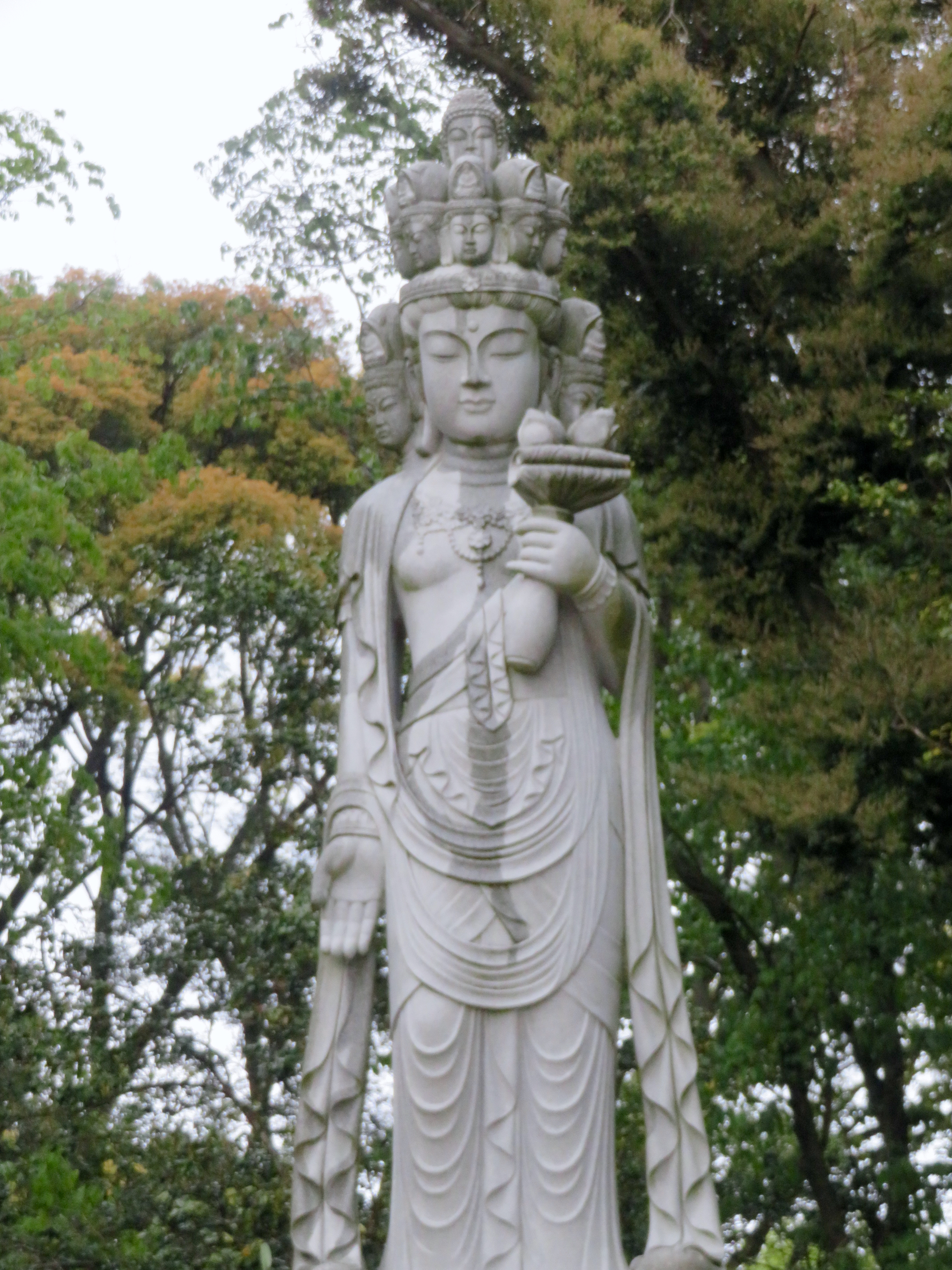
Statue of Jūichimen Kannon at Enpuku-ji in Kasugai, Aichi, Japan.

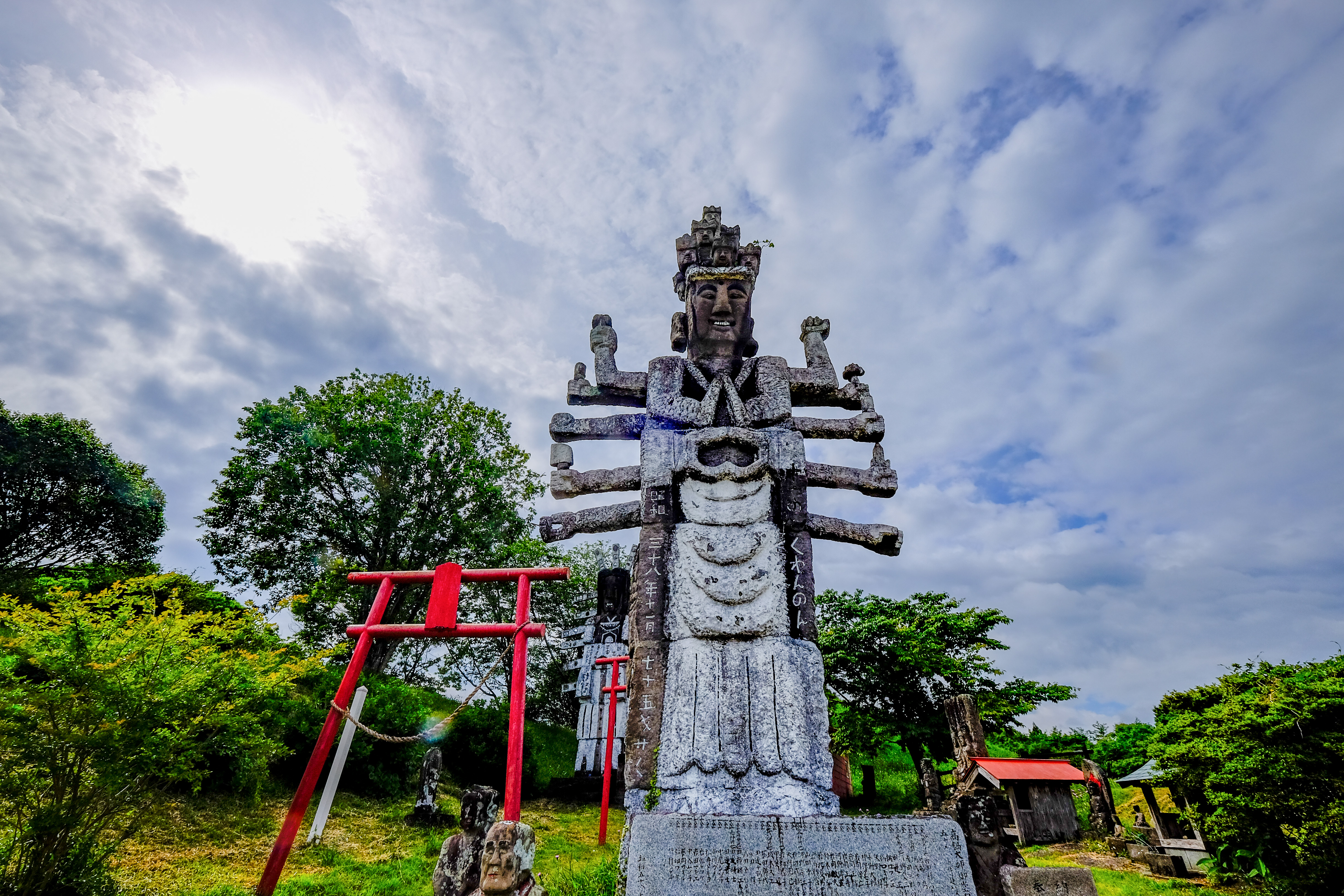
Statue of Jūichimen Kannon at Takanabe Daishi in Koyu, Miyazaki, Japan.

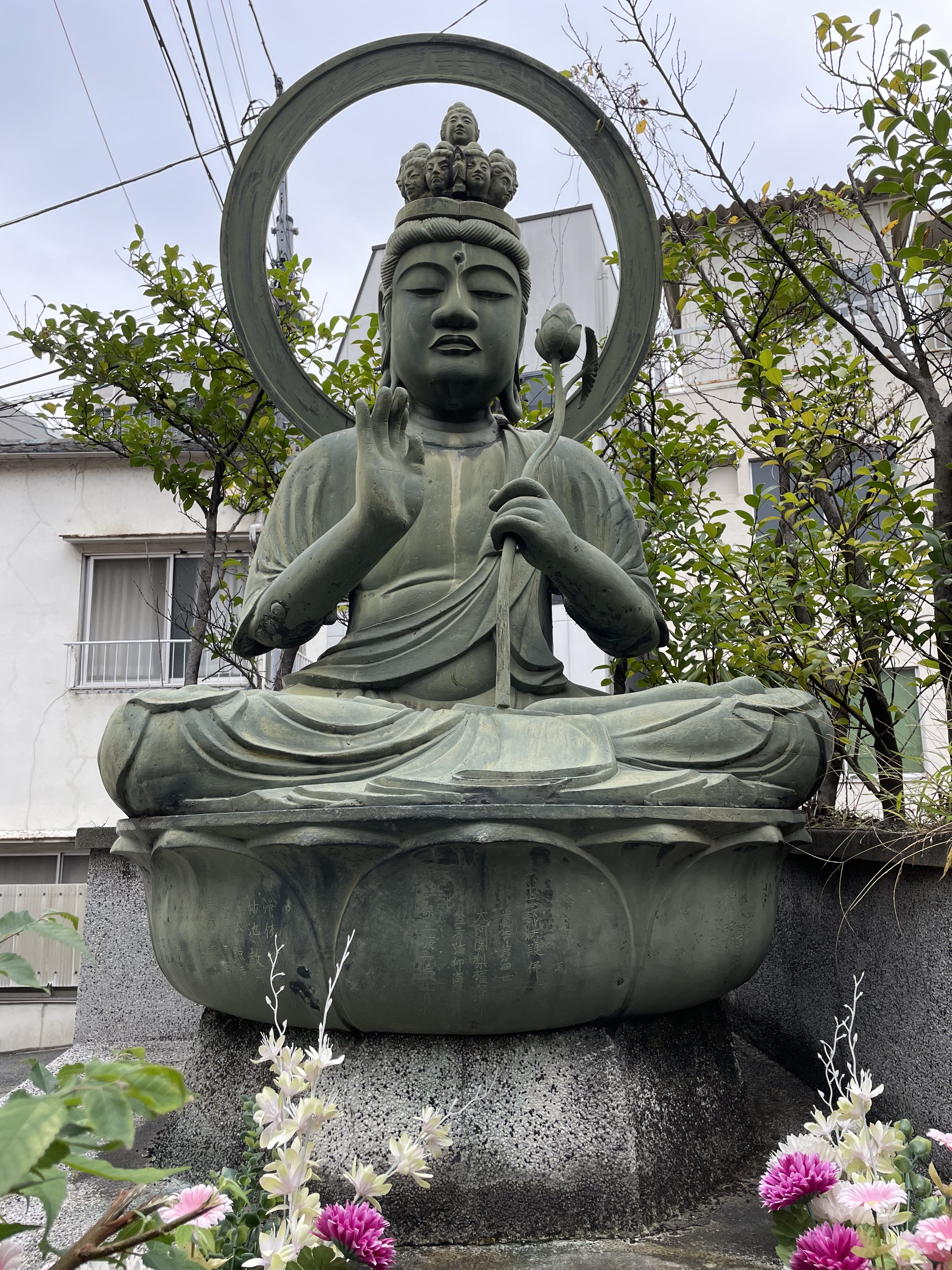
Statue of Jūichimen Kannon at Hongō, Tokyo, Japan.

== See also ==
- Eleven-Faced Avalokitesvara Heart Dharani Sutra
- Hase-dera
- Hase-dera (Kamakura)
- Murō-ji
- Rokuharamitsu-ji
- Shuni-e
- Dule Temple
