= Hayagriva (Buddhism) =

Buddhist deity

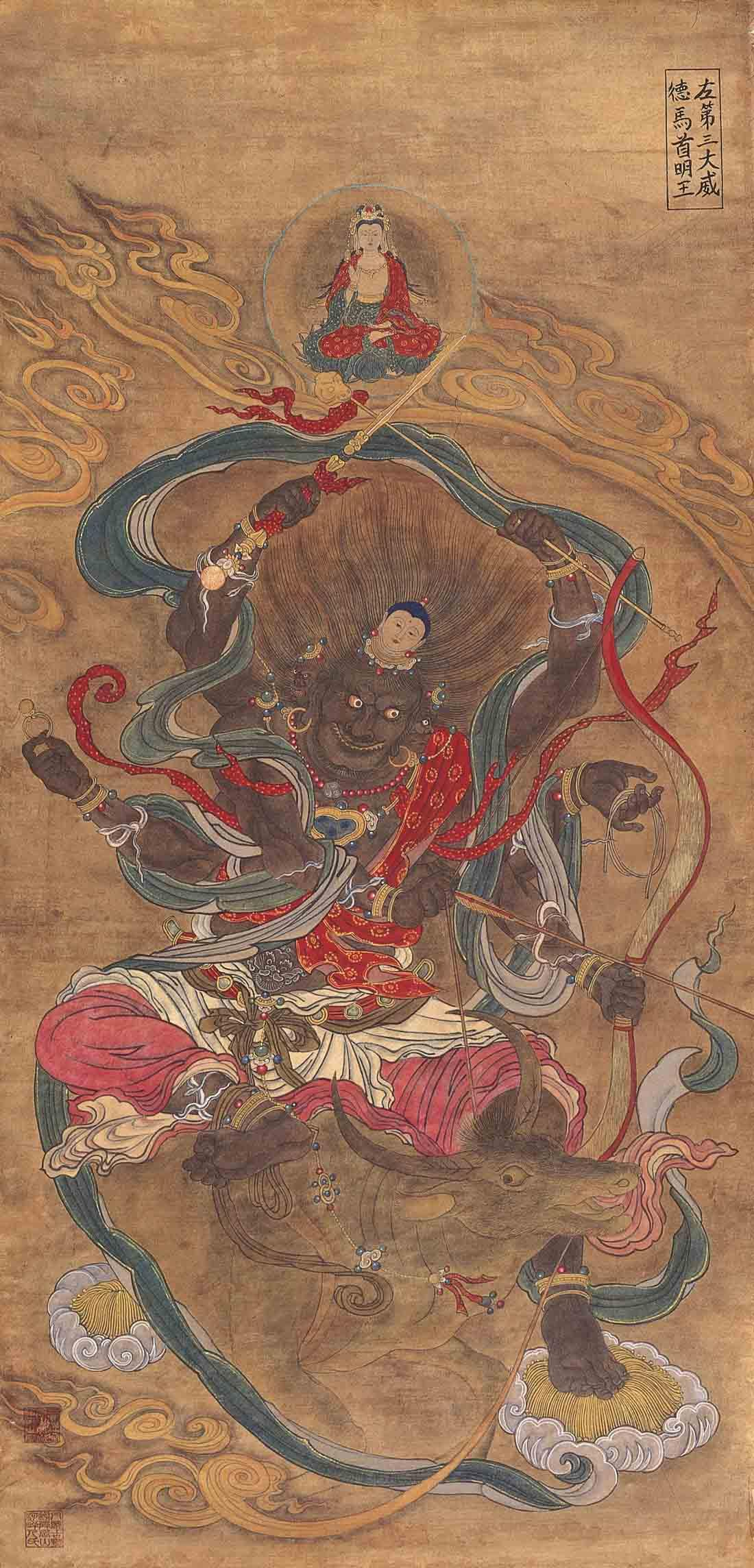
Ming dynasty (1368 - 1644) Shuilu ritual painting of Hayagriva (Chinese: Matou Mingwang), one out of a set depicting the Ten Wisdom Kings, at Baoning Temple in Shanxi, China.

Hayagriva ("having the neck of a horse", IAST: Hayagrīva) is an important deity in Chinese, Tibetan and Japanese Buddhism. He originated as a yaksha attendant of Avalokiteśvara (Guanyin) in India, and was assimilated into the ritual practices of early Buddhism. In Tibetan Buddhism, Hayagriva is a wrathful manifestation of Avalokiteshvara, and is considered an extremely wrathful male deity in the pantheon of Herukas in Vajrayana Buddhism. Hayagriva together with his female consort Vajravarahi (Dorje Pakmo) remove hindrances and are renowned for their epic conquering of the Buddhist demonized Hindu god Rudra.

Hayagriva's iconography encapsulates his embodiment of a wrathful manifestation of compassion, symbolizing an unwavering determination to surmount internal obstacles and external challenges. Displaying attributes such as a scowling countenance with three penetrating eyes, green horse heads, a raised sword, a threatening mudra, and symbolic ornaments, Hayagriva conveys an intense resolve in his representation. In Tibetan Buddhist practices, Hayagriva's significance is linked to his role in curing ailments, especially skin diseases like leprosy that are attributed to nāgas. Furthermore, specifically in the Nyingma school's Tibetan Buddhist Vajrayana practices, Black Hayagriva's role extends to confronting potent adversaries, exemplified through his and his consort Vajravarahi as Tröma Nagmo's cosmic battles against the demon Rudra and his epic earth-destructing demonic ego.

In Chinese Buddhism, Hayagriva assumes the mantle of a Dharma protector (dharmapala), particularly associated with travel and transportation. This is evidenced by the practice of placing license plates before his image within temples, invoking safeguarding influences for vehicles and their passengers. In the context of Japanese Mahayana Buddhism, he emerges as a form of Avalokiteśvara, with his dominion extending over beings embodying animal-like mental states.

== Iconography ==
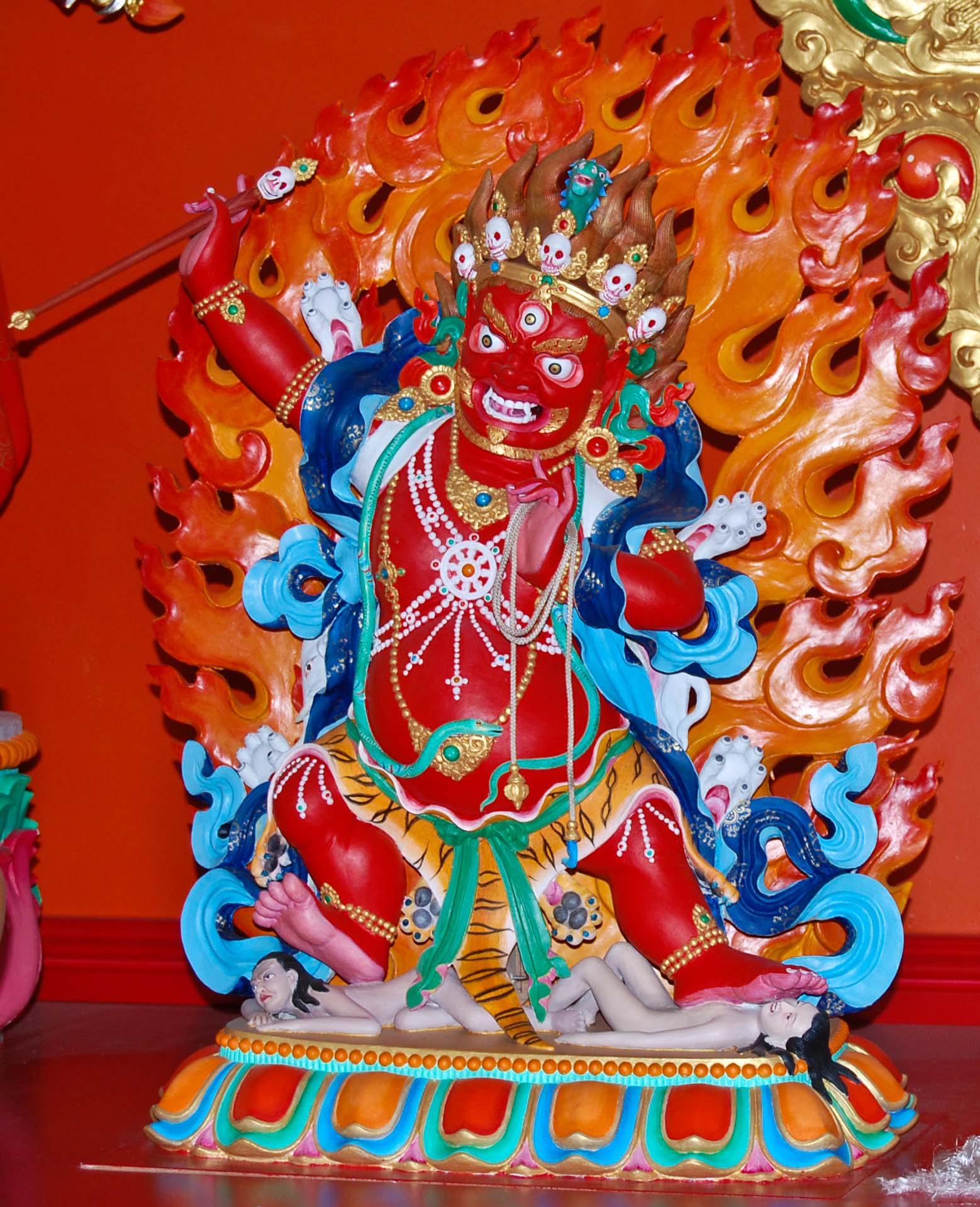
Hayagriva statue in Samye Ling. Note the green horse's head on top of his head.

In his simplest form, Hayagriva is depicted with one face, two arms and two legs, and a horse head above his head. His representation shows more of a wrathful personality - a scowling face with three glaring eyes, a roaring mouth with protruding fangs, a pose of a warrior, a broad belly bulging with inner energy, a sword raised threateningly in his right hand (poised to cut through delusion), his left hand raised in a gesture and snake ornaments. This aspect expresses compassion's determination to help overcome inner egotism and outer obstructions.

In other representations, Hayagriva has six hands, four or eight legs and three large eyes. In these versions, on the top of Hayagriva's head are three small green horse heads. The legs stand on two corpses, symbolizing the mundane attachments that should be destroyed.

== In Tibet ==
In Tibet, Hayagriva was promoted especially by Buddhist teacher Atiśa and appeared as a worldly dharmapala. His special ability is to cure diseases, especially skin diseases even as serious as leprosy, which is said to be caused by nāgas.

According to Tibetan Buddhism, Hayagriva is the wrathful form of Vajrasattva, who assumes the form Avalokiteśvara and turns into Hayagriva in order to defeat the powerful demon Rudra, who has submitted the gods. He is accompanied by Vajrapani, who assumes the power of Tara and then becomes the wrathful Vajravārāhī. The two are cosmically related to Rudra, as in their previous lives, Vajrasattva was Rudra's master, while Vajrapani was his fellow disciple, who unlike Rudra understood and respected dharma. Hayagriva and Vajravarahi challenge Rudra through nine mighty dances and battle with him, and at the end, Hayagriva turns diminutive and enters Rudra's anus, after which he turns into a giant and destroys him from inside out. Vanquished, Rudra promises to become a protector of dharma, and his demonic body is worn as a garb by Hayagriva, who emerges with his horse head from the skull.

In another version, Vajrasattva impersonates Rudra and seduces the latter's wife, the rakshasha queen Krodhisvari. Hayagriva is reborn as the resultant child, Vajrarakshasha, who takes over Rudra's realm, submits him and destroys him by plunging a three-pointed khaṭvāṅga into his chest. He then devours Rudra, purifies him in his stomach and excretes him turned into a servant of dharma, who hands his army of demons to him as attendants.

== In China ==
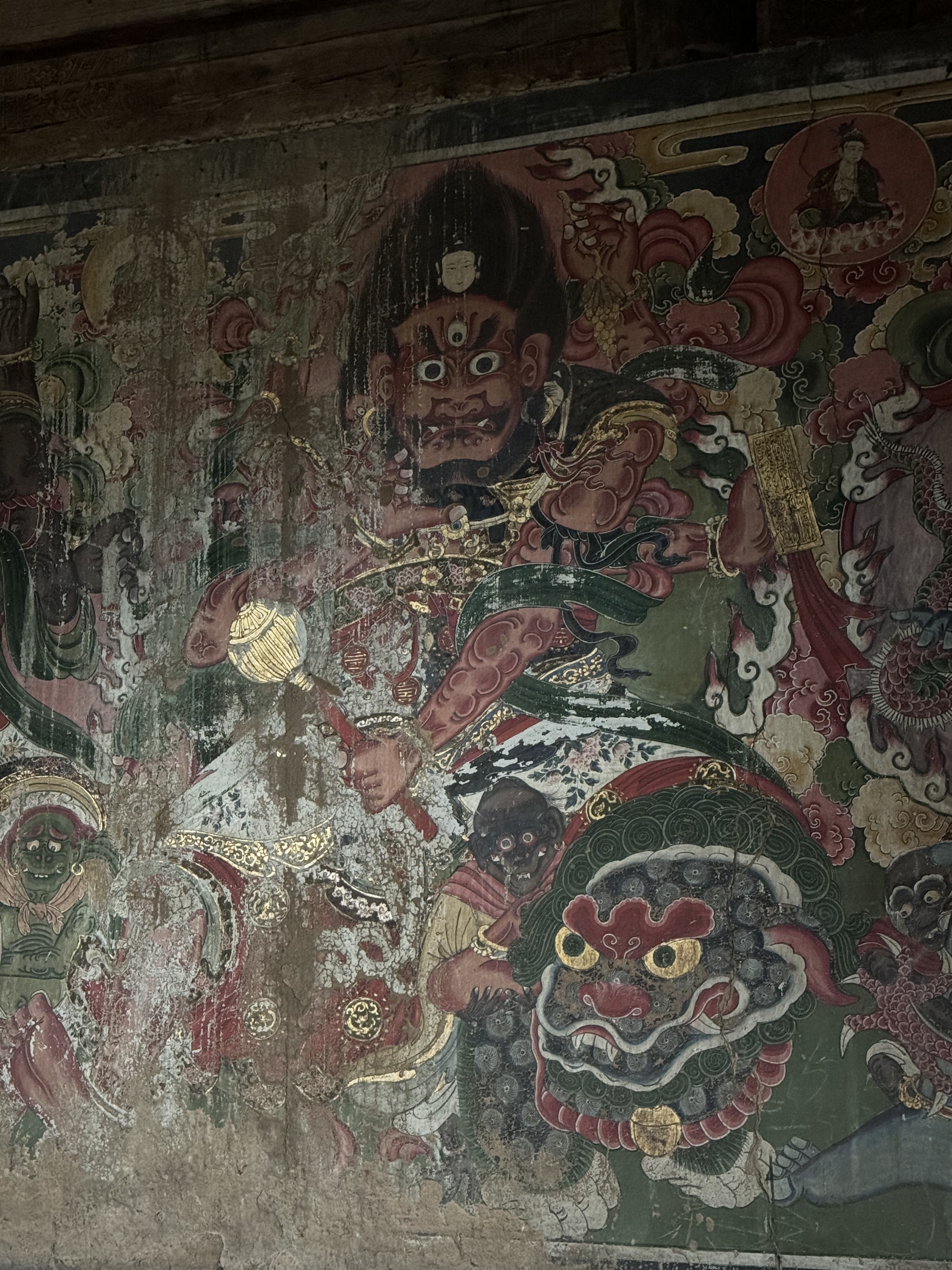
Ming dynasty (1368–1644) wall mural of Hayagriva, one out of a set depicting the Ten Wisdom Kings, at in Yong'an Temple^{[zh]} in Hunyuan, Shanxi, China

In Chinese Buddhism, Hayagriva is known as Mǎtóu Guānyīn (馬頭觀音; "Hayagrīva-Avalokiteśvara/ Horse Head Avalokiteśvara"); Guanyin is the Chinese representation of Avalokiteśvara. He is venerated as a guardian protector of travel and transportation, especially for cars, and is sometimes placed at the entrance and exits of temples to bless visitors. In some temples, visitors are allowed to have their license plates enshrined in front of an image of this deity to invoke his protection over their vehicle. He is also counted as one of the 500 Arhats, where he is known as Mǎtóu Zūnzhě (馬頭尊者; 'The Venerable Horse Head'). Similar to Japan, he is also considered to be one of the six Avalokiteśvaras intended to save the sentient beings of the six realms of Saṃsāra, with his sphere being the realm of animals (or beings whose state of mind are animal-like). He is commonly conflated with another form of Avalokiteśvara that also performs this same function in the Tiantai tradition: Amoti Avalokiteśvara (阿摩提觀音; Āmótí Guānyīn) or "Lion Fearless Guanyin" (獅子無畏觀音; Shīzǐ Wúwèi Guānyīn), which is considered to be one of thirty-three main incarnations of Avalokiteśvara and is often portrayed in iconography as riding on a white lion as a mount. He is regularly invoked alongside the other Ten Wisdom Kings in ceremonies and rituals, such as the Shuilu fahui, where they are offered offerings and entreated to expel evil from the ritual platform.

In Taoism, Hayagriva was syncretized and incorporated within the Taoist pantheon as the god Mǎ Wáng (馬王; 'Horse King'), who is associated with fire. In this form, he is usually portrayed with 6 arms and a third eye on the forehead.

In Chinese folk tradition, Hayagriva was sometimes assimilated into Horse-Face, one of two theriomorphic guardians of Diyu, the underworld. Some Chinese horse owners also worship Hayagriva in a non underworld form to protect their horses.

== In Japan ==
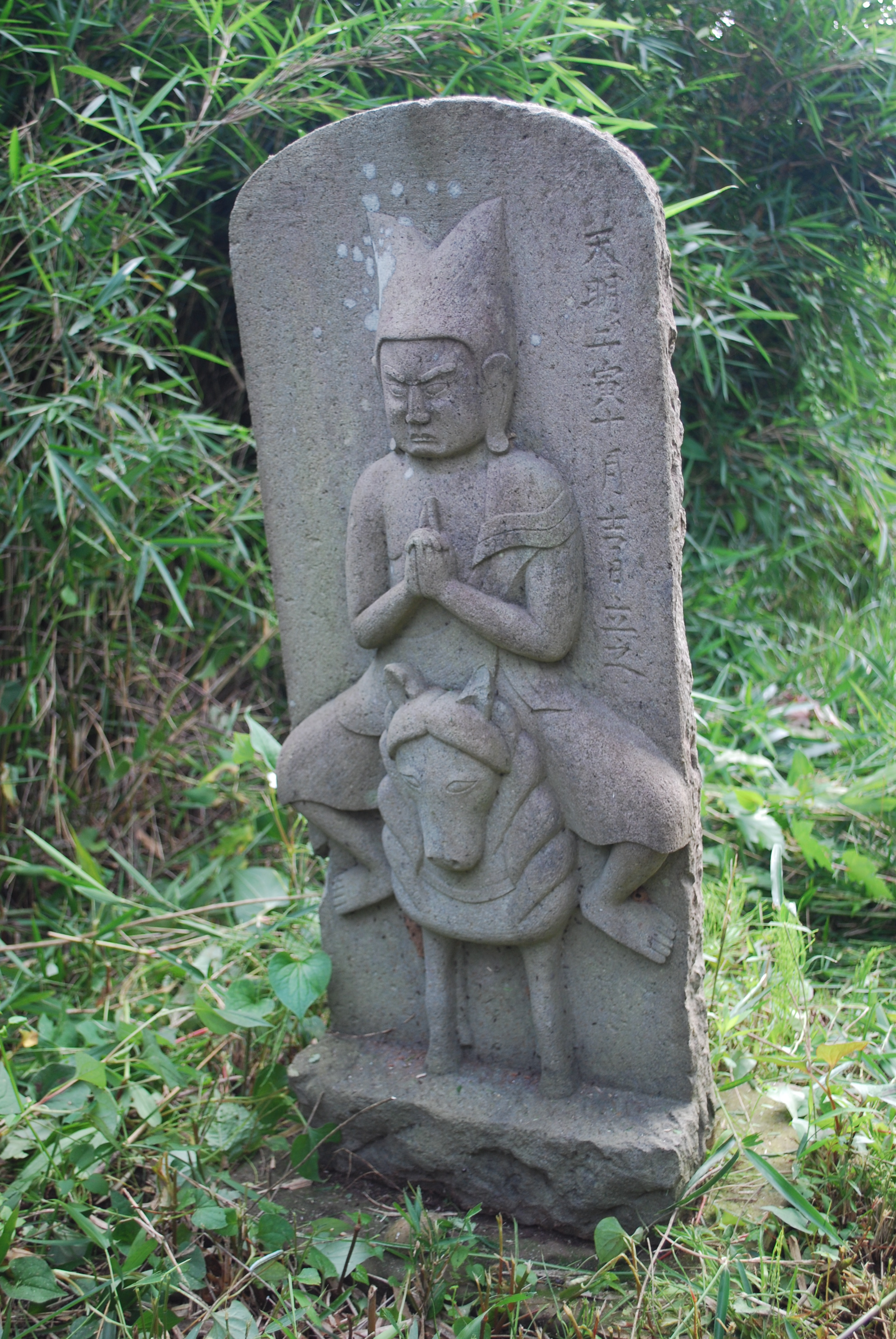
Statue of Hayagriva at a roadside shrine in Japan

In Japanese Mahayana Buddhism, Hayagriva is considered a form of Avalokiteśvara with wrathful form (Batō Kannon 馬頭觀音, lit. Hayagrīva-Avalokiteśvara/ Horse Head Avalokiteśvara), one of the six Avalokiteśvaras. Hayagriva's sphere is realm of animals (or beings whose state of mind are animal-like). In Folk religion in Japan, Hayagriva was also worshipped as the guardian deity for horses because of its name Horse-head (Batō). The horse was symbolized as a vehicle, not as one of Hayagriva's heads.
