= Six Guanyin =

Aspect of Buddhism

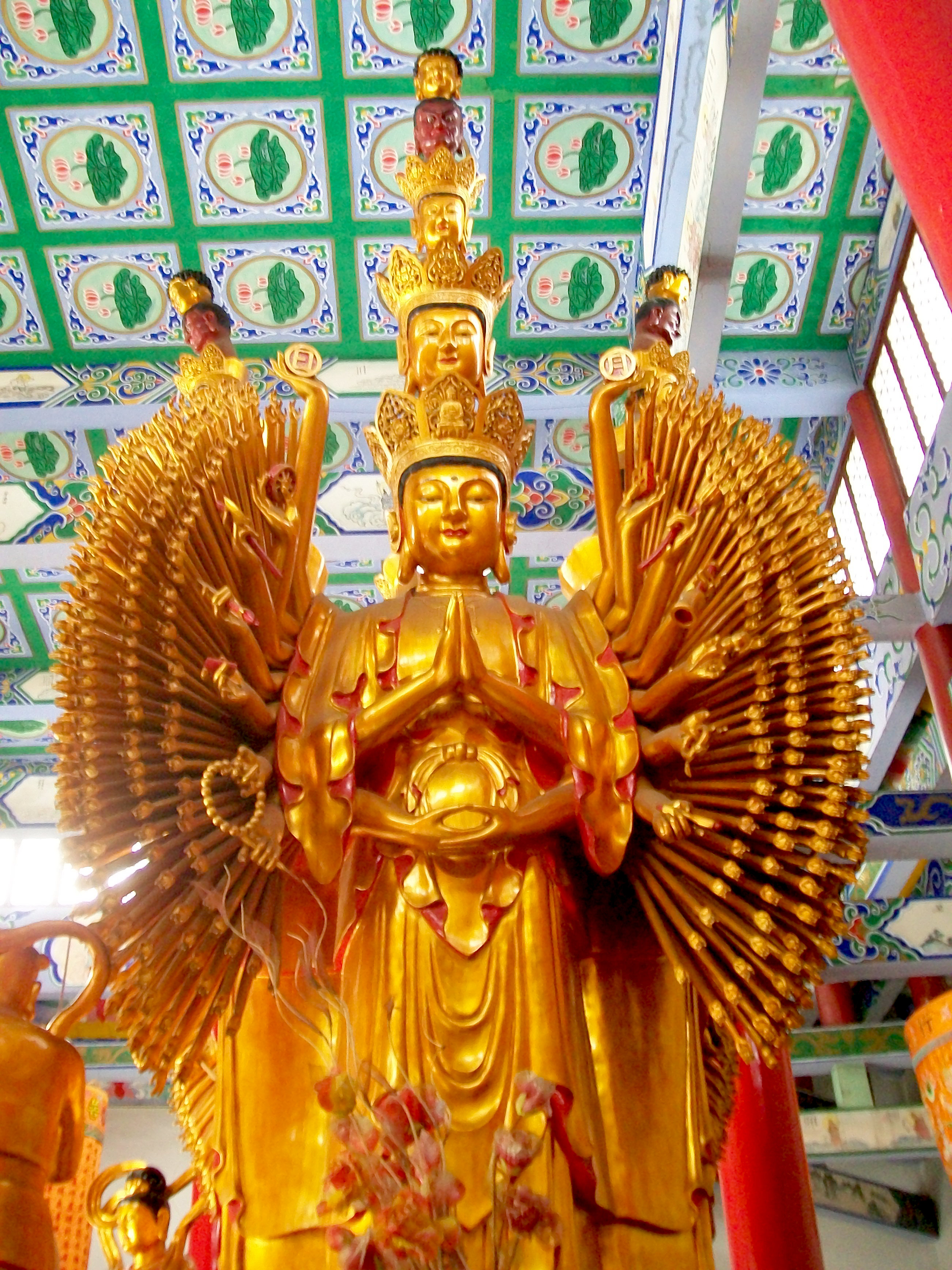
Thousand-Armed Avalokiteśvara (Sanskrit: Sahasra-bhuja Avalokiteśvara)

In East Asian Buddhism, the Six Guanyin or Six forms of Avalokitesvara (Chinese 六觀音 (traditional) / 六观音 (simplified), pinyin: Liù Guānyīn; Jyutping: luk6 Gun1 jam1; Korean: 육관음, Yuk Gwaneum; Japanese: 六観音, Roku Kannon, Rokkannon; Vietnamese: Lục Quán Âm) is a grouping of six manifestations of the Bodhisattva Avalokiteśvara, known as Guanyin (Guanshiyin) in Chinese and Kannon (Kanzeon) in Japanese.

== Overview ==
A list of six incarnations of the bodhisattva Avalokiteśvara (Guanyin / Kannon) first appears in the Mohe Zhiguan by the Tiantai patriarch Zhiyi (538–597 CE), where these are equated with the six syllables of the dhārāṇī contained in the Dhārāṇī Sūtra of Invoking Avalokiteśvara Bodhisattva to Dissipate Poison and Harm (請觀世音菩薩消伏毒害陀羅尼呪經; Taishō Tripitaka 1043) and associated to each of the six states of existence. These six, representing Avalokiteśvara's six qualities, are said to have the power to destroy the three kinds of obstacles (三障) (Note: Obstacles that arise from (1) the three poisons of greed, anger, and ignorance, (2) bad karma generated by committing any of the five cardinal sins or ten evil acts; and (3) the negative karmic effects of actions in the three evil paths.) in these realms.

1. Avalokiteśvara as Great Mercy (Chinese: 大慈觀世音, pinyin: Dàcí Guānshìyīn; Jp. Daiji Kanzeon) - Savior of beings in Naraka
2. Avalokiteśvara as Great Compassion (大悲觀世音, Dàbēi Guānshìyīn, Jp. Daihi Kannon) - Savior of pretas
3. Fearless Lion-like Avalokiteśvara (獅子無畏觀世音, Shīzǐ Wúwèi Guānshìyīn; Jp. Shishi Mui Kanzeon) - Savior of animals
4. Avalokiteśvara of the Universally Shining Great Light (大光普照觀世音, Dàguāng Pǔzhào Guānshìyīn; Jp. Daikō Fushō Kanzeon) - Savior of asuras
5. Avalokiteśvara as the Divine Hero (天人丈夫觀世音, Tiānrén Zhàngfū Guānshìyīn; Jp. Tennin Jōbu Kanzeon) - Savior of humans
6. Avalokiteśvara as Mahābrahmā the Profound (大梵深遠觀世音, Dàfàn Shēnyuǎn Guānshìyīn; Jp. Daibon Shin'on Kanzeon) - Savior of devas

A variant of this list was imported to Japan from China by the Tendai monk Enchin (856–891). By the end of the Heian period, the Shingon monk Ningai (仁海, 951–1046), claiming the authority of "earlier masters," associated the six incarnations of the Mohe Zhiguan with six esoteric forms of Avalokiteśvara:

1. Great Mercy - Āryāvalokiteśvara (聖觀音 / 正觀音, Shèng Guānyīn / Zhèng Guānyīn; Jp. Shō-Kannon)
2. Great Compassion - Sahasrabhuja (千手觀音, Qiānshǒu Guānyīn; Jp. Senju Kannon)
3. Horse Head - Hayagrīva (馬頭觀音, Mǎtóu Guānyīn; Jp. Batō Kannon)
4. Great Light - Ekādaśamukha (十一面觀音, Shíyīmiàn Guānyīn; Jp. Jūichimen Kannon)
5. Divine Hero - Cundī (準提觀音, Zhǔntí Guānyīn; Jp. Jundei / Juntei Kannon or 准提佛母, Zhǔntí Fómǔ; Jp. Jundei / Juntei Butsumo)
6. Mahābrahmā - Cintāmaṇicakra (如意輪觀音; Rúyìlún Guānyīn; Jp. Nyoirin Kannon)

The Japanese Tendai school eventually adopted the new list, substituting Amoghapāśa (不空羂索觀音, Bùkōng Juànsuǒ Guānyīn; Jp. Fukū Kensaku / Kenjaku Kannon) for Cundī. (Note: There is some disagreement between various schools and lineages about Cundī's nature: although sometimes classified as a manifestation of Avalokiteśvara, other interpretations see her as a distinct bodhisattva while still others interpret her as a Buddhamātṛ (佛母, Fómǔ; Jp. 仏母, Butsumo, lit. "mother of buddhas"), a deified aspect of the knowledge that give birth to the buddhas and bodhisattvas.)

== See also ==
- Cheontae
- Eleven-Faced Avalokitesvara Heart Dharani Sutra
- Nilakantha Dharani
- Om mani padme hum
- Tendai
- Tiantai

== Bibliography ==
- Fowler, Sherry D. (2016). Accounts and Images of Six Kannon in Japan. University of Hawaii Press. ISBN 978-0-8248-5622-9.
- Faure, Bernard (2015). The Fluid Pantheon: Gods of Medieval Japan, Volume 1. University of Hawaii Press. ISBN 978-0-8248-5702-8.
