= Bīja =

Sanskrit term meaning "seed"

In Hinduism, Jainism and Buddhism, the Sanskrit term Bīja (बीज) (Jp. 種子 shuji) (Chinese 種子 zhǒngzǐ), literally seed, is used as a metaphor for the origin or cause of things and cognate with bindu.

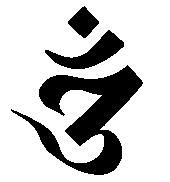
The Om bija in Esoteric Buddhism

== Buddhist theory of karmic seeds ==
Various schools of Buddhist thought held that karmic effects arose out of seeds that were latent in an individual's mindstream or psycho-physical continuum. Rupert Gethin describes the theory thus:

When I perform an action motivated by greed, it plants a 'seed' in the series of dharmas [phenomena] that is my mind. Such a seed is not a thing in itself - a dharma but merely the modification or 'perfuming' of the subsequent flow of dharmas consequent upon the action. In the course of time this modification matures and issues in a particular result, in the same way as a seed does not produce its fruit immediately, but only after the 'modifications' of the shoot, stem, leaf, and flower.

The Sautrantika school held such a theory as did the Mahasamghikas and the early Mahasisakas. The Sautrantika Sthavira Srilata held a conception of "subsidiary element" (anudhatu or *purvanudhatu) which also corresponds to this theory of seeds. The seed theory was defended by the Buddhist philosopher Vasubandhu in his Abhidharmakosha who mentions that is the view of the “old teachers” (purvacarya). It is also present in the Viniscayasamgrahani of the Yogacarabhumi. In the Bashyam Vasubandhu connects the Sautrantika theory of seeds with the notion of the latent defilements or anusaya:

The Sautrantikas define anusayas as kleshas in the state of seeds and say that they are not separate dravyas (substances). Anusayas are dormant, i.e., not actualized, while paryavasthanas (active defilements) are awakened.

Likewise, the Nyayanusara of Sanghabhadra states that the theory had different terms to refer to "seeds":

There are certain masters who give different names to these seeds, each according to his own understanding. Some call them subsidiary elements (anudhatu), others call them impressions (vasana); still others call them capability (samarthya), non-disappearance (avipranasa), or accumulation (upacaya).

The theory is considerably extended in the Consciousness-only teachings of the Yogacara school of Buddhism. According to this theory, all experiences and actions produce bīja as impressions, stored in the alaya (storehouse) consciousness. The external world is produced when the seeds "perfume" this consciousness.

== As mantras ==
In Vajrayana Buddhism and Hinduism, the term bīja is used for mystical "seed syllables" contained within mantras or standalone seed syllable mantras (bijamantra). These seeds do not have specific linguistic meaning nor are they name mantras, but they may stand for specific principles, deities, powers, or ideas.

The best-known bīja syllable is Om, first found in the Hindu scriptures the Upanishads. In Buddhism, the most important seed syllable is the letter A bija.

In some tantric traditions, the Bija of the 'Varnamala' (Sanskrit; English: "garland of letters"; which may be rendered as alphabet) are understood as aniconic representations and sound embodiments of the matrikas (a group of goddesses).

In Tibetan Buddhism the seed syllables corresponding to the trikaya are: a white oṃ (enlightened body), a red āḥ (enlightened speech) and a blue hūṃ (enlightened mind).

In the Bön tradition of Tibet, it's a little different: a white āḥ, a red oṃ and a blue hūṃ.

Bijas are often the vehicle of esoteric transmission of terma to a 'tertön' (Tibetan; English: "revealer of terma"), such as that experienced by Dudjom Lingpa.

== Cross-cultural correlates ==
Guruwari of the Indigenous Australian peoples is an interesting cross cultural correlate and may be cognate. See also gankyil of the Vajrayana tradition, which is cognate with bindu. In fieldwork published in Aboriginal Men of High Degree, A.P. Elkin cites what he considers to be evidence that traders from Indonesia brought fleeting contact with Buddhism and Hinduism to areas near modern-day Dampier. Traditions of Mantrayana were also evident in Indonesia, e.g. Candi Sukuh. And it is in the Vajrayana and Mantrayana traditions of esoteric transmission where bija take precedence. Indeed, bija defines Mantrayana. Elkin interpreted a link between Indigenous Australian culture and Buddhist ideas such as reincarnation. He argued this link could have been brought through contact with Macassan traders.

== See also ==
- Bindu
- Gankyil
- Surya Namaskar - the Sun Salutation, in which each posture is sometimes associated with a Bīja mantra
