= Ernest G. McClain =

Ernest Glenn McClain (August 6, 1918 – April 25, 2014) was a professor of music at Brooklyn College from 1951 to 1982. McClain is known for his efforts to analyze music in the context of ancient knowledge of mathematics and philosophy.

== Life ==
McClain was born on August 6, 1918, in Massillon, Ohio. A 1936 graduate of Washington High School, Ohio, he studied at the Oberlin Conservatory of Music, where he graduated in 1940 with a degree in Music Education. After graduation, he worked in the Wadsworth, Ohio, school district, but soon joined the Air Corps for World War II, where he became a lieutenant and was stationed in New Guinea and the Philippines. On his return from the war, he studied for a Master's degree in Music Education (1947) from Northwestern University, then took music instructor positions at Denison University in Granville, Ohio, and the University of Hawaiʻi. After receiving a doctorate in Music Education from Teachers College, Columbia University, he joined the Music Faculty of Brooklyn College (part of the City University of New York) in 1951, where he taught until his retirement in 1982. He died on April 25, 2014, in Washington, D.C.

== Work ==
McClain credits colleagues Ernst Levy and Siegmund Levarie and their writings for introducing him to Pythagoreanism via the insights of 19th century theorist Albert von Thimus, who provided the keys to unlocking Plato's mathematical riddles. His three books were published during a decade of further collaboration with Antonio de Nicolas, that opened a window into other ancient philosophical and religious writings.

His writings offer a musical-mathematical explanation of crucial passages in texts of world literature, including the Bible, the Rig Veda, the Egyptian Book of the Dead, and Plato. All of these passages deal with numbers that he claimed had either been ignored or misinterpreted throughout the centuries. McClain's explanation is based on the meanings of these numbers within the context of the quadrivium, the four ancient mathematical disciplines of arithmetic, music, geometry and astronomy. He argued that his discovery of identical or similar numbers and parallel mathematical constructs in Sumer, Egypt, Babylon, Palestine and Greece, suggests the historical continuity of a common spiritual tradition linking the microcosm of the soul to the macrocosm of the universe. His work provides much of the missing mathematical detail for what scholars often call the Music of the Spheres.

== Books published ==
- Myth of Invariance: The Origins of the Gods, Mathematics and Music from the Rg Veda to Plato (Nicolas-Hays 1976), ISBN 978-0-89254-012-9
- The Pythagorean Plato: Prelude to the song itself (Nicolas-Hays 1978), ISBN 978-0-89254-010-5
- Meditations Through the Quran: Tonal Images in an Oral Culture (Nicolas-Hays 1981), ISBN 978-0-89254-009-9. Cited as "additional reading" by the Encyclopædia Britannica article on the Quran.
