= Guruwari =

Guruwari or "totem design" or "seed power" is an idea that appears in the Warlpiri language of the culture of indigenous Australian peoples. Guruwari is intimately associated with The Dreaming.

Guruwari also refers to the energetic "pattern" in the Aboriginal concept that states that every activity or process leaves an "energetic residue" in the ground, similar to plants leaving an image of themselves in the shape of the seeds. It is, consequently, an important part of the fields and it imprints its metaphysical, deep meaning.
