= Kuṇḍali =

Buddhist wrathful deity

Amṛtakuṇḍalin
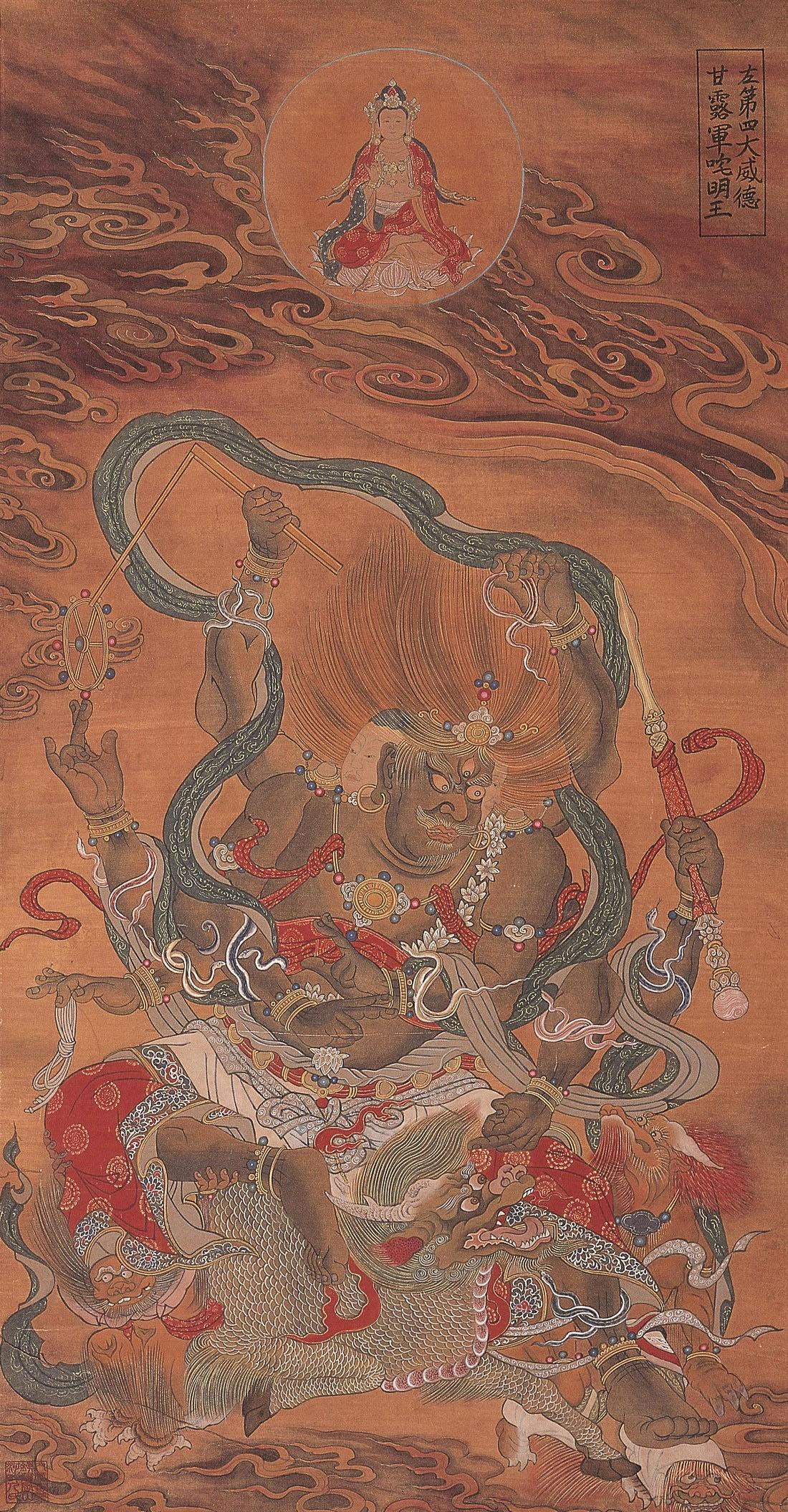
- Ming dynasty (1368-1644) shuilu ritual painting of Kundali (Juntuli Mingwang), one out of a set depicting the Ten Wisdom Kings, from Baoning Temple in Shanxi, China
- Sanskrit: अमृतकुण्डलिन् (Amṛtakuṇḍalin); अमृतकुण्डलि (Amṛtakuṇḍali); कुण्डलि (Kuṇḍali)
- Chinese: (Traditional) 軍荼利明王; (Simplified) 军荼利明王; (Pinyin: Jūntúlì Míngwáng)
- Japanese: 軍荼利明王 (Gundari Myōō); 甘露軍荼利明王 (Kanro Gundari Myōō); 軍荼利夜叉明王 (Gundari Yasha Myōō); 大咲明王 (Taishō Myōō); 吉利吉利明王 (Kirikiri Myōō)
- Korean: 군다리명왕 (Gundali Myeongwang)

Information
- Venerated by: Vajrayana Buddhism, Mahayana Buddhism, Shugendō
- Attributes: vajra, axe, wheel, trident, snake

Kundali (Sanskrit: कुण्डलि; IAST: Kuṇḍali) or Amritakundalin (अमृतकुण्डलिन्, Amṛtakuṇḍalin), also known in Chinese as Juntuli Mingwang (simplified Chinese: 军荼利明王; traditional Chinese: 軍荼利明王; pinyin: Jūntúlì Míngwáng) and in Japanese as Gundari Myōō (軍荼利明王), is a wrathful deity and dharmapala (protector of the Dharma) in East Asian Esoteric Buddhism.

In Buddhist thought, Amritakundalin is seen as the dispenser of Amrita, the celestial nectar of immortality. When classified among the Five Wisdom Kings (vidyārāja), fierce incarnations or emissaries of the Five Wisdom Buddhas, he is considered to be the manifestation of Ratnasambhava, one of the five buddhas who is associated with the southern direction. When classified among the Eight Wisdom Kings, he is considered to be the manifestation of the bodhisattva Akashagarbha and is associated with the north-west direction. When classified among the Ten Wisdom Kings, he is considered to be the manifestation of Amitabha, another of the Five Wisdom Buddhas.

== Worship ==
=== Bīja and mantra ===
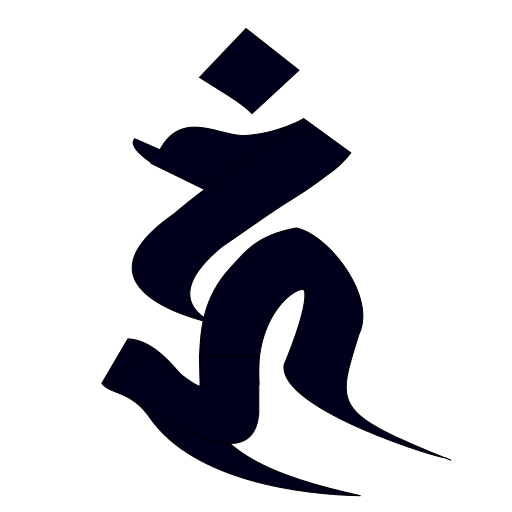
huṃ (हुं), Kundali's seed syllable in Siddham script

The bīja or seed syllable used to represent Kundali is huṃ (Devanagari: हुं; Chinese and Japanese: 吽; pinyin: hōng; rōmaji: un), written in Siddham script.

Kundali's mantra is as follows:

Oṃ amṛte hūṃ phaṭ traditional Chinese: 唵 婀密哩帝 吽 頗吒; pinyin: Ǎn ēmìlīdì hōng pōzhā; Japanese: おん あみりてい うん はった; rōmaji: On amiritei un hatta

== See also ==
- Wisdom King
  - Acala
  - Trailokyavijaya
  - Yamantaka
  - Vajrayakṣa
  - Hayagriva
  - Mahamayuri
- Ratnasambhava
- Kangiten
- Kundalini
