= Wisdom King =

Wrathful deity in East Asian Buddhism

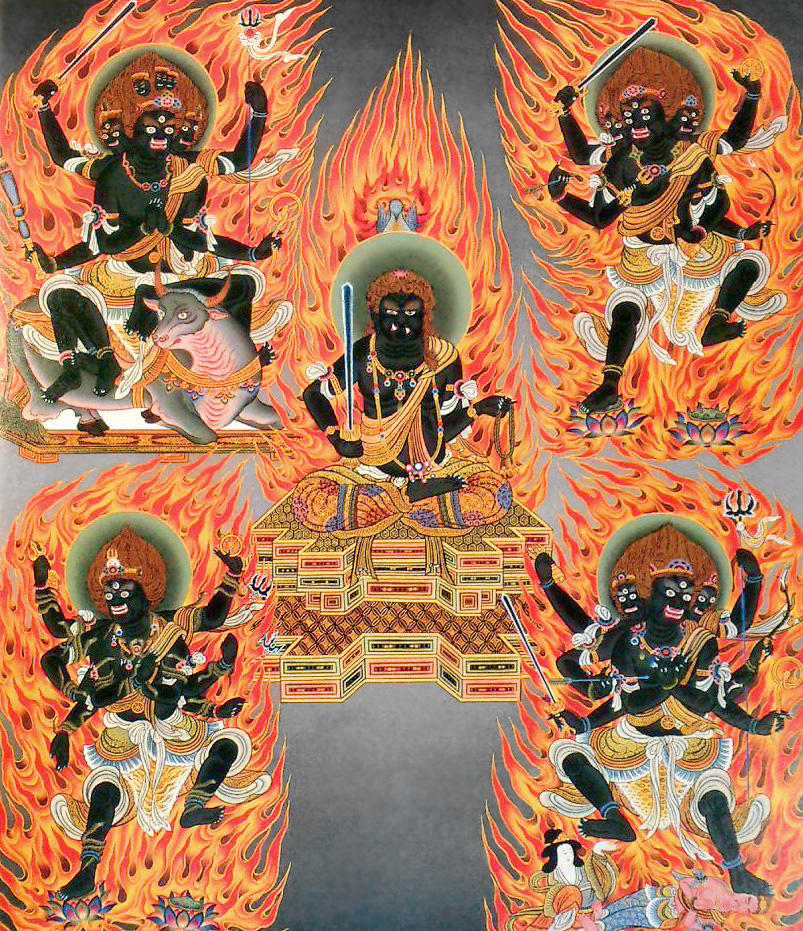
The Five Wisdom Kings (五大明王, Godai Myōō). Clockwise starting from the top right: Vajrayakṣa, Trailokyavijaya, Kuṇḍali, and Yamāntaka. Acala is at the center.

A wisdom king (Sanskrit: विद्याराज; IAST: vidyārāja, Chinese: 明王; pinyin: Míngwáng; Japanese pronunciation: Myōō) is a type of wrathful deity in East Asian Buddhism.

Whereas the Sanskrit name is translated literally as "wisdom / knowledge king(s)," the term vidyā in Vajrayana Buddhism is also specifically used to denote mantras; the term may thus also be rendered "mantra king(s)." Vidyā is translated in Chinese with the character 明 (lit. "bright, radiant", figuratively "knowledge(able), wisdom, wise"), leading to a wide array of alternative translations such as "bright king(s)" or "radiant king(s)". A similar category of fierce deities known as herukas are found in Tibetan Buddhism.

The female counterparts of wisdom kings are known as wisdom queens (Sanskrit (IAST): vidyārājñī, Chinese and Japanese: 明妃; pinyin: Míngfēi; rōmaji: Myōhi).

== Overview ==
=== Development ===
Vidyārājas, as their name suggests, are originally conceived of as the guardians and personifications of esoteric wisdom (vidyā), namely mantras and dharanis. They were seen as embodying the mystic power contained in these sacred utterances.

During the early stages of esoteric (Vajrayana) Buddhism, many of the deities that would become known as vidyārājas (a term that only came into use around the late 7th-early 8th century) were mainly seen as attendants of bodhisattvas who were invoked for specific ends such as the removal of misfortune and obstacles to enlightenment. They personified certain attributes of these bodhisattvas such as their wisdom or the power of their voices and were held to perform various tasks such as gathering together sentient beings to whom the bodhisattva preaches, subjugating unruly elements, or protecting adherents of Buddhism. Eventually, these divinities became objects of veneration in their own right; no longer necessarily paired with a bodhisattva, they became considered as the manifestations of the bodhisattvas themselves and/or of buddhas, who are believed to assume terrifying forms as a means to save sentient beings out of compassion for them. A belief prevalent in the Japanese tradition known as the sanrinjin (三輪身, "bodies of the three wheels") theory for instance posits that five Wisdom Kings are the fierce incarnations (教令輪身, kyōryōrin-shin, lit. "embodiments of the wheel of injunction") of the Five Wisdom Buddhas, who appear both as gentle bodhisattvas who teach the Dharma through compassion and as terrifying vidyārājas who teach through fear, shocking nonbelievers into faith.

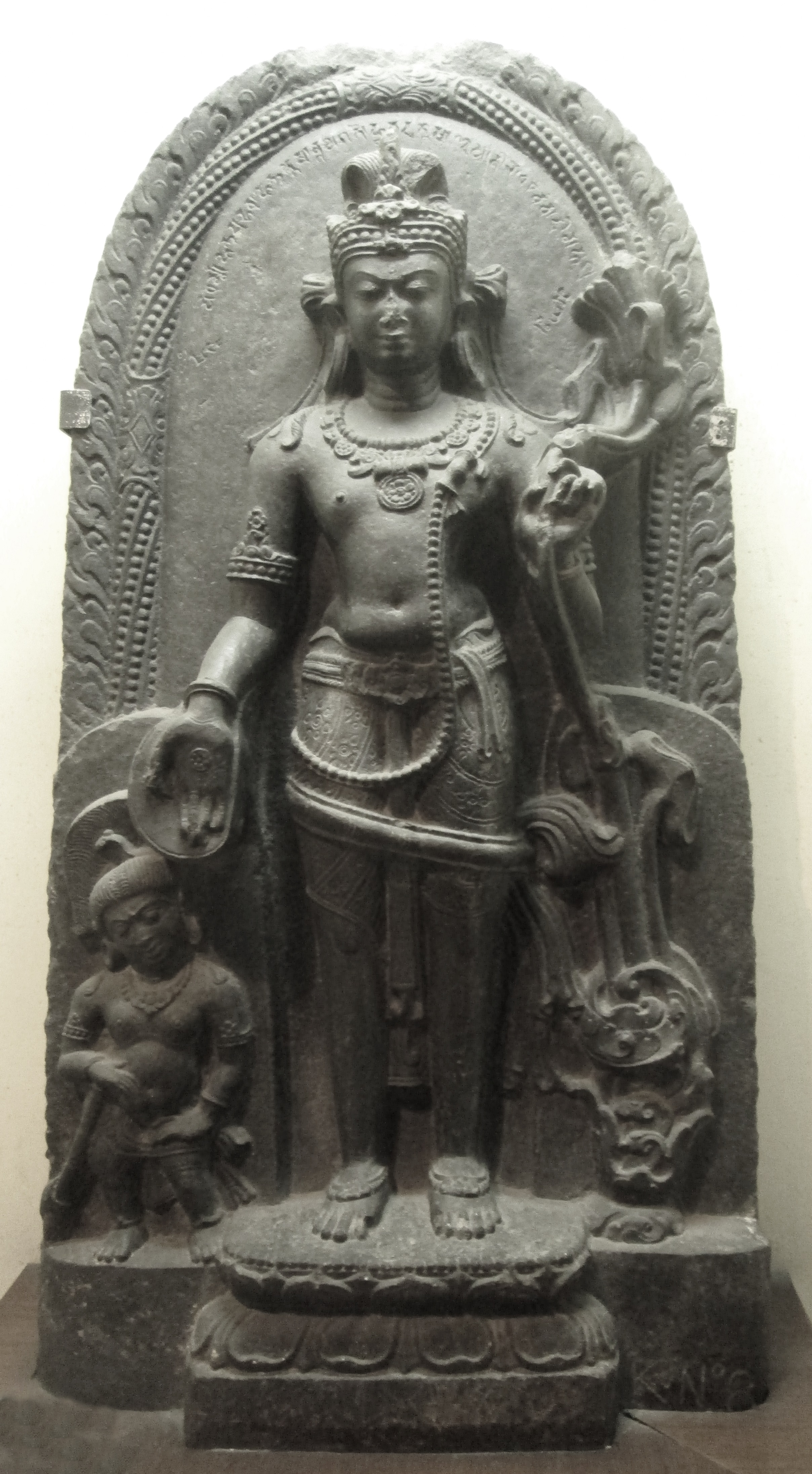
Manjushri with Yamāntaka, from Kurkihar (Bihar), currently at the Indian Museum in Kolkata. 10th century.

The evolution of the vidyārāja will be illustrated here by the deity Yamāntaka, one of the earliest Buddhist wrathful deities. In the 6th century text Mañjuśrī-mūla-kalpa, Yamāntaka is portrayed as the oath-bound servant of the bodhisattva Mañjuśrī who assembles all beings from across the world to hear the Buddha's preaching and vanquishes (and converts) those who are hostile to Buddhism; at the same time, Yamāntaka is also the personification of Mañjuśrī's dharani, the benefits of which are identical to his abilities. He was also commonly depicted in statuary along with Mañjuśrī as a diminutive yaksha-like attendant figure.

Later, as Yamāntaka and similar subordinates of various bodhisattvas (e.g. Hayagrīva, who was associated with Avalokiteśvara) became fully independent deities, they began to be portrayed by themselves and increasingly acquired iconographic attributes specific to each. Yamāntaka, for instance, is commonly shown with six heads, arms, and legs and riding or standing on a buffalo mount. The status and function of these deities have shifted from being minor emissaries who gather together and intimidate recalcitrant beings to being intimately involved in the primary task of esoteric Buddhism: the transformation of passions and ignorance (avidyā) into compassion and wisdom. As a result of this development, the relationship between Mañjuśrī and Yamāntaka was recontextualized such that Yamāntaka is now considered to be the incarnation of Mañjuśrī himself (so the Mañjuśrī-nāma-samgīti). Eventually, in the sanrinjin interpretation of Japanese esoteric Buddhism, both Yamāntaka and Mañjuśrī - under the name Vajratīkṣṇa (金剛利菩薩, Kongōri Bosatsu) - became classified as avatars of the buddha Amitābha.

Other Wisdom Kings followed a more or less similar development. Hayagrīva, for example, was originally the horse-headed incarnation of the Hindu god Vishnu which was adopted into Buddhism as Avalokiteśvara's attendant (although unlike the Hindu Hayagrīva, the Buddhist figure was never portrayed with a horse's head, instead being depicted like Yamāntaka as a yaksha who may have a miniature horse head emerging from his hair). Eventually, as Hayagrīva increasingly rose to prominence, the distinction between him and his superior became increasingly blurred so that he ultimately turned into one of Avalokiteśvara's many guises in both China and Japan. One of the more famous vidyārājas, Acala (Acalanātha), was originally an acolyte or messenger of the buddha Vairocana before he was interpreted as Vairocana's fierce aspect or kyōryōrin-shin in the Japanese tradition. (In Nepal and Tibet, meanwhile, he is instead identified as the incarnation of either Mañjuśrī or the buddha Akṣobhya.)

== Iconography ==
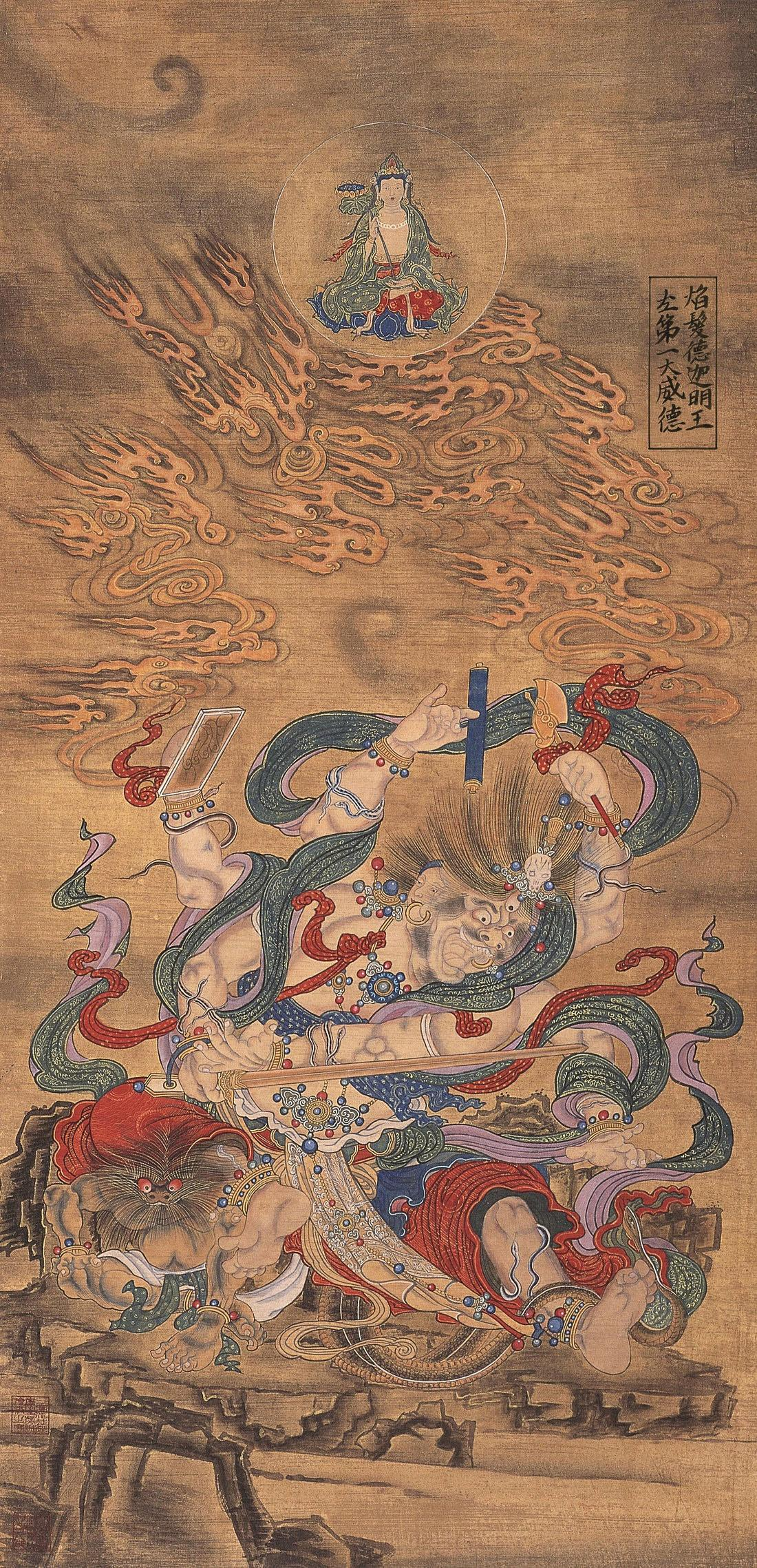
Ming dynasty (1368 - 1644) Shuilu ritual painting of Yamantaka (Dàwēidé Míngwáng), one out of a set depicting the Ten Wisdom Kings, at Baoning Temple^{[zh]} in Shanxi, China.

The iconography of Buddhist wrathful deities are usually considered to be derived from yaksha.

Wisdom Kings are usually represented as fierce-looking, often with blue or black skin and multiple heads, arms, and legs. They hold various weapons in their hands and are sometimes adorned with skulls, snakes or animal skins and wreathed in flames. This fiery aura is symbolically interpreted as the fire that purifies the practitioner and transforms one's passions into awakening, the so-called "fire samadhi" (火生三昧 kashō-zanmai).

Certain vidyārājas bear attributes that reflect the historical rivalry between Hinduism and Buddhism. For instance, the Wisdom King Trailokyavijaya is shown defeating and trampling on the deva Maheśvara (one of the Buddhist analogues to Shiva) and his consort Umā (Pārvatī). A commentary on the Mahavairocana Tantra by the Tang monk Yi Xing meanwhile attributes the taming of Maheśvara to another vidyārāja, Acala.

== List of Wisdom Kings ==
=== The Five Wisdom Kings ===
In Chinese and Japanese (Shingon and Tendai) esoteric Buddhism, the Five Great Wisdom Kings (五大明王, Godai Myōō; Wǔdà Míngwáng), also known as the Five Guardian Kings, are a group of vidyārājas who are considered to be both the fierce emanations of the Five Wisdom Buddhas and the guardians of Buddhist doctrine. Organized according to the five directions (the four cardinal points plus the center), the Five Kings are usually defined as follows:

- Acala / Acalanātha (Chinese: 不動明王; pinyin: Bùdòng Míngwáng; Japanese pronunciation: Fudō Myōō) - Manifestation of Mahāvairocana, associated with the center
- Trailokyavijaya (Chinese: 降三世明王; pinyin: Xiángsānshì Míngwáng; Japanese pronunciation: Gōzanze Myōō) - Manifestation of Akṣobhya, associated with the east
- Kuṇḍali / Amṛtakuṇḍalin (Chinese: 軍荼利明王; pinyin: Jūntúlì Míngwáng; Japanese pronunciation: Gundari Myōō) - Manifestation of Ratnasambhava, associated with the south
- Yamāntaka (Chinese: 大威徳明王; pinyin: Dàwēidé Míngwáng; Japanese pronunciation: Daiitoku Myōō) - Manifestation of Amitābha, associated with the west
- Vajrayakṣa (Chinese: 金剛夜叉明王; pinyin: Jīngāng Yèchā Míngwáng; Japanese pronunciation: Kongōyasha Myōō) - Manifestation of Amoghasiddhi, associated with the north in the Shingon school
  - Ucchuṣma (Chinese: 烏枢沙摩明王; pinyin: Wūshūshāmó Míngwáng; Japanese pronunciation: Ususama Myōō) - Associated with the north in the Tendai school

Vajrayakṣa or Ucchuṣma

(north)

Yamāntaka

(west)

Acala

(center)

Trailokyavijaya

(east)

Kuṇḍali

(south)

=== The Eight Wisdom Kings ===
In Chinese Buddhism, the Eight Great Wisdom Kings (八大明王; Bādà Míngwáng) is another grouping of Wisdom Kings that is depicted in statues, mural art and paintings. The acknowledged canonical source of the grouping of eight is The Sūtra of the Blazing Uṣṇīṣa of the Wondrous Vajra Kuṇḍali and Yamāntaka (大妙金剛大甘露軍拏利焰鬘熾盛佛頂經; Dàmiào Jīngāng Dà Gānlu Jūnnálì Yànmán Chìshèng Fódǐng Jīng). Another canonical source for the grouping of eight is the Mañjuśrī-mūla-kalpa (大方廣菩薩藏文殊舍利根本儀軌經; Dà Fāngguǎng Púsà Zàng Wénshūshèlì Gēnběn Yíguǐ Jīng; 'The Fundamental Ordinance of Mañjuśrī'), the Chinese translation of which, completed in about 980-1000 CE, is attributed to the monk Tianxizai, who is possibly the north Indian Shantideva. Each of the Wisdom Kings correspond to one of the Eight Great Bodhisattvas^{[zh]} in Chinese Buddhism as well as to a specific compass direction.

The Eight Wisdom Kings, with exceptions in certain lists, are usually defined as:

- Acala (不動明王; Bùdòng Míngwáng) - Manifestation of Sarvanivāraṇaviṣkambhin, associated with the north-east
- Kuṇḍali (軍荼利明王; Jūntúlì Míngwáng) - Manifestation of Ākāśagarbha, associated with the north-west
- Trailokyavijaya (降三世明王; Xiángsānshì Míngwáng) - Manifestation of Vajrapāṇi, associated with the south-east
- Yamāntaka (大威徳明王; Dàwēidé Míngwáng) - Manifestation of Mañjuśrī, associated with the east
- Mahācakra (大輪明王; Dàlún Míngwáng) - Manifestation of Maitreya, associated with the south-west
- Padanakṣipa (步擲明王; Bùzhì Míngwáng) - Manifestation of Samantabhadra, associated with the north
- Aparājita (無能勝明王; Wúnéngshèng Míngwáng) - Manifestation of Kṣitigarbha, associated with the south
- Hayagrīva (馬頭明王; Mǎtóu Míngwáng) - Manifestation of Avalokiteśvara (Guanyin), associated with the west

Kuṇḍali

(north-west)

Padanakṣipa

(north)

Acala

(north-east)

Hayagrīva

(west)

Yamāntaka

(east)

Mahācakra

(south-west)

Aparājita

(south)

Trailokyavijaya

(south-east)

=== The Ten Wisdom Kings ===
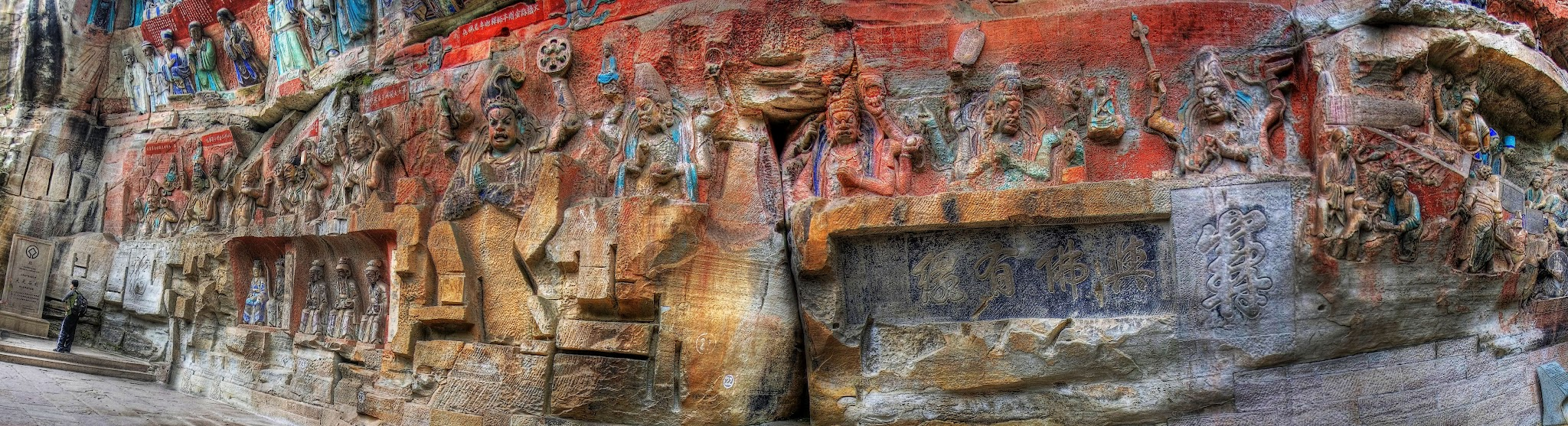
Panorama of a short segment of the carvings, showing Song dynasty (960-1279) sculptures of the Ten Wisdom Kings at the Dazu Rock Carvings in Dazu District, Chongqing, China.

The more common grouping found in Chinese Buddhism is the Ten Great Wisdom Kings (十大明王; Shídà Míngwáng). Several groupings of the Ten Kings exist based on different canonical scriptural sources, each of which differ slightly in the naming of certain vidyārājas and attributing certain Kings to different Buddhas and bodhisattvas. Some examples of acknowledged canonical sources for the grouping of the Ten Wisdom Kings are The Sūtra of the Liturgy for Brilliant Contemplation of the Ten Wrathful Wisdom Kings of the Illusory Net of the Great Yoga Teachings (佛說幻化網大瑜伽教十忿怒明王大明觀想儀軌經; Fóshuō Huànhuàwǎng Dà Yújiājiào Shífènnù Míngwáng Dàmíng Guānxiǎng Yíguǐ Jīng) as well as The Sūtra with the Great Instructions that are Universal, Secret, and Unexcelled about the Contemplations of Mañjuśrī (妙吉祥平等秘密最 上觀門大教王經; Miàojíxiáng Píngděng Mìmì Zuìshàng Guānmén Dàjiàowáng Jīng).

In contemporary Chinese Buddhist practice, the Ten Wisdom Kings are regularly invoked in ceremonies and rituals, such as the Shuilu Fahui ceremony, where they are provided offerings and entreated to expel evil from the ritual platform. In particular, ritual paintings of the Ten Wisdom Kings are arranged in a particular maṇḍala (壇; tán) during the Shuilu Fahui ceremony, with a particular direction associated with each Wisdom King. The Wisdom King Ucchuṣma (穢跡金剛明王; Huìjì Jīngāng Míngwáng; 'Vajra Being of Impure Traces'), a manifestation of Śakyamuni, is not counted among the Ten Wisdom Kings in the ceremony, but he is still invoked separately from the grouping in the same ritual and his image is typically enshrined ahead of the outer north direction of the maṇḍala of the Ten Wisdom Kings. The specific list of the Ten Wisdom Kings invoked during the Shuilu Fahui ceremony, along with their associated directions in the maṇḍala, is canonized in the ceremony's ritual manual (水陸儀軌會本; Shuǐlù Yíguǐ Huìběn) based on scriptural sources. They are as follows:

- Acala (不動明王; Bùdòng Míngwáng) - Manifestation of Sarvanivāraṇaviṣkambhin, associated with the east
- Trailokyavijaya (降三世明王; Xiángsānshì Míngwáng) - Manifestation of Vajrapāṇi, associated with the outer south
- Kuṇḍali (軍荼利明王; Jūntúlì Míngwáng) - Manifestation of Amitābha, associated with the inner north
- Yamāntaka (大威徳明王; Dàwēidé Míngwáng) - Manifestation of the Mañjuśrī, associated with the north-east
- Mahācakra (大輪明王; Dàlún Míngwáng) - Manifestation of Maitreya, associated with the outer north
- Padanakṣipa (步擲明王; Bùzhì Míngwáng) - Manifestation of Samantabhadra, associated with the south-west
- Aparājita (無能勝明王; Wúnéngshèng Míngwáng) - Manifestation of Kṣitigarbha, associated with the inner south
- Hayagrīva (馬頭明王; Mǎtóu Míngwáng) - Manifestation of Avalokiteśvara (Guanyin), associated with the west
- Vajrahāsa (大笑明王; Dàxiào Míngwáng) - Manifestation of Ākāśagarbha, associated with the south-east
- Mahābala (大力明王; Dàlì Míngwáng) - Manifestation of Śakyamuni, associated with the north-west

Mahācakra

(outer north)

Mahābala

(north-west)

Kuṇḍali

(inner north)

Yamāntaka

(north-east)

Hayagrīva

(west)

Acala

(east)

Padanakṣipa

(south-west)

Aparājita

(inner south)

Vajrahāsa

(south-east)

Trailokyavijaya

(outer south)

Ming dynasty mural of the Ten Wisdom Kings in Yong'an Temple<sup>[zh]</sup> in Hunyuan, Shanxi, China

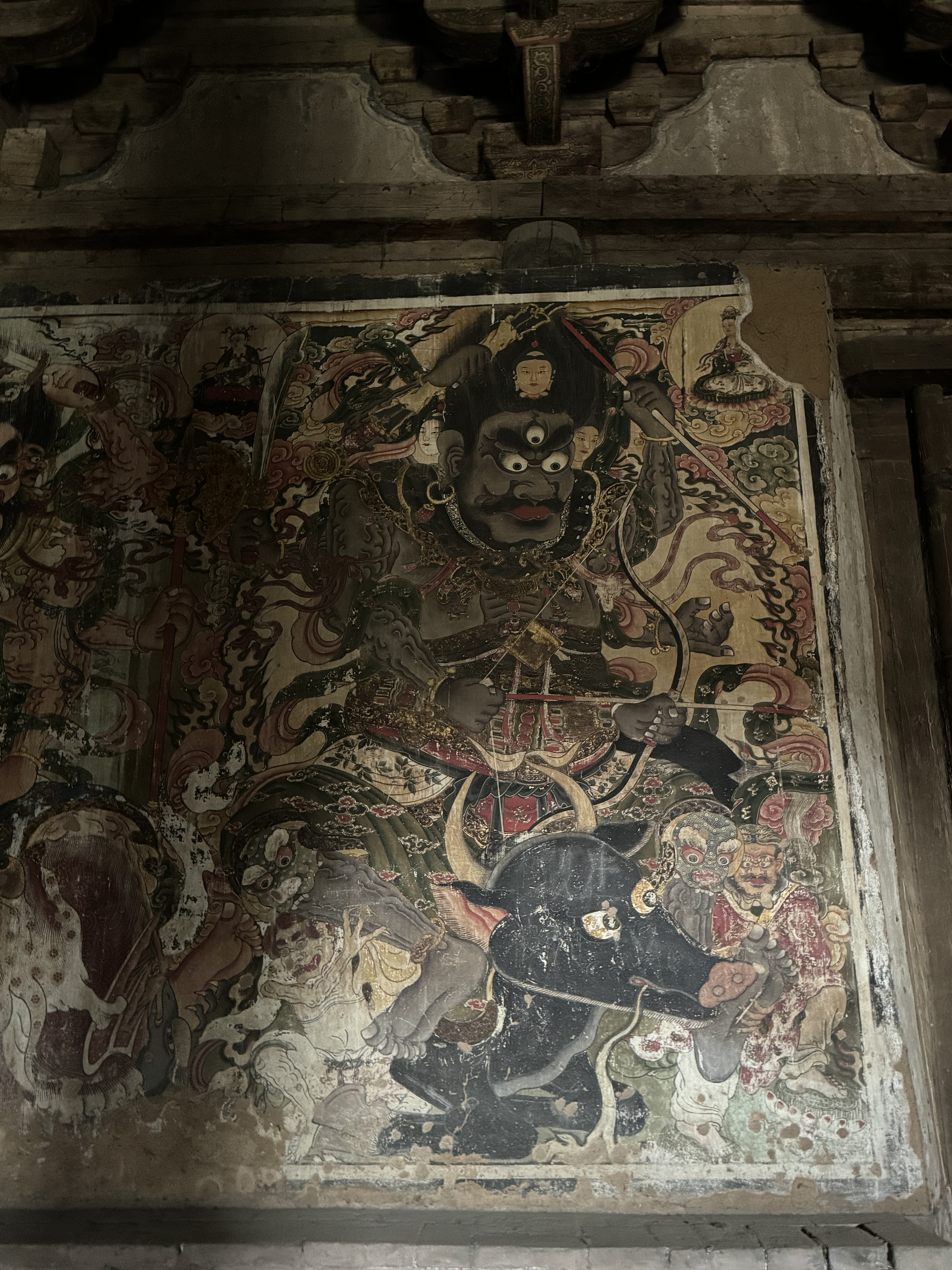
Mahābala (Dàlì Míngwáng)

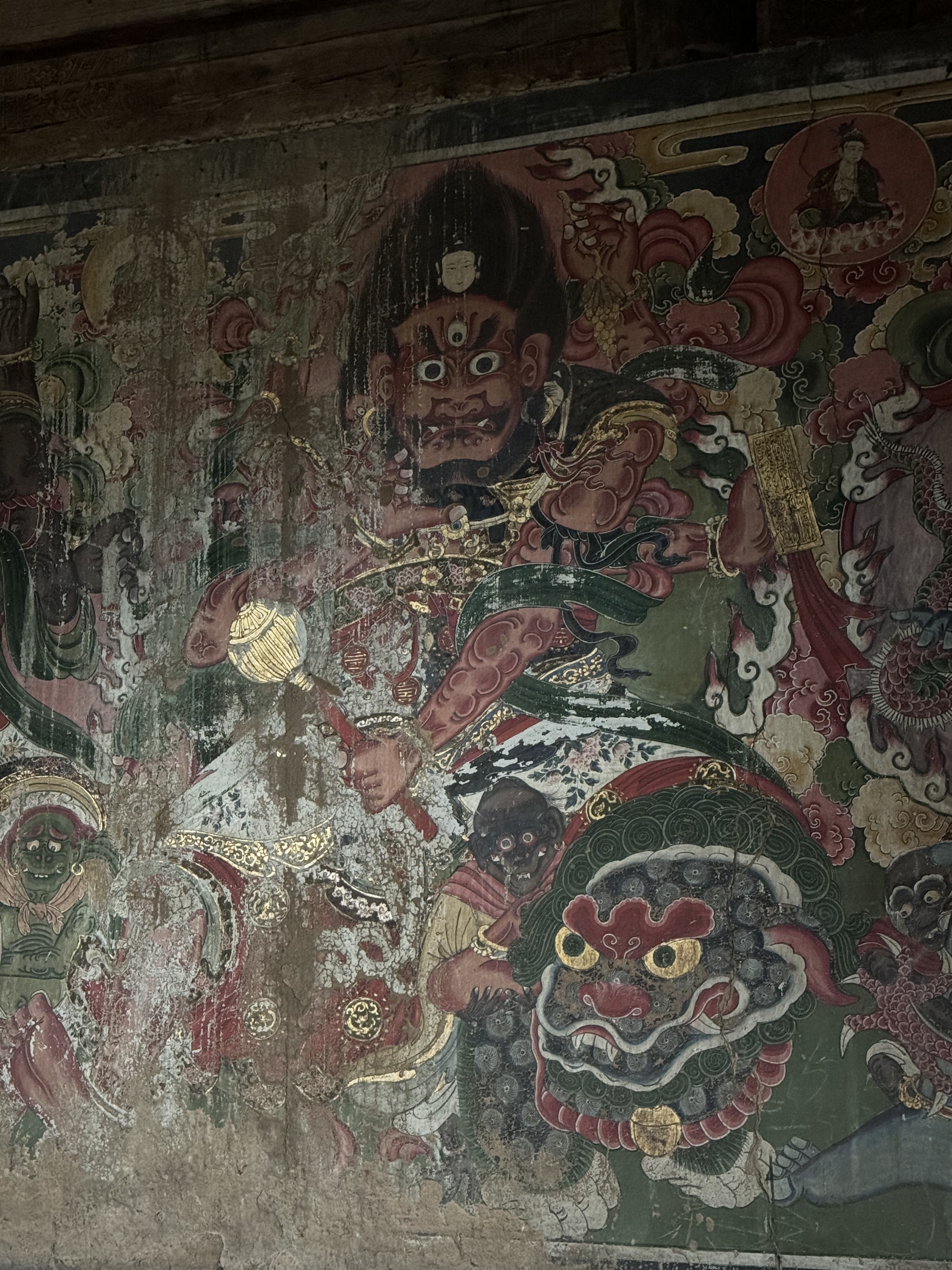
Hayagrīva (Mǎtóu Míngwáng)

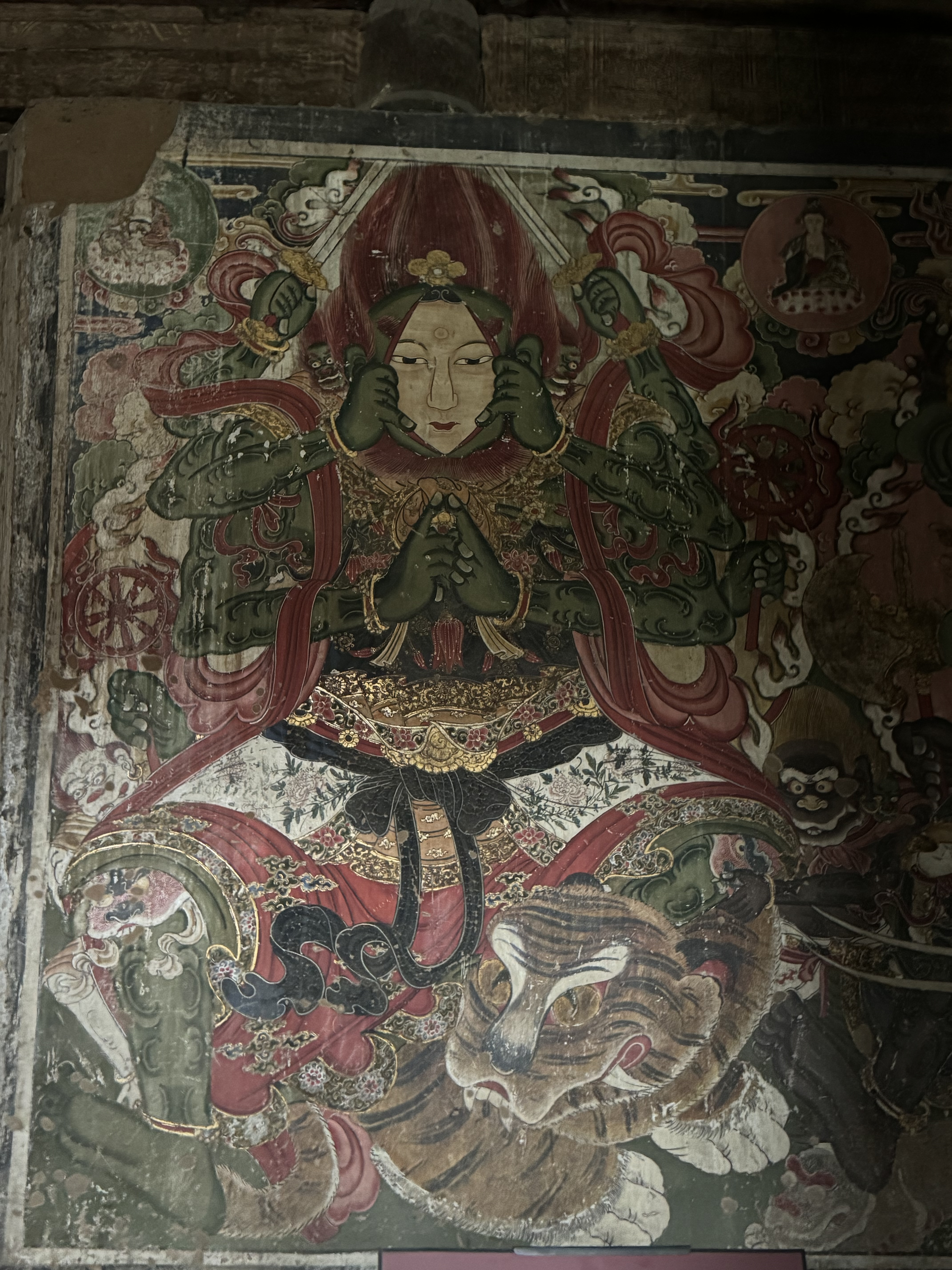
Acala (Bùdòng Míngwáng)

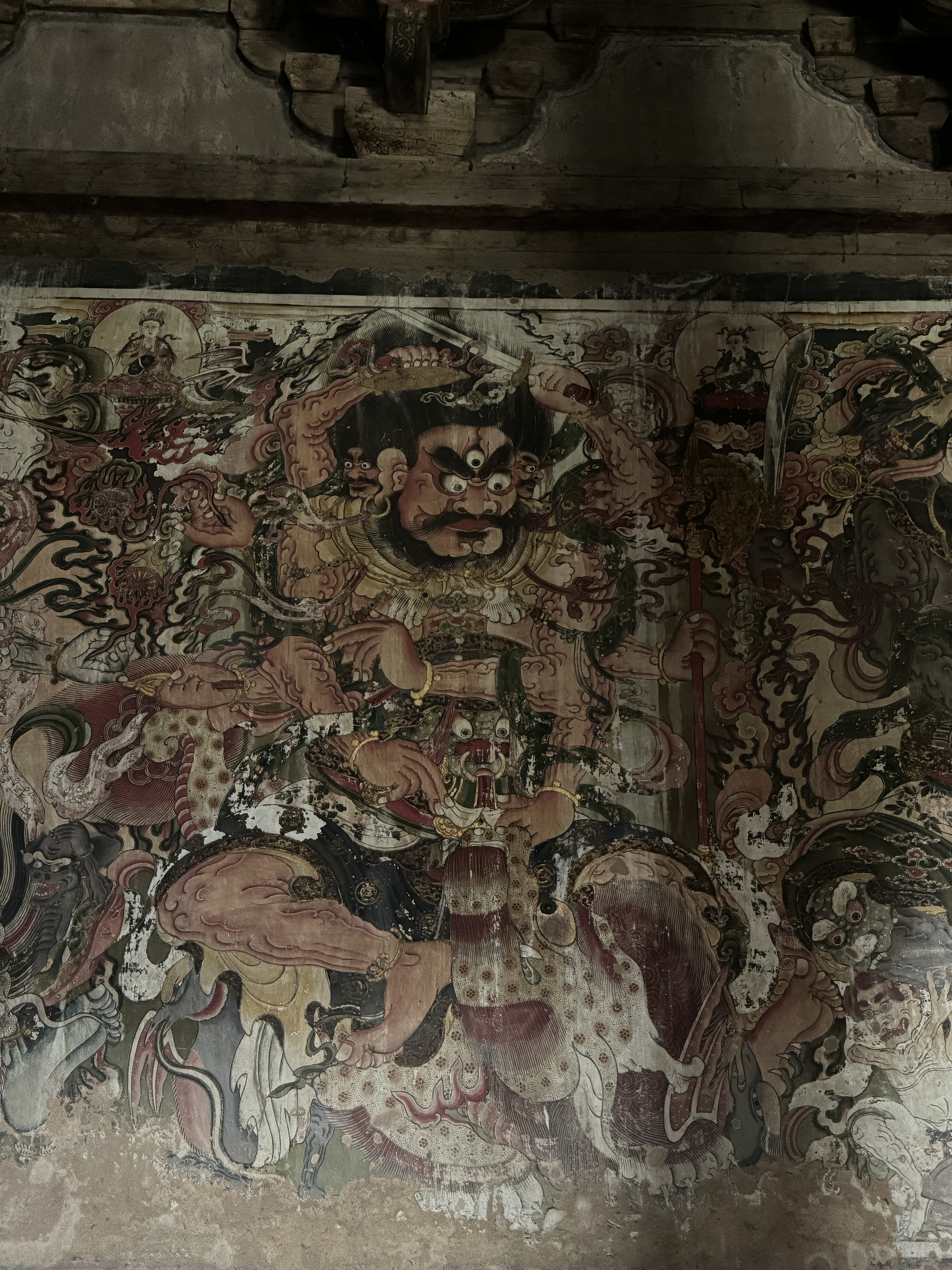
Aparajita (Wúnéngshēng Míngwáng)

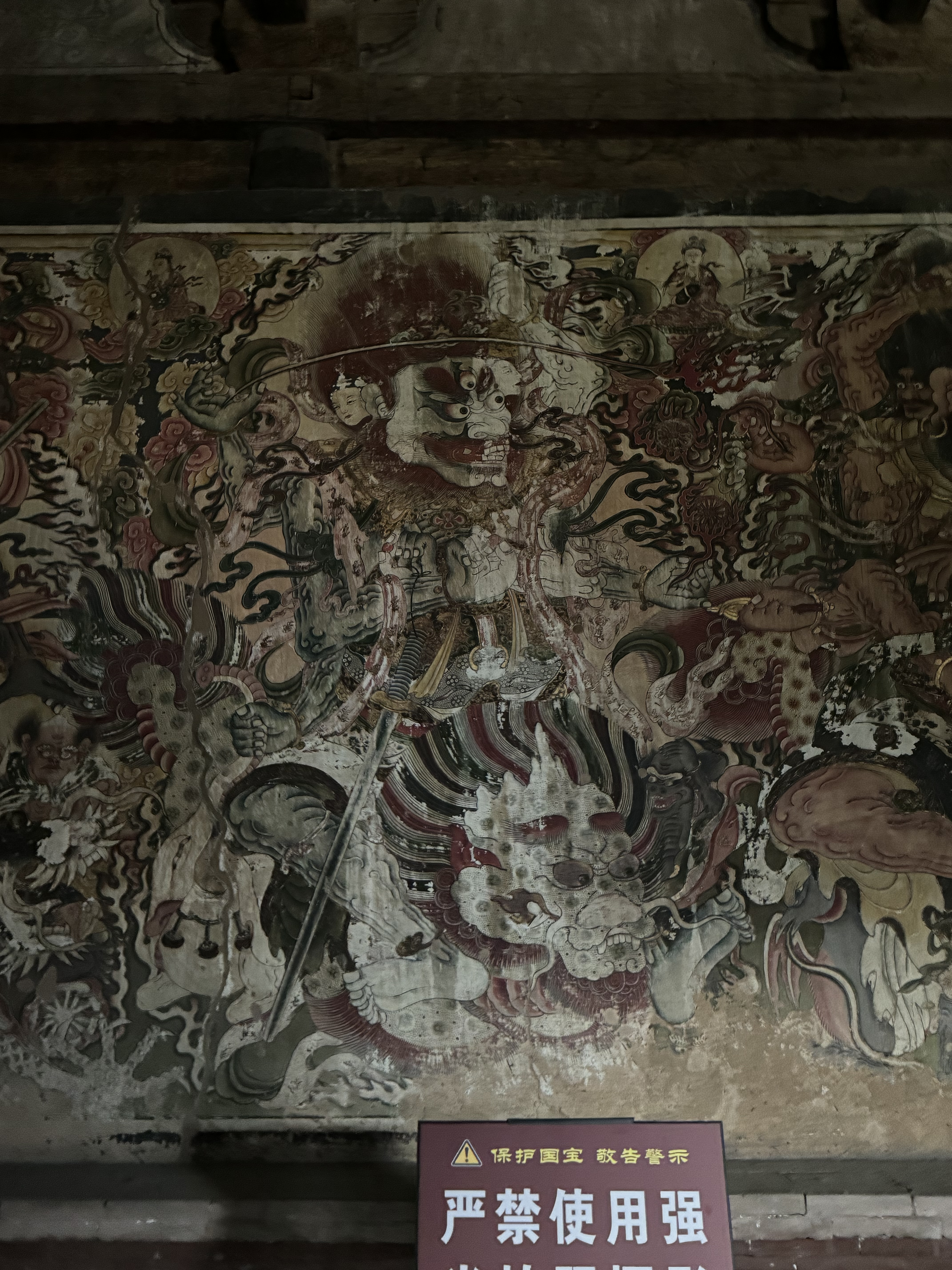
Yamāntaka (Dàwēidé Míngwáng)

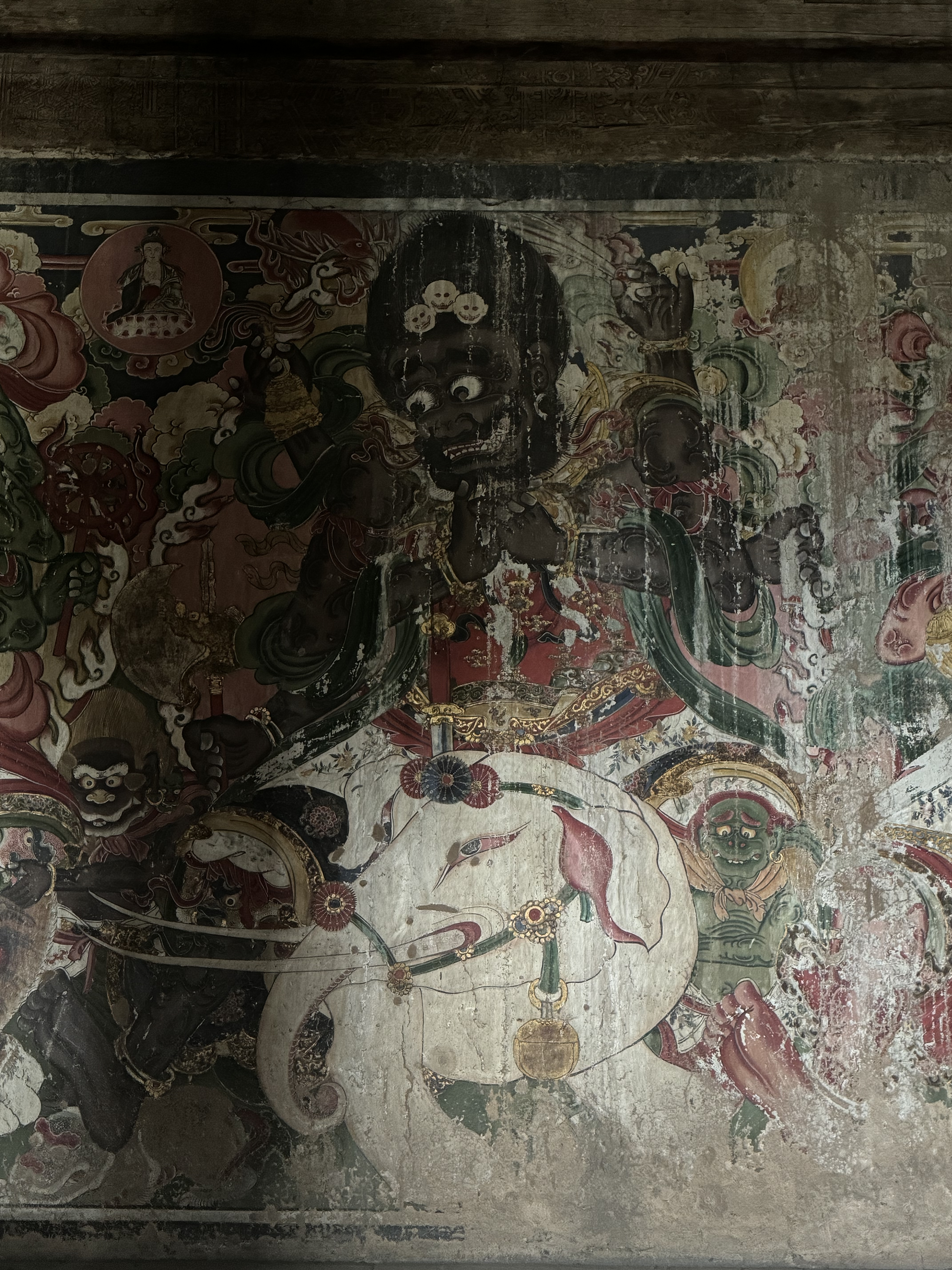
Padanaksipa (Bùzhì Míngwáng)

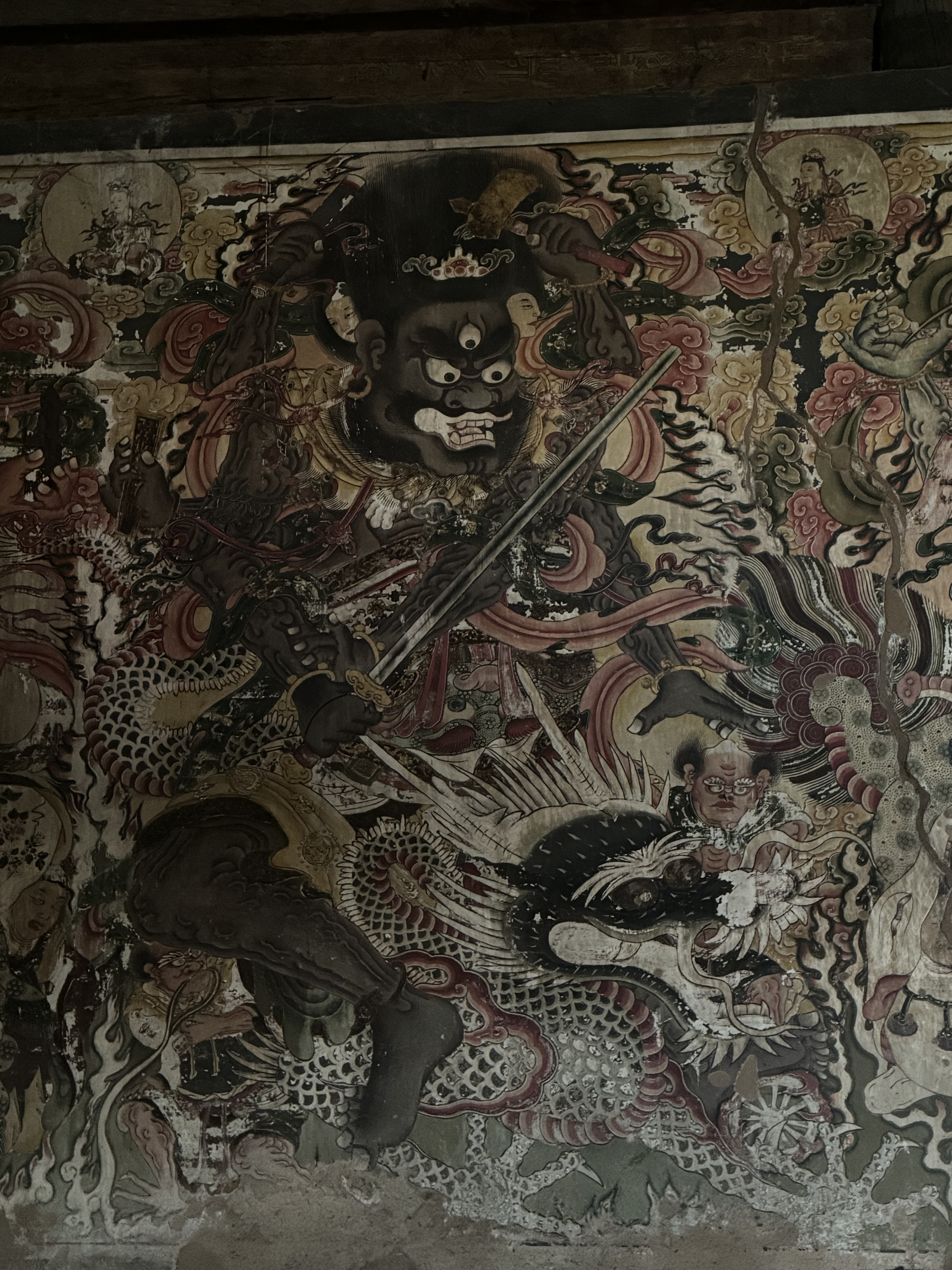
Vajrahāsa (Dàxiào Míngwáng)

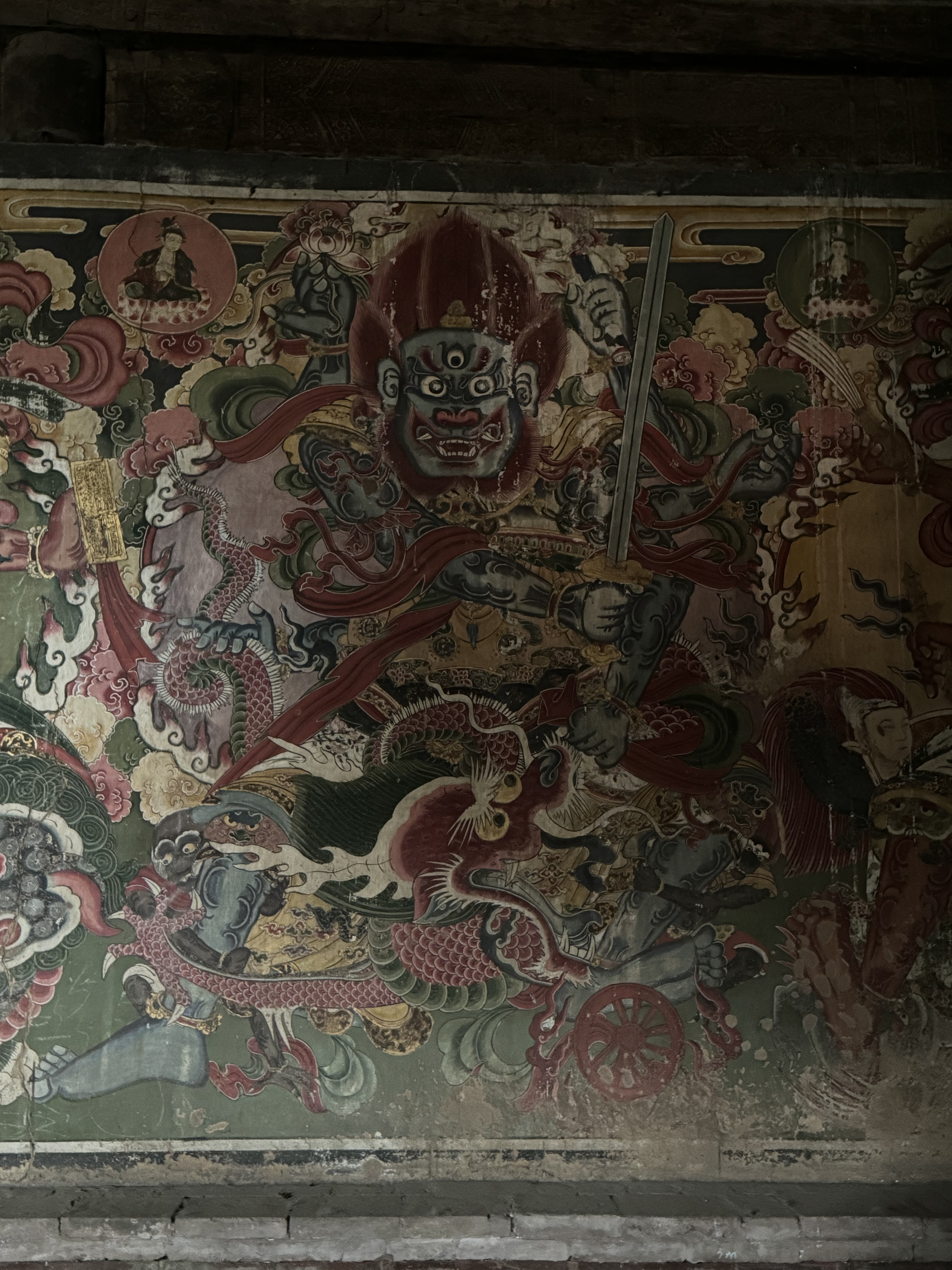
Trailokyavijaya (Xiángsānshì Míngwáng)

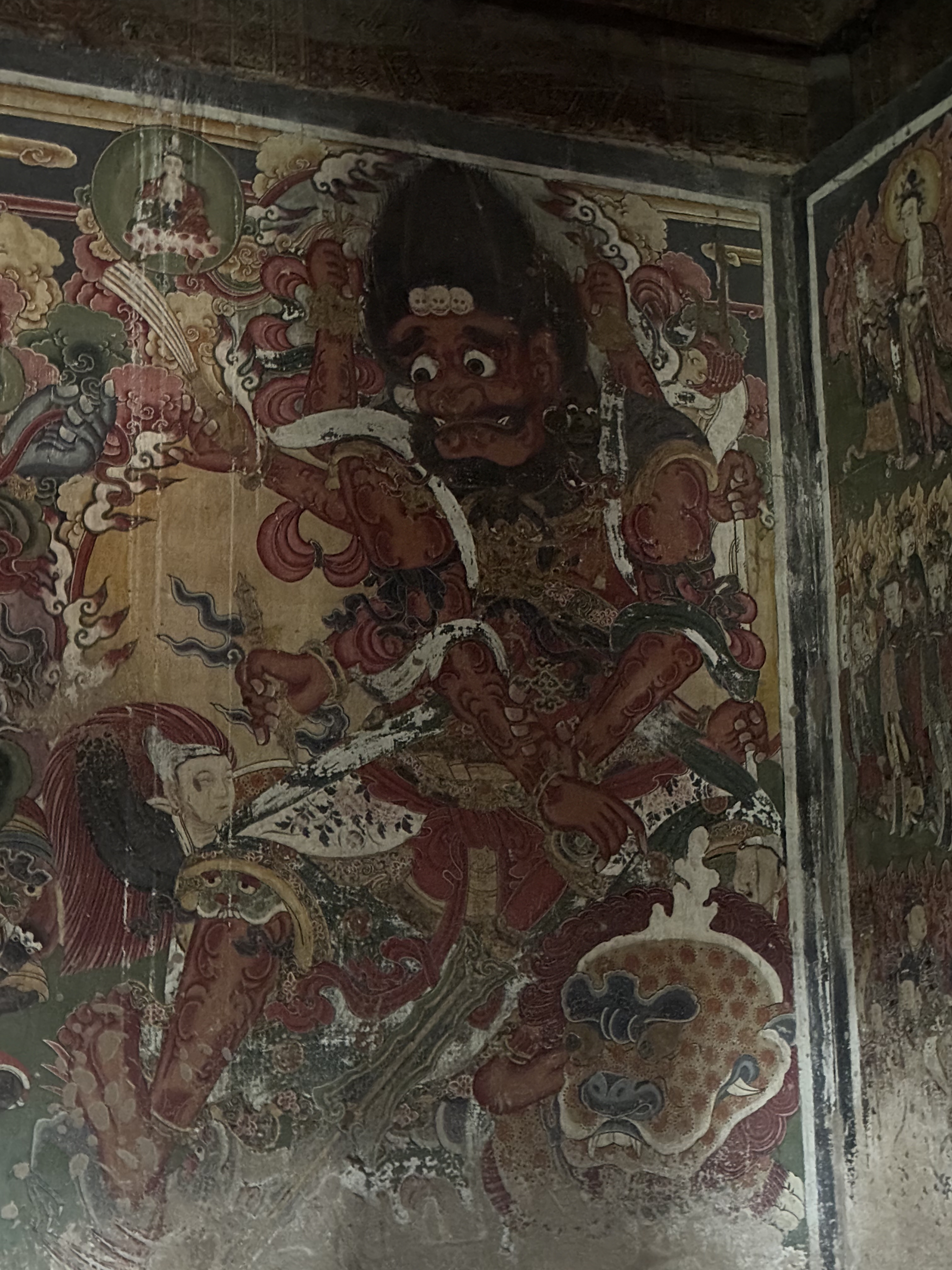
Kuṇḍali (Jūntúlì Míngwáng)

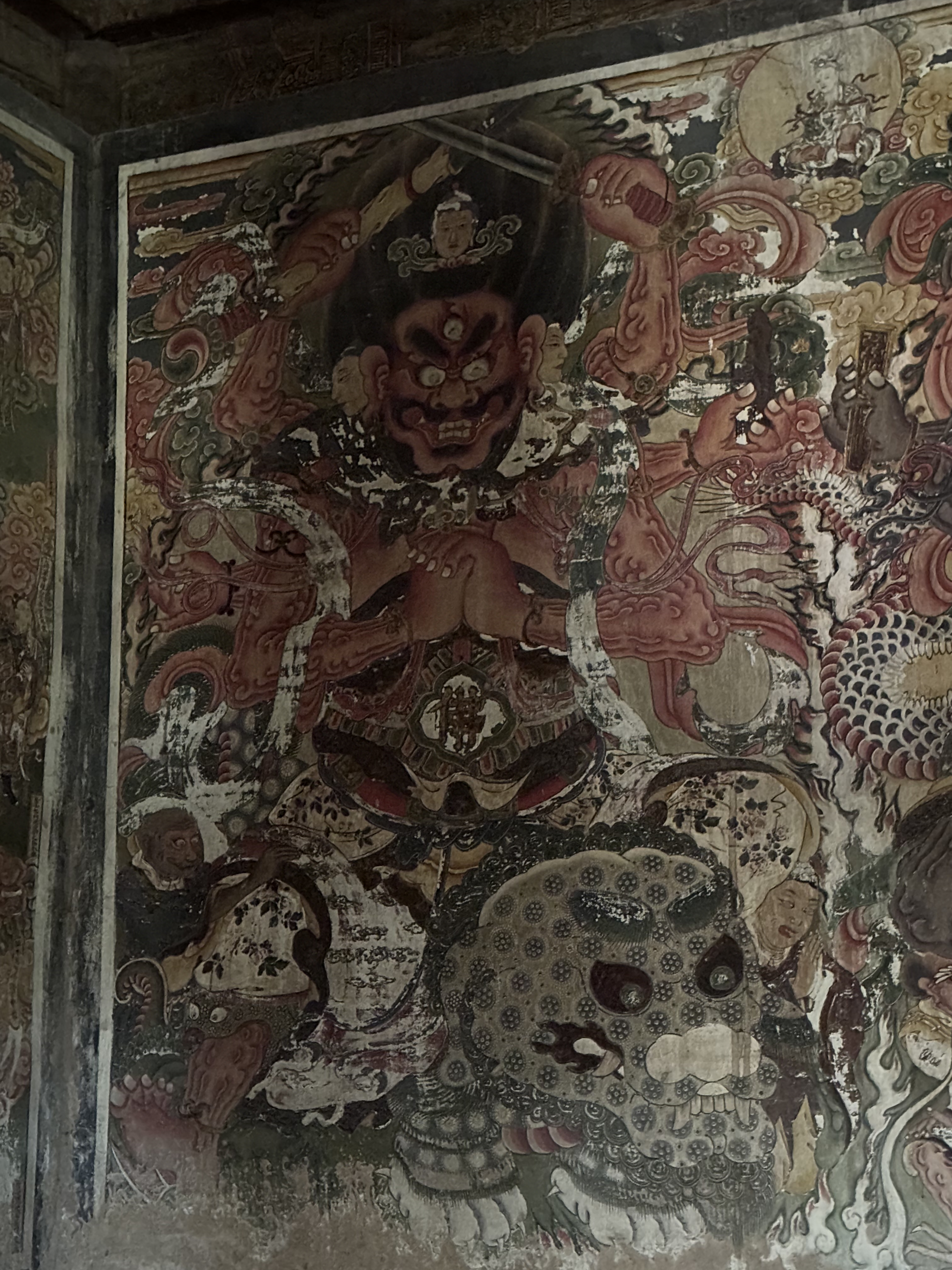
Mahācakra (Dàlún Míngwáng)

=== Others ===
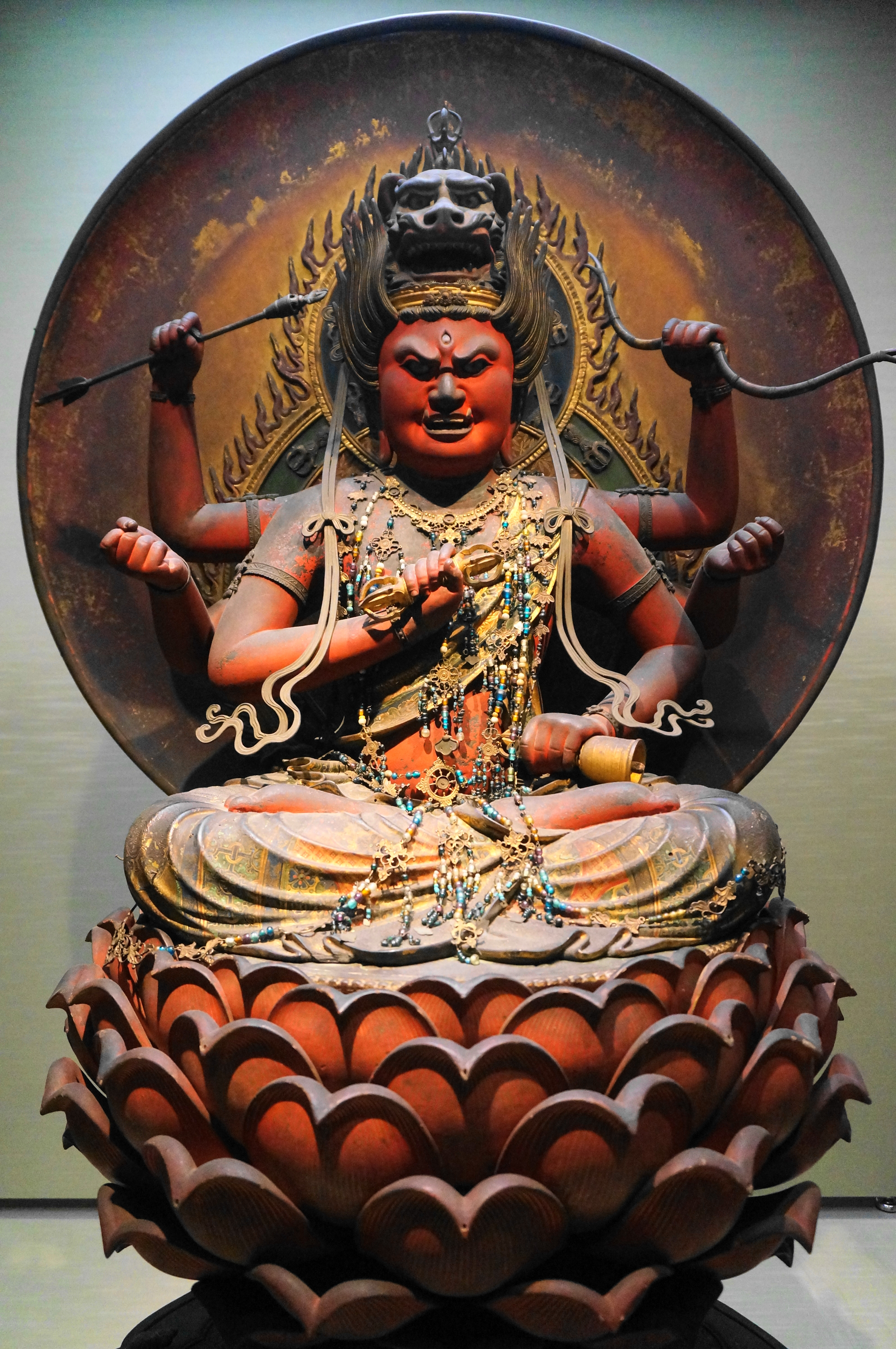
Rāgarāja (Aizen Myōō), 13th century, Japan. Important Cultural Property.

Other deities to whom the title vidyārāja is applied include:

- Rāgarāja (Chinese: 愛染明王; pinyin: Àirǎn Míngwáng; Japanese pronunciation: Aizen Myōō) - A vidyaraja considered to transform worldly lust and sexual passion into pathways to spiritual awakening; manifestation of the bodhisattva Vajrasattva and/or the buddha Vairochana.
- Āṭavaka (Chinese: 大元帥明王; pinyin: Dàyuánshuài Míngwáng; Japanese pronunciation: Daigensui Myōō or 大元明王, Daigen Myōō) - A yaksha attendant of the deva Vaishravana.
- Mahāmāyūrī (Chinese: 孔雀明王; pinyin: Kǒngquè Míngwáng; Japanese pronunciation: Kujaku Myōō) - A Wisdom Queen (vidyārājñī); sometimes also classified as a bodhisattva. Unlike most other vidyārājas, s/he is depicted with a benevolent expression.
- Mahākrodharāja (Chinese: 大可畏明王; pinyin: Dàkěwèi Míngwáng; Japanese pronunciation: Daikai Myōō) - Attendant or manifestation of Amoghapasha (Chinese: 不空羂索観音; pinyin: Bùkōng Juànsuǒ Guānyīn; Japanese pronunciation: Fukū Kensaku/Kenjaku Kannon), one of Avalokiteshvara's forms.
- Sadākṣara (Chinese: 六字明王; pinyin: Liùzì Míngwáng; Japanese pronunciation: Rokuji Myōō) - A deification of the Sadākṣara (Six-Letter) Sutra Ritual (Japanese: 六字経法; rōmaji: Rokuji-kyō hō), a rite of subjugation focused on the six manifestations of Avalokiteshvara. Unlike other Wisdom Kings but like Mahamayuri, he sports a gentle bodhisattva-like countenance and is shown with four or six arms and standing on one leg.

== Examples ==
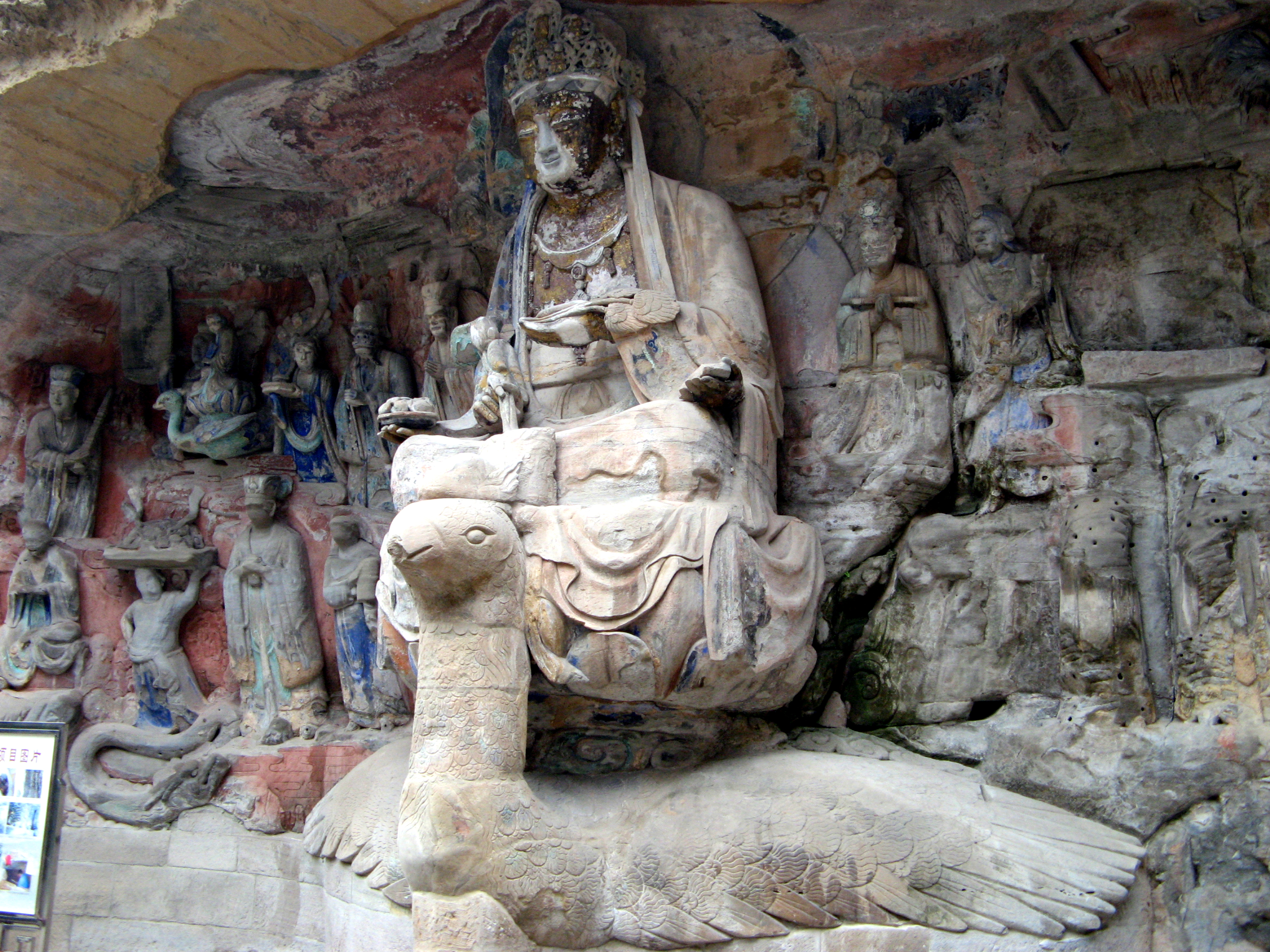
Song dynasty (960–1279) statue of the Wisdom Queen Mahāmāyūrī surrounded by various devas, part of the Dazu Rock Carvings at Chongqing, China.

Examples of depictions of the Eight Wisdom Kings can be found at:

- Cliff reliefs and rock carvings at Shizhongshan Grottoes^{[zh]} in Jianchuan, Yunnan
- Statues in the Datong Guanyin-tang^{[zh]} in Datong, Shanxi
- Frescos in the pagoda at Jueshan Temple^{[zh]} in Lingqiu, Shanxi

Examples of depictions of the Ten Wisdom Kings can be found at:

- Rock carvings at the Dazu Rock Carving sites in Dazu, Chongqing
- Statues in Shuanglin Temple near Pingyao, Shanxi
- Statues in Shuilu Nunnery^{[zh]} in Lantian, Xi'an
- Frescos in Qinglong Temple in Jishan, Shanxi
- Frescos in Yong'an Temple^{[zh]} in Hunyuan, Shanxi
- Frescos in Yunlin Temple^{[zh]} in Yanggao, Shanxi
- Frescos in Pilu Temple^{[zh]} in Shijiazhuang, Hebei
- Frescos in Dayun Temple^{[zh]} in Hunyuan, Shanxi
- Shuilu ritual paintings from various temples, such as Baoning Temple^{[zh]} in Youyu, Shanxi (Currently kept in the Shanxi Museum)
- Documents and carvings from the Mogao Caves near Dunhuang, Gansu

== Gallery ==
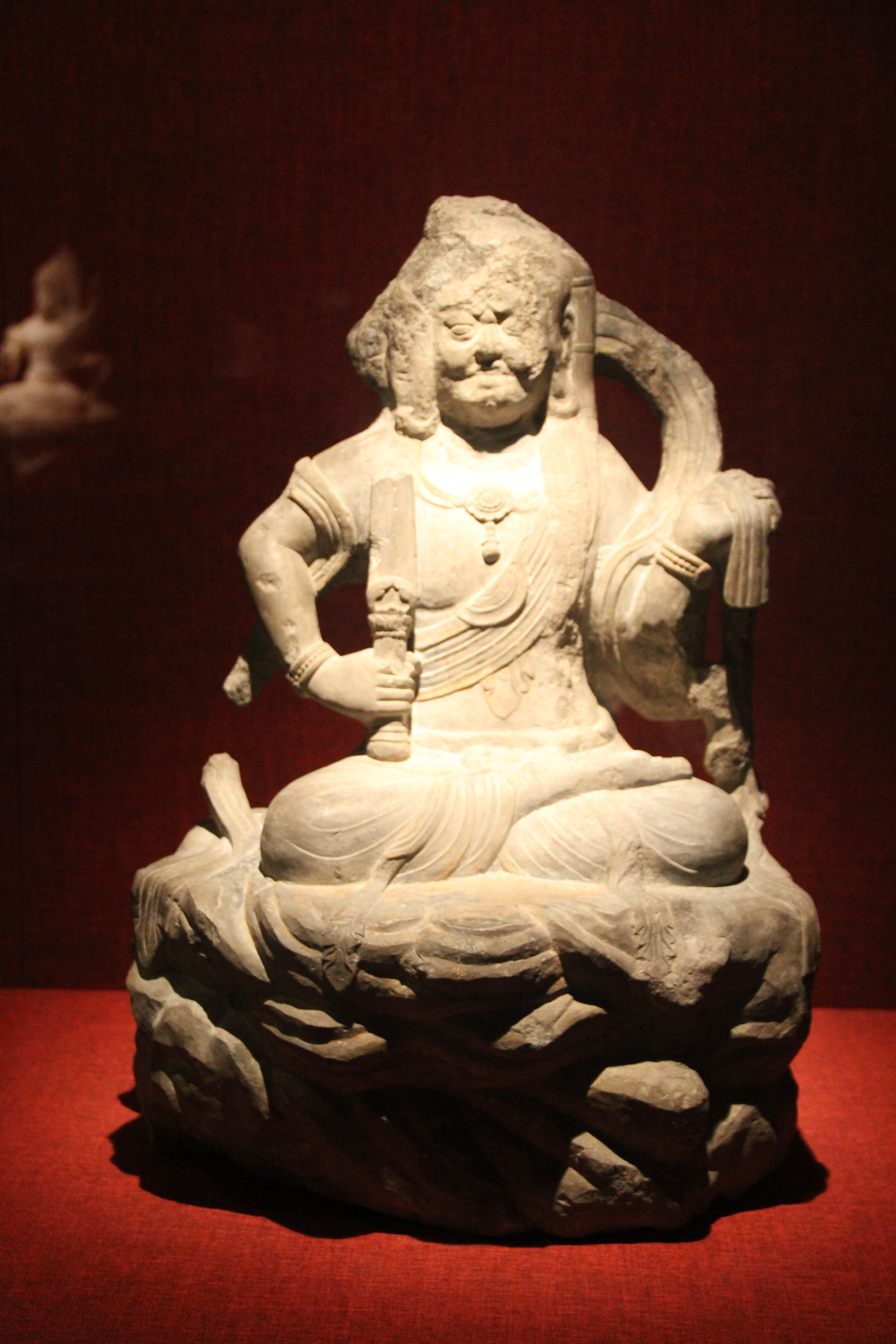
Tang dynasty statue of Acala, now kept at the Forest of Steles, Beilin Stone Museum in Xi'an, Shaanxi Province, China

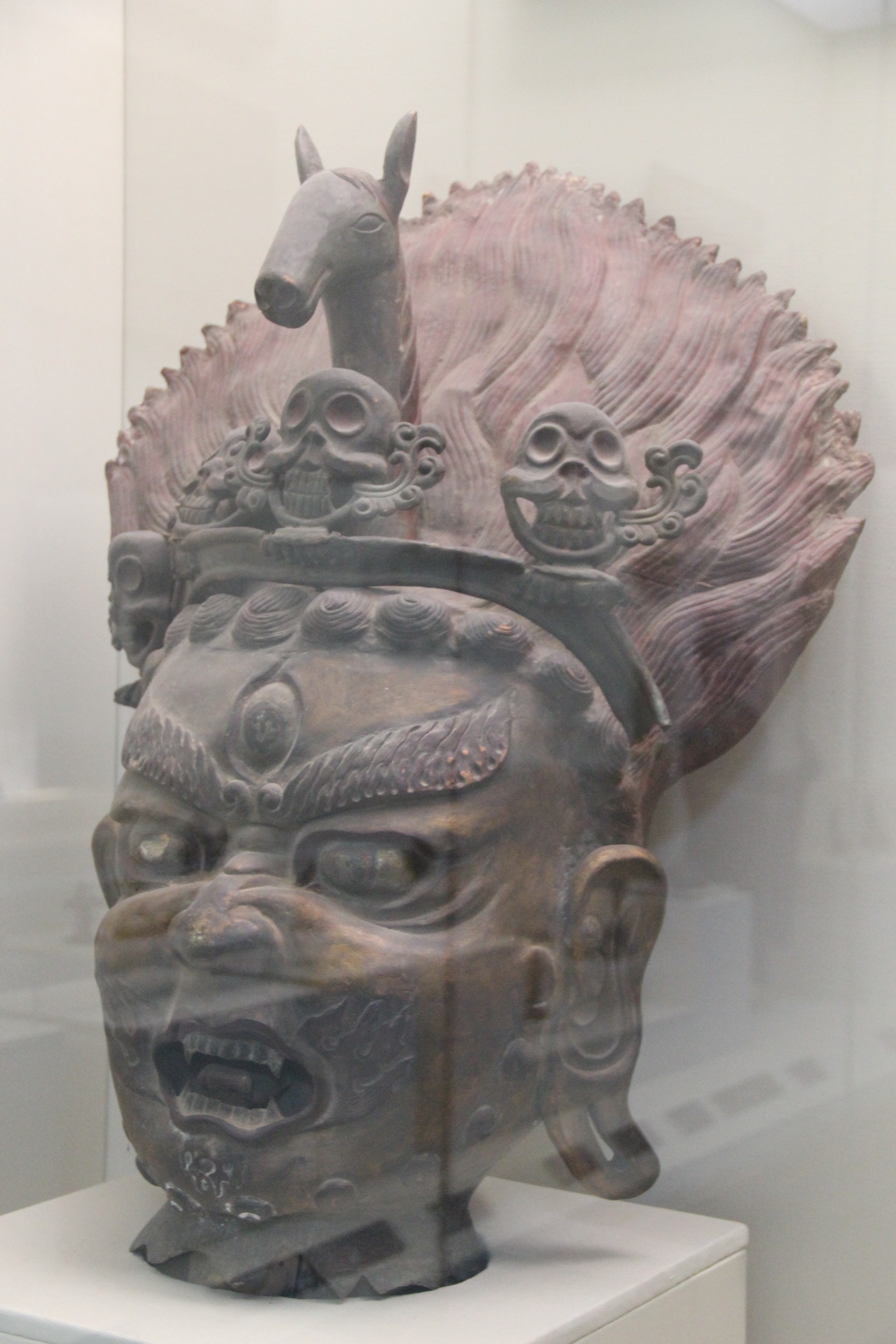
Head of a Qing dynasty statue of Hayagrīva, now held in the Gansu Provincial Museum, Lanzhou, Gansu, China

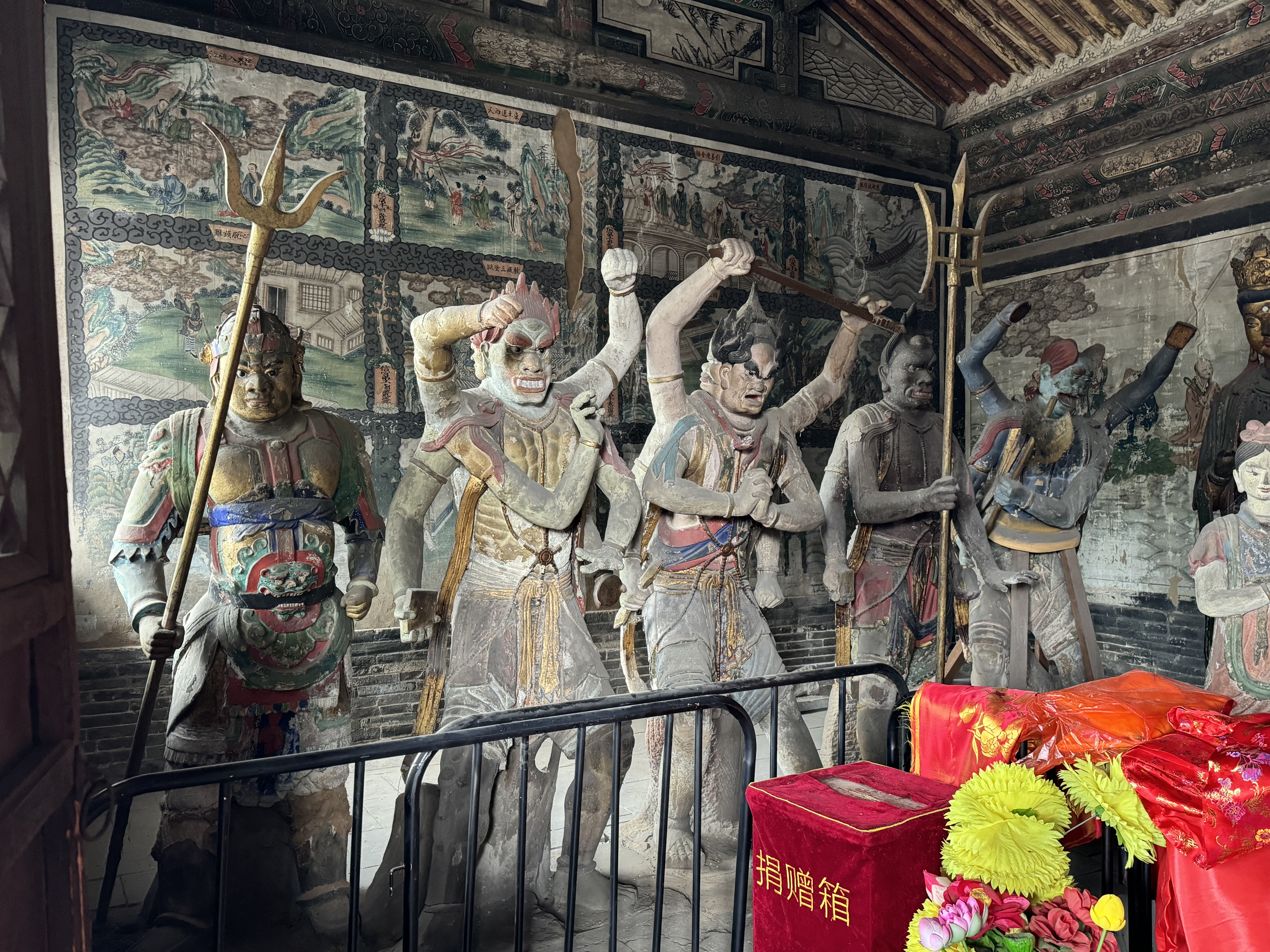
Liao dynasty (916–1125) statutes of four of the Eight Wisdom Kings and an attendant warrior at Datong Guanyin-tang^{[zh]}, Datong, Shanxi, China. From left to right: Padanakṣipa, Acala, Yamāntaka, Aparājita

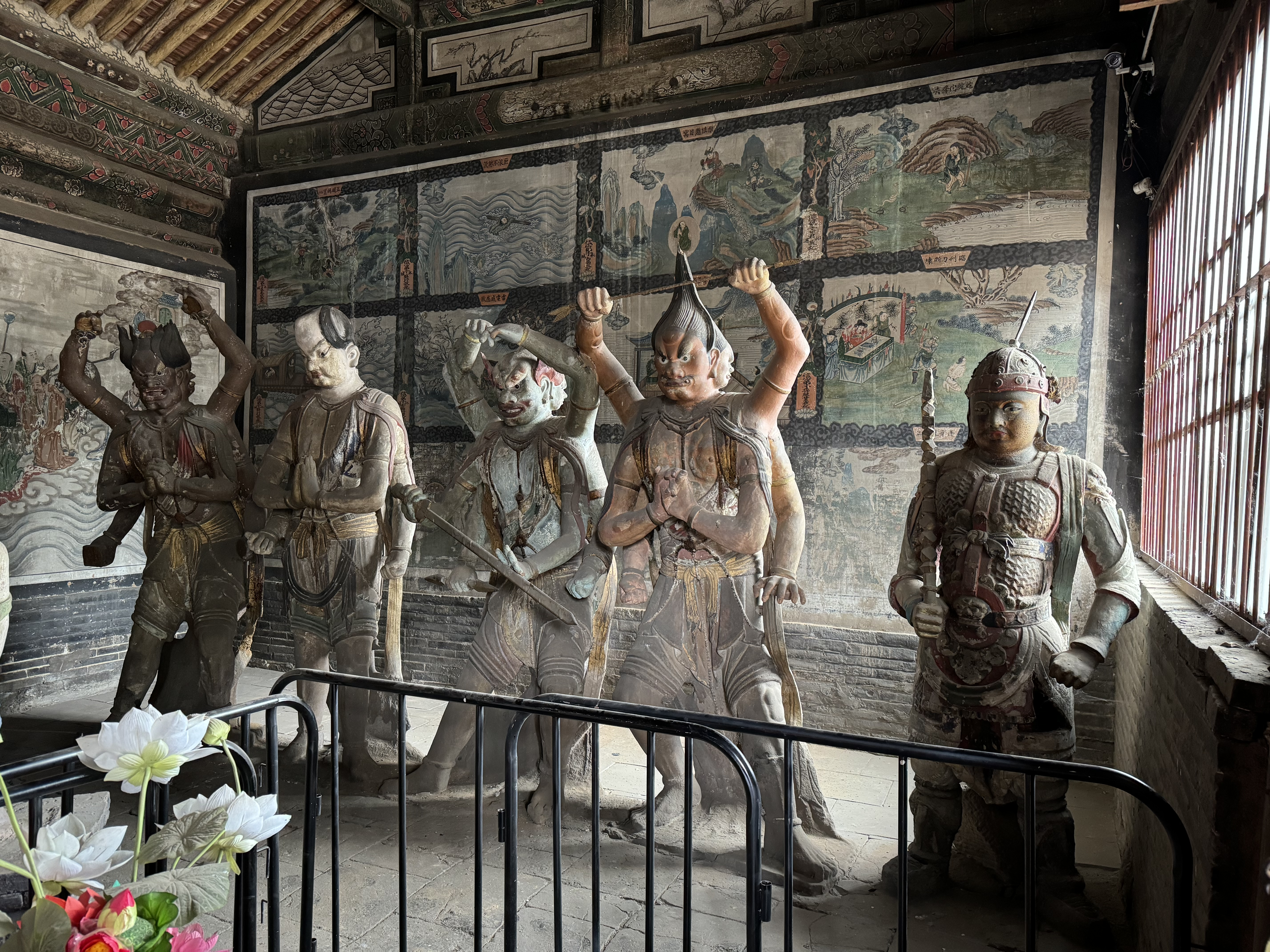
Liao dynasty (916–1125) statutes of four of the Eight Wisdom Kings and an attendant warrior at Datong Guanyin-tang^{[zh]}, Datong, Shanxi, China. From left to right: Hayagrīva, Vajrahāsa, Mahācakra, Mahāmāyūrī

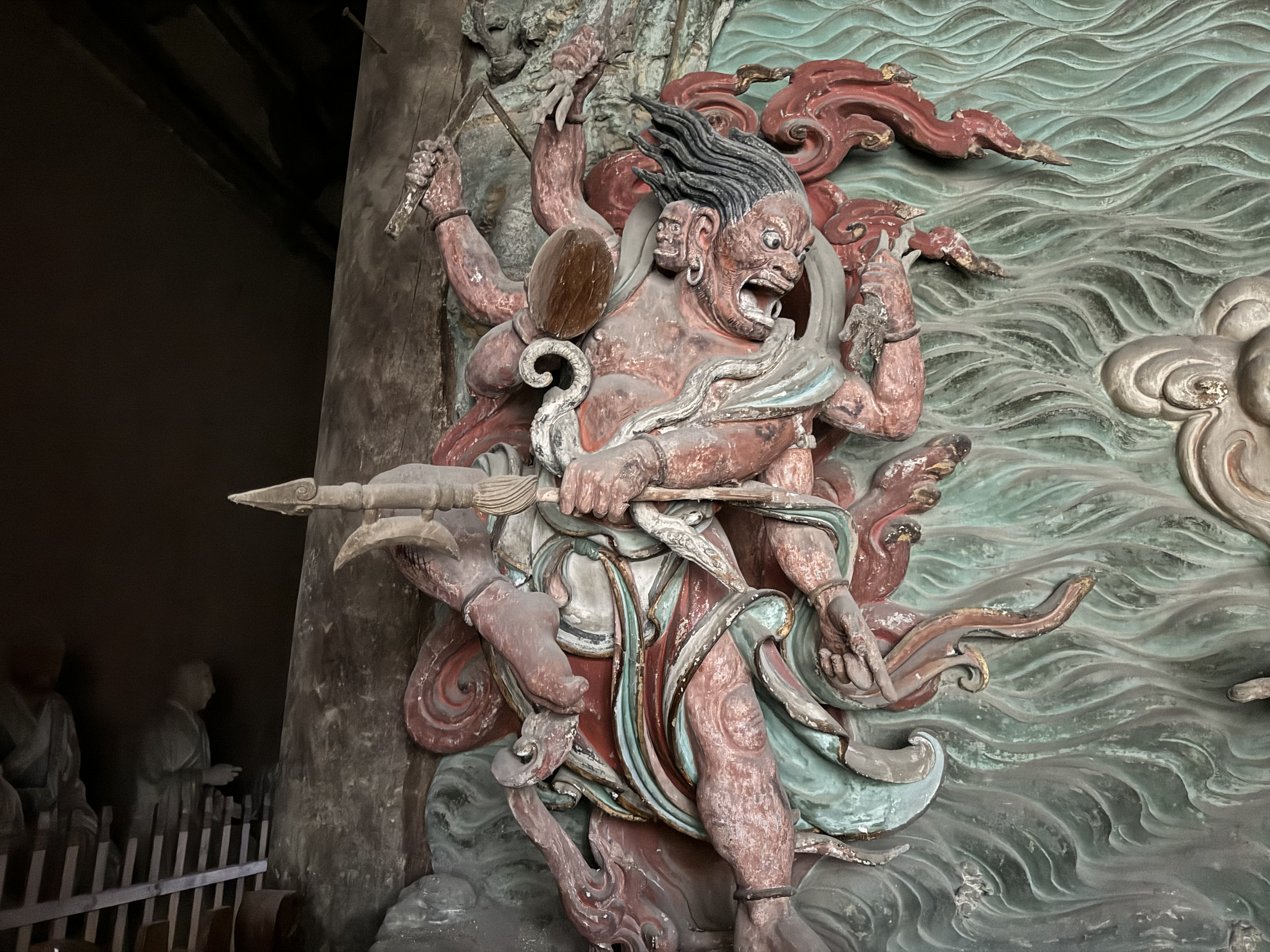
Yuan dynasty (1271–1368) figure of a Wisdom King, one out of a pair flanking a central figure of Guanyin, at Fusheng Temple^{[zh]} in Yuncheng, Shanxi, China

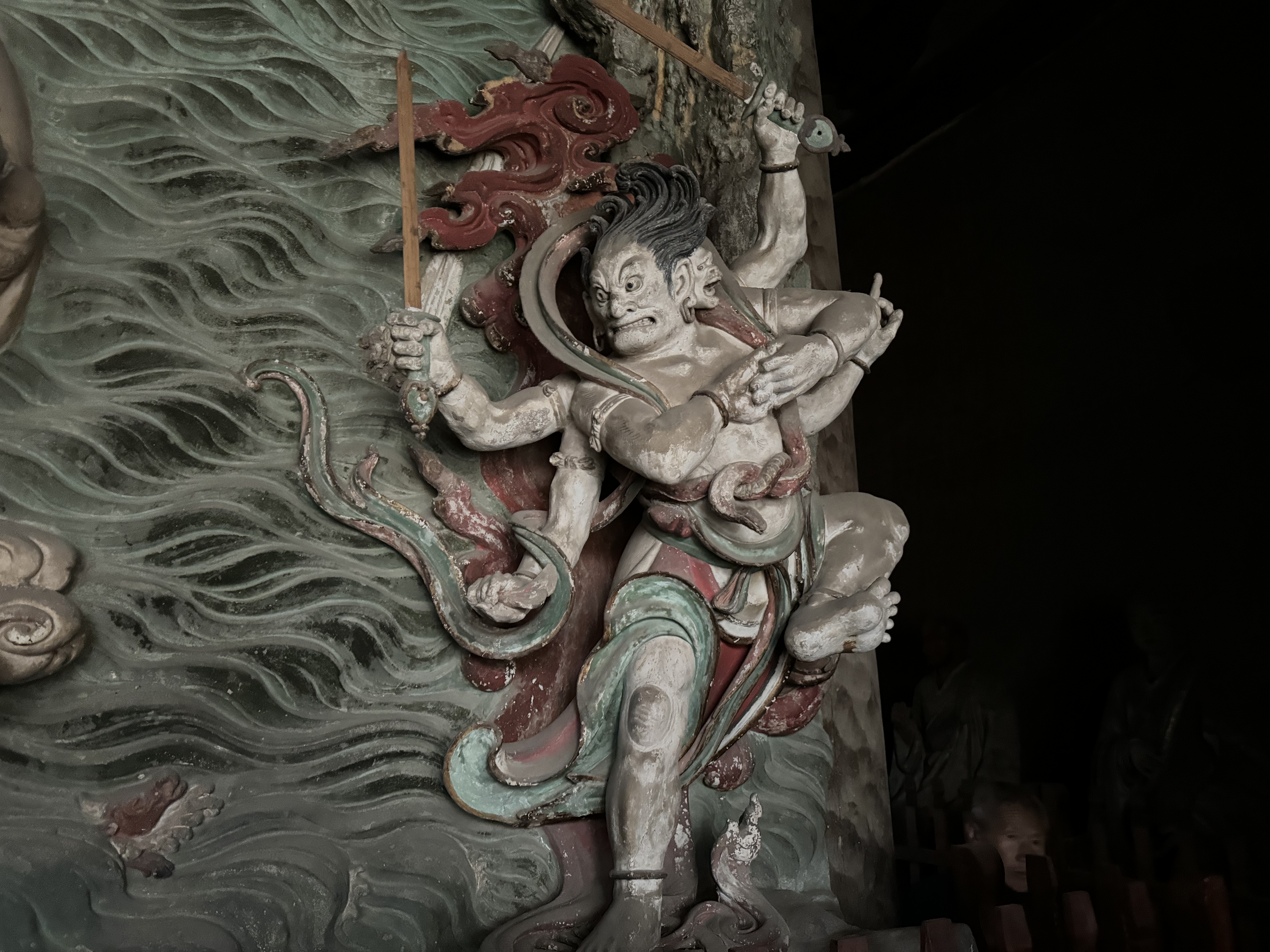
Yuan dynasty (1271–1368) figure of a Wisdom King, one out of a pair flanking a central figure of Guanyin, at Fusheng Temple^{[zh]} in Yuncheng, Shanxi, China

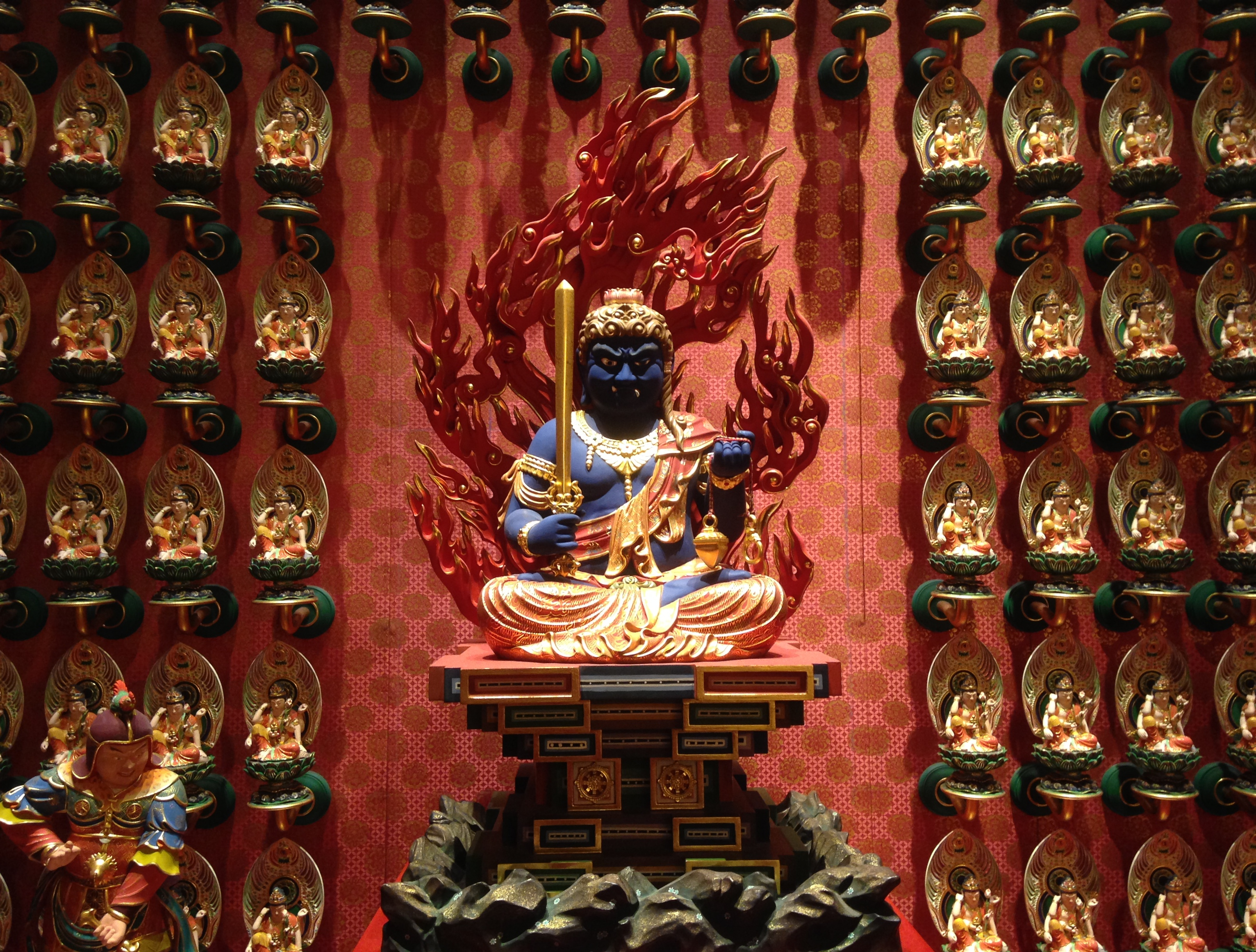
Acala at the Buddha Tooth Relic Temple and Museum (Chinatown, Singapore)

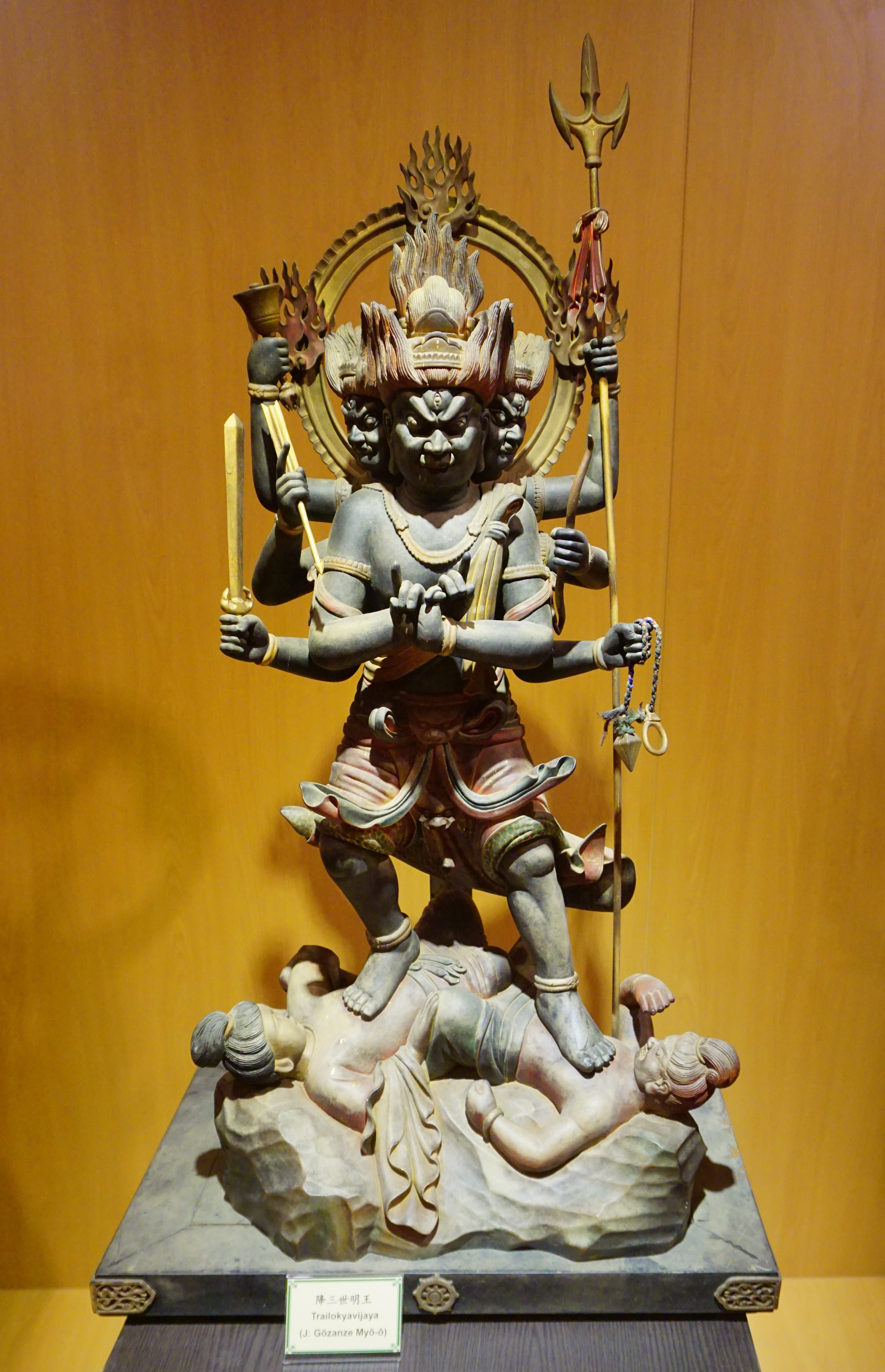
Trailokyavijaya in the Buddhist relic collection at the Buddha Tooth Relic Temple and Museum (Chinatown, Singapore)

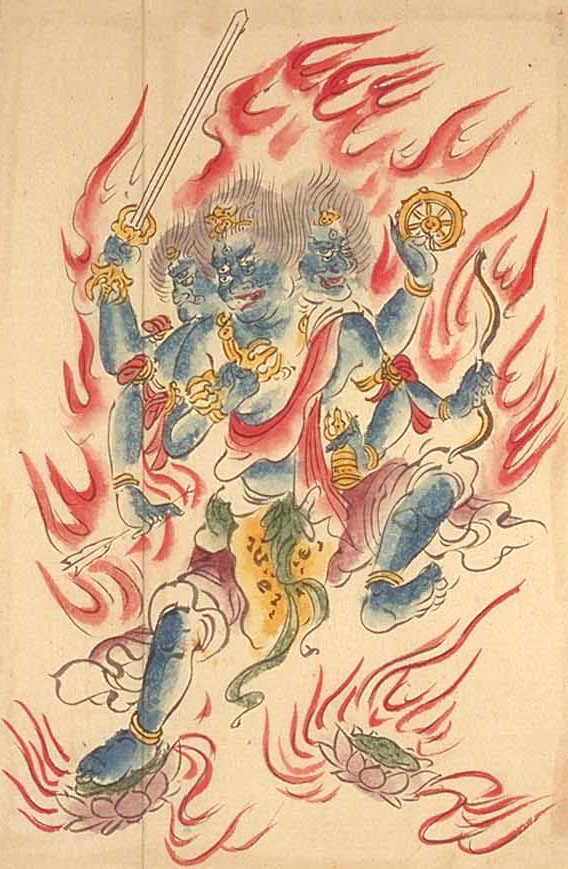
Vajrayakṣa

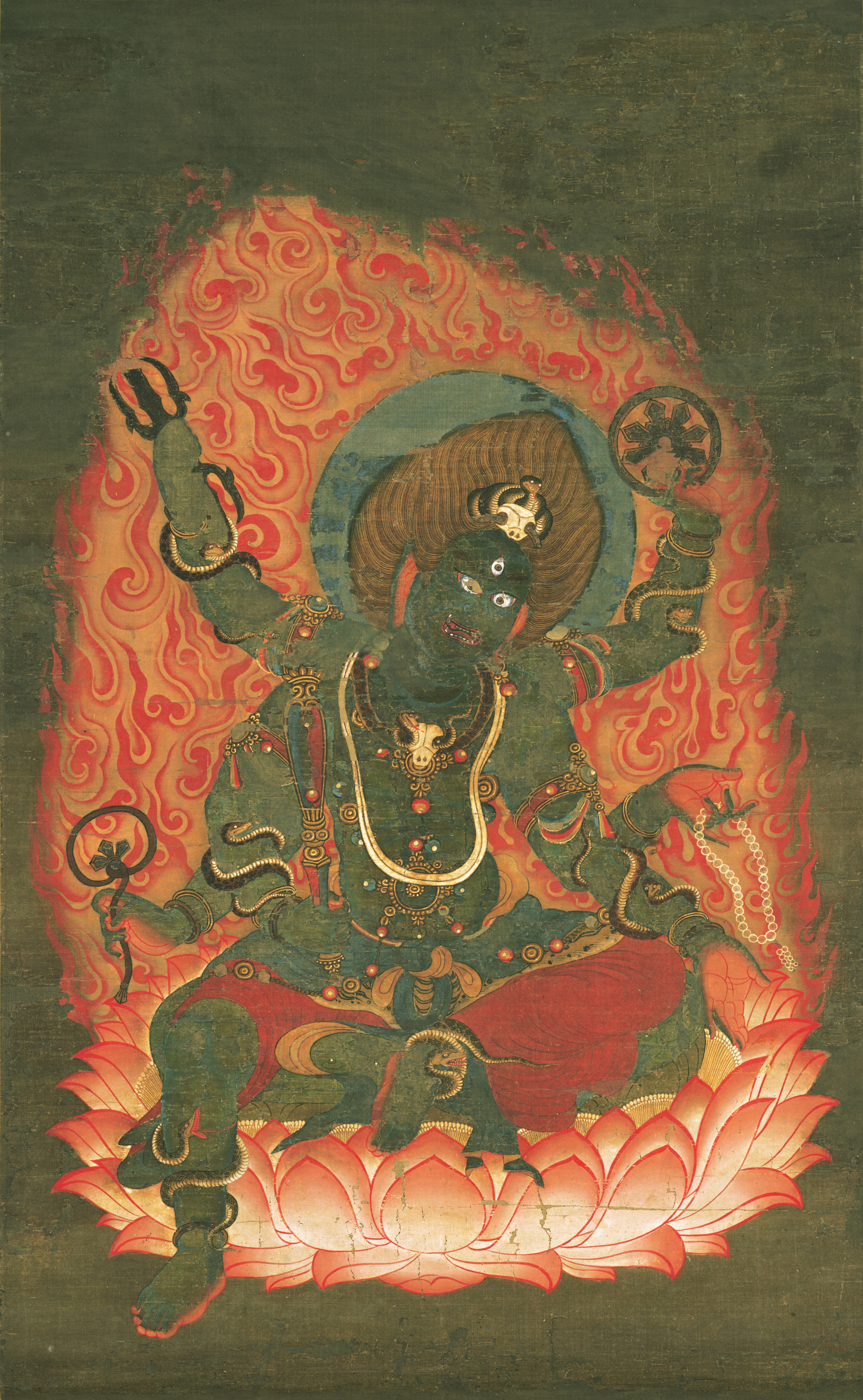
Heian period painting of Ucchuṣma at the Kyoto National Museum

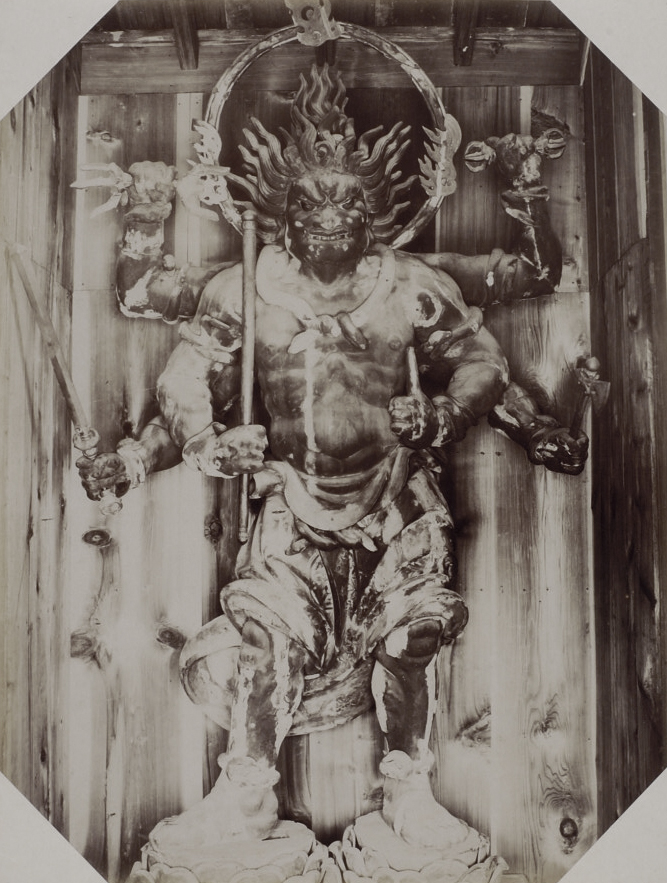
Statue of Āṭavaka at Akishino-dera, Nara, Japan

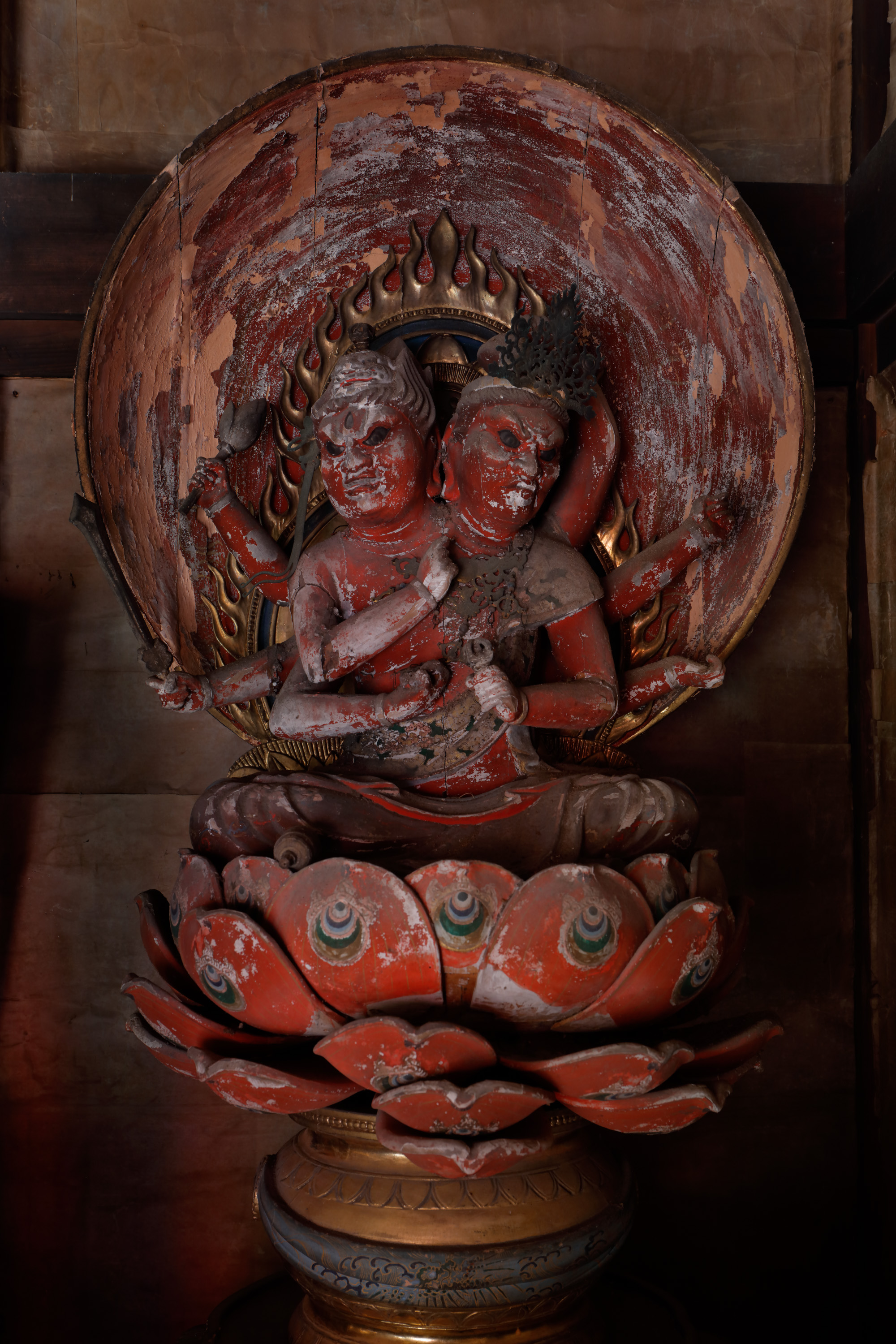
Statue of Two-Headed Rāgarāja, the combined form of Acala and Rāgarāja, at Hokke-ji (Mitahora Kōbō) in Gifu, Japan

== See also ==
- Dharmapāla and Lokapāla, guardian deities
- Zaō Gongen
