= Ucchusma =

Vidyārāja in Mahayana and Vajrayana Buddhism

Ucchuṣma
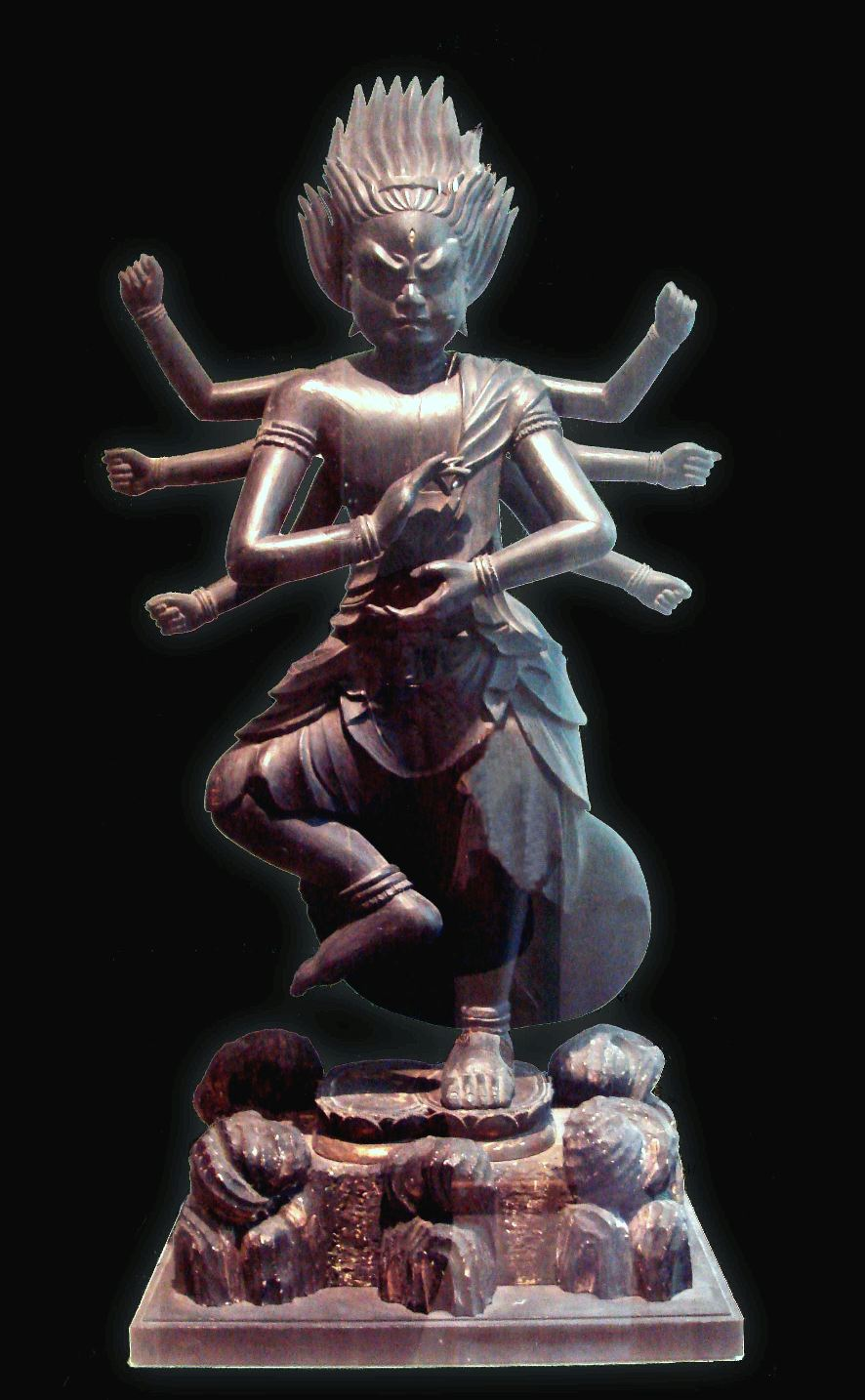
- The Wisdom King Ucchuṣma
- Sanskrit: उच्छुष्म (IAST: Ucchuṣma)
- Chinese: 烏樞沙摩 (Pinyin: Wūshūshāmó) 穢跡金剛 (Pinyin: Huìjì Jīngāng) 火頭金剛 (Pinyin: Huǒtóu Jīngāng), etc.
- Japanese: 烏枢沙摩明王(うすさまみょうおう), 烏芻沙摩明王(うすしゃま), etc. (romaji: Ususama Myō'ō, Usushama Myō'ō, etc.) 穢跡金剛(えしゃくこんごう) (romaji: Eshaku Kongō) 火頭金剛(かとうこんごう) (romaji: Katō Kongō), etc.
- Korean: 오추사마명왕 (RR: Ochusama Myeongwang) 예적금강 (RR: Yejeok Geumgang) 화두금강 (RR: Hwadu Geumgang), etc.
- Tibetan: Wylie: Khro bo sMe brtzegs mNol ba med pa sMe ba brtsegs pa
- Vietnamese: Ô Xu Sa Ma Minh Vương; Uế Tích Kim Cương, etc.

Information
- Venerated by: Mahayana, Vajrayana
- Attributes: Destroyer of defilements Toilet god

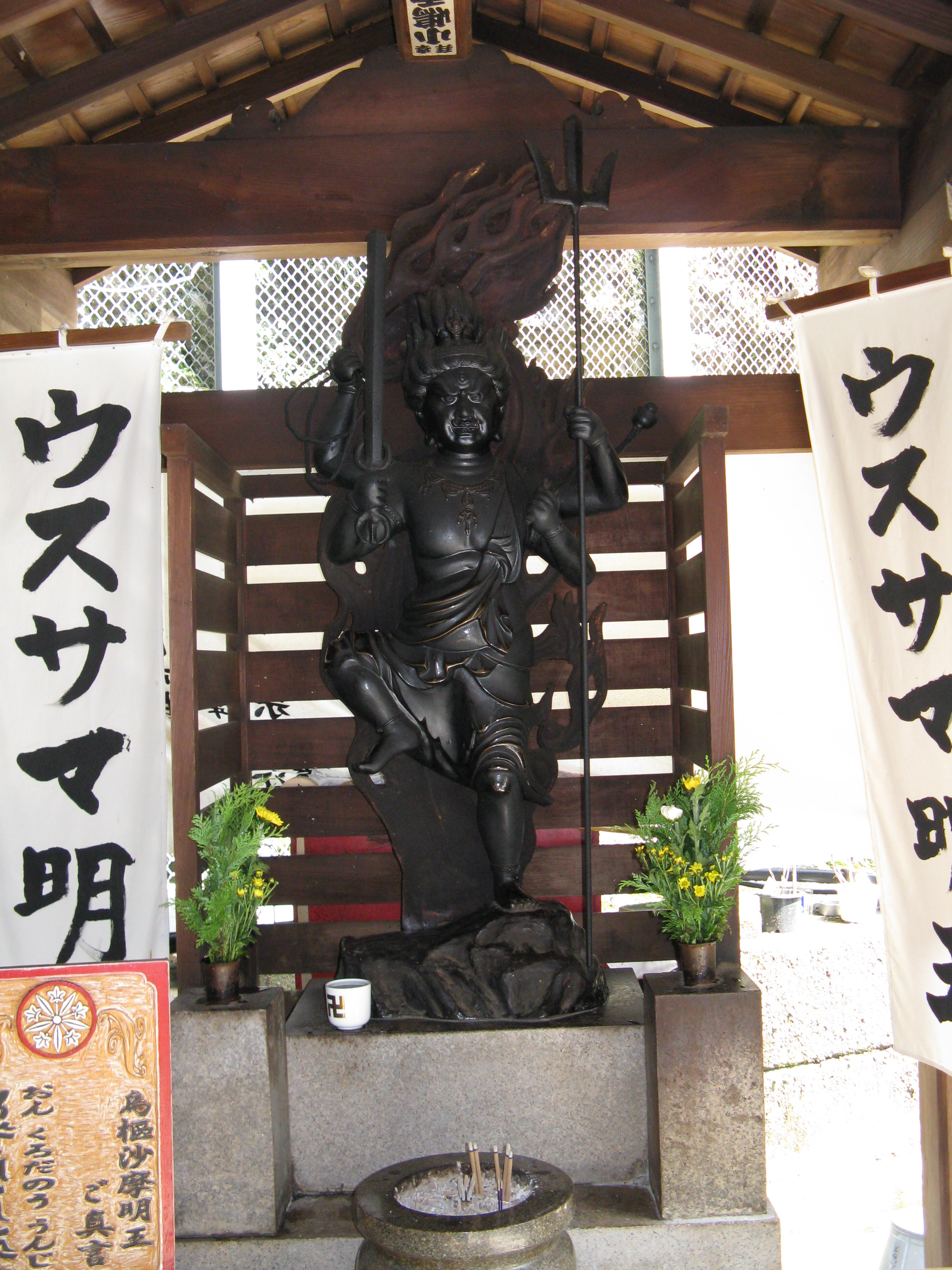
Hōzan-ji

Ucchuṣma (Chinese: 穢跡金剛; pinyin: Huìjì Jīngāng; Rōmaji: Eshaku Kongō) is a Vidyārāja in Mahayana and Vajrayana Buddhism.

Ucchuṣma's full name in Sanskrit sources is Vajra Krodha Mahābala Ucchuṣma (lit. "Great Strength Furious Diamond Ucchuṣma"). This is translated as Chinese: 大力威怒金刚烏芻使摩; pinyin: Dàlì Wēinù Jīngāng Wūchúshǐmó, from the Chinese version of the Sūtra of Mahābala and the Tibetan version of the Ārya-Mahābalanāma Mahāyāna Sūtra.

== Name ==
Ucchuṣma is known by various epithets and names in Chinese and Japanese Buddhism, which developed due to controversy surrounding the negative associations with impurities surrounding some of his names.

=== Epithets ===
- The Vajra-being of Impure Traces (traditional Chinese: 穢跡金剛; simplified Chinese: 秽迹金刚; pinyin: Huìjì Jīngāng; Japanese pronunciation: Eshakukongō)
- The Vajra-being who Removes Impurities (除秽金刚; 除穢金剛; Chúhuì Jīngāng)
- The Vajra-being of Secret Traces (密迹金刚; 密跡金剛; Mìjī jīngāng; Misshaku Kongō)
- The Vajra-being of Fire Head (火首金刚; 火首金剛; Huǒshǒu jīngāng; Kashu Kongō)
- The Vajra-being of Contact (受触金刚; 受触金剛; Shòuchù jīngāng; Jusoku Kongo)

=== Transliterations ===
- Ucchuṣma Vidyārāja (Transliteration 1) (乌枢沙摩明王; 烏枢沙摩明王; Wūshūshāmó Míngwáng; Ususama Myōō)
  - Transliteration 2: (乌枢瑟摩明王; 烏枢瑟摩明王; Wūshūsèmó Míngwáng; Ususama Myōō)
  - Transliteration 3: (乌瑟沙摩明王; 烏瑟沙摩明王; Wūsèshāmó Míngwáng; Ususama Myōō)
  - Transliteration 4: (乌刍沙摩明王; 烏芻沙摩明王; Wūchúshāmó Míngwáng; Uzusama Myōō)

== Śūraṅgama Sūtra ==
According to the Śūraṅgama Sūtra, Shakyamuni Buddha asked the bodhisattvas and arhats to present their methods of understanding the ultimate truth. The eighteenth person to present his character was Ucchuṣma. The Sūtra states:

Ucchuṣma came before the Buddha, put his palms together, bowed at the Buddha’s feet, and said to the Buddha, "I can still remember how many kalpas ago I was filled with excessive greed and desire. There was a Buddha in the world named King of Emptiness. He said that people with too much desire turn into a raging mass of fire. He taught me to contemplate the coolness and warmth throughout my entire body.

A spiritual light coalesced inside and transformed my thoughts of excessive lust into the fire of wisdom. After that, when any of the Buddhas summoned me, they used the name 'fire-head.'

From the strength of the fire-light samādhi, I accomplished Arhatship. I made a great vow that when each of the Buddhas accomplishes the way, I will be a powerful knight and in person subdue the demons' hatred.

The Buddha asks about perfect penetration. I used attentive contemplation of the effects of heat in my body and mind, until it became unobstructed and penetrating and all my outflows were consumed. I produced a blazing brilliance and ascended to enlightenment. This is the foremost method."

== Ucchuṣma Vajrapāla Sūtra ==
The Ucchuṣma Vajrapāla Sūtra asserts that Ucchuṣma is actually the Vajra manifestation of Shakyamuni Buddha. Legend has it that when Shakyamuni Buddha was about to enter into Nirvana, all heavenly beings, with the exception of the ‘Spiral Hair-knot Brahma King’, came to pay their respect to Buddha. The Brahma King was in fact enjoying himself with the heavenly maidens in his own celestial palace. The heavenly gods, being unhappy with the arrogance of the Brahma King, went to his abode and try to persuade him to attend the Dharma assembly. Upon reaching his palace however, the gods found themselves trapped in the defiled energy cast by the supernatural powers of the king. Even some of the Vajra Deities (金剛神) who were later sent to apprehend the Brahma King were imprisoned by the foul forces as well.

When Shakyamuni Buddha came to learn of this, He employed His Original Wisdom (本智), and the Light of Perpetual Joy and Pliancy was emitted from His heart. Ucchuṣma Vajrapāla (穢跡金剛) soon appeared from amidst the revolving radiance of the Buddha's heart, and ascended to the celestial palace of the Brahma King. Despite the defiled energy hurled at Him by the Brahma King, Ucchuṣma was unharmed as he immediately turned these forces of contamination into ordinary soil. In no time, the Brahma King was subdued and brought to the feet of Shakyamuni Buddha. For this reason, Ucchuṣma is also known as the "Filth-Eliminating Vajrapāla" (不淨金剛).

== Mantras ==
According to the Ucchuṣma Vidyārāja Dhāraṇi, the mantra provided should be recited forty thousand times by any good man or good woman who is besieged with ailments inflicted by evil spirits. On the tenth day of purification, it should be recited one thousand eight times resulting in the removal of myriad afflictions. The mantra is as follows:

Oṃ vajra-krodha mahābala hana daha paca mātha vi-kiraṇa vidhavaṃsaya ucchuṣma-krodha huṃ huṃ huṃ phaṭ phaṭ phaṭ svāhā

The short dhāraṇi of Ucchuṣma Vajrapāla:

- Oṃ krodhana hūṃ jaḥ

Mantras for other purposes:

- Oṃ śūri śūri mahā-śūri śūśūri svāhā (Purification of speech)
- Oṃ śutāri śutāri śumari śumari svāhā (Purification of action)
- Oṃ śrimali mamali mali śuśri svāhā (Removal of filth)

== Veneration ==
=== China ===
In China and overseas Chinese communities, Ucchuṣma is mainly venerated by the Chan tradition who mainly venerates him for his role in the Śūraṅgama Sūtra. He has also penetrated into the traditions of the other schools of Buddhism, such as Tiantai, Huayan and Pure Land Buddhism, as well as Taoism and popular religion. Known in particular as a scatological, obstetrical, and talismanic god, Ucchuṣma has often been invoked in therapeutic, exorcistic, birth and āveśa, or spirit possession, rituals in imperial China. Starting from the late Tang period, he gradually increased in popularity outside of his marginal position in maṇḍalas, eventually thriving as an independent protector deity with his own cult. His statue can be found in certain temples, usually enshrined in the Mahavira Hall. He is also commonly invoked using his mantra during the extensive Shuilu Fahui ceremony as the wrathful manifestation of Śākyamuni Buddha, where he, along with other protector dharmapalas such as the Ten Wisdom Kings, are entreated to protect the ritual space. During the ritual, his image in the form of a Shuilu ritual painting is typically enshrined ahead of a maṇḍala (壇; tán) consisting of the Ten Wisdom Kings.

In the Fujian region of Mainland China as well as Taiwan, Ucchusma is also one of the deities who are regularly invoked by Buddhist adepts and Taoist ritual masters in various ritualistic ceremonies, including rites of exorcism. The tradition of performing these rituals, as well as the liturgical works on which the rituals are based on, have a history dating back to at least the early Ming period.

In addition, Ucchusma is sometimes paired or identified with Guhyapāda, who is commonly known in Chinese as Mìjī Jīngāng (密跡金剛). In a thirteenth-century Chinese long gāthā elaborating on the two major scriptures relating to Ucchusama, the Huiji Jin’gang Shuo Shentong Daman Tuoluoni Fashu Lingyao Men (穢跡金剛說神通大滿陀羅尼法術靈要 門經; "The Scripture of the Numinous and Essential Gate to the Ritual Techniques of the Great Perfection Dhāraṇī of Supernatural Power as Spoken by the Vajra-being of Impure Traces"; T. 1228"), and the Huiji Jin’gang Jin Baibian Fajing (穢跡金剛禁百變法經; "The Scripture of the Rites of the Vajra-being of Impure Traces for Binding the Hundred Transformations"; T. 1229"), Ucchuṣma's Chinese name Huìjì Jīngāng was changed to Mìjī Jīngāng due to negative connotations associated with the former name. In the Chongbian Zhutian Zhuan (重編諸天傳;; 'Recompiled Biographies of Devas and Devīs') from the Southern Song period, one of the Sanskrit transliterations given for Guhyapāda is Ucchuṣma. In a repentance ritual for the Śūraṅgama Sūtra, both Guhyapāda and Ucchusama were invoked as a pair. The two wrathful deities were also sometimes found standing opposite each other at the entrances of some monasteries.

=== Japan ===
In Japan, Ucchuṣma is venerated in several schools of Buddhism, including Tendai, Shingon, Zen and Nichiren. He is recognized as a guardian of the bathroom, where his effigy is often present. He is known to the general public for his powers of purification of the unclean, in particular in respect to sexual diseases.

Ucchuṣma was also thought to be able to change a female fetus into a male one.

==== Temples ====
A non-exhaustive list of temples that enshrine Ucchuṣma are as follows, arranged according to tradition:

==== Shingon ====
- Mangan-ji (Chiba)
- Kiburi-ji (Gifu)
- Fudō-in (Kyoto)

==== Tendai ====
- Tōkō-ji (Tokyo)
- Kannonshō-ji (Shiga)

==== Sōtō Zen ====
- Kaiun-ji (Tokyo)
- Zuiryū-ji (Toyama)
- Akiba Sōhonden Kasuisai (Shizuoka)
- Myōtoku-ji (Shizuoka)
- Daikō-in (Aichi)

==== Jōdo-shū ====
- Tairyū-ji (Tokyo)

==== Nichiren ====
- Gokoku-ji (Kyoto)
- Honkyō-ji (Hyōgo)

== See also ==
- List of Chinese deities
- List of Japanese deities
