= Vajrayakṣa =

One of the Five Wisdom Kings

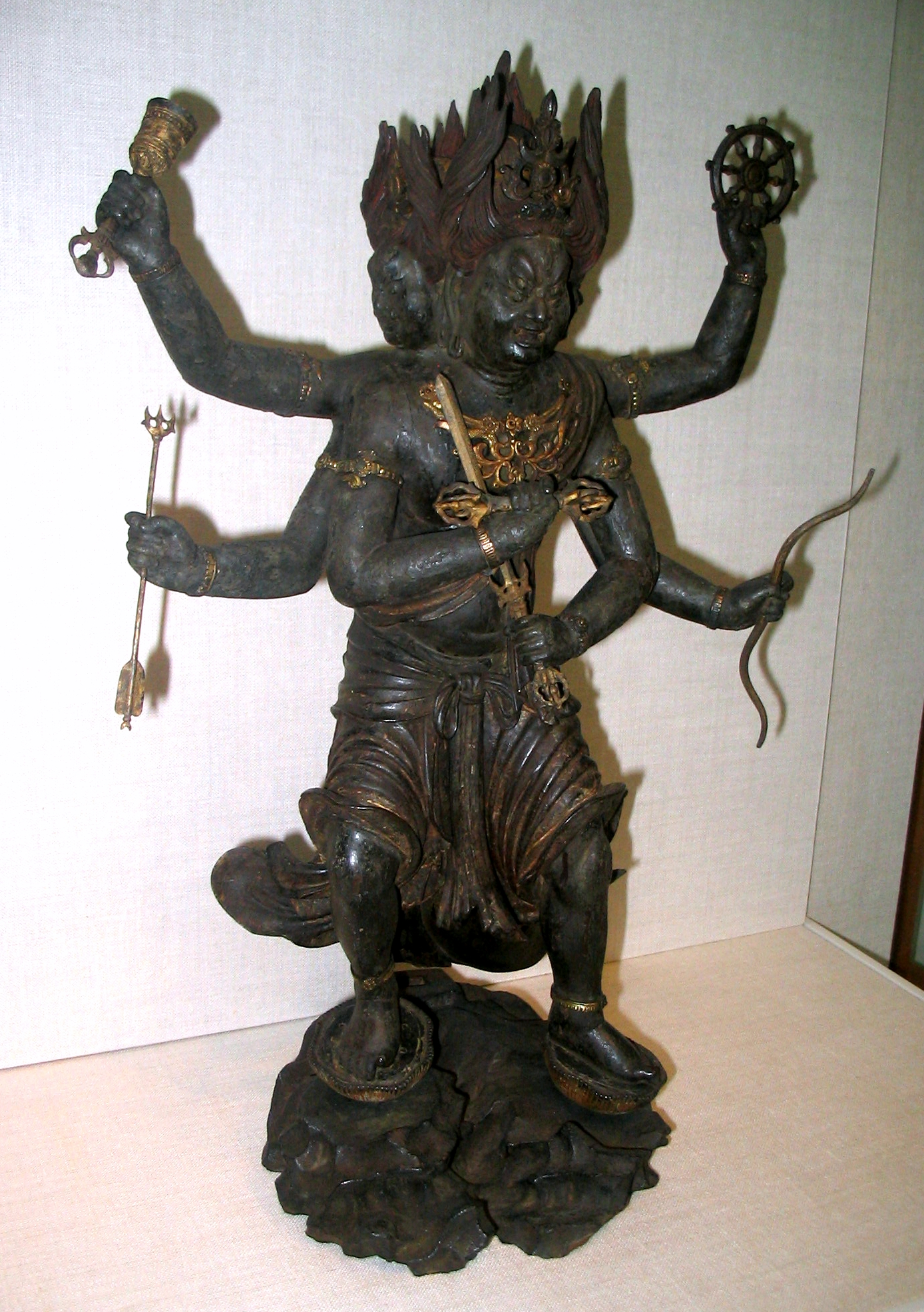
Vajrayakṣa Vidya-Raja

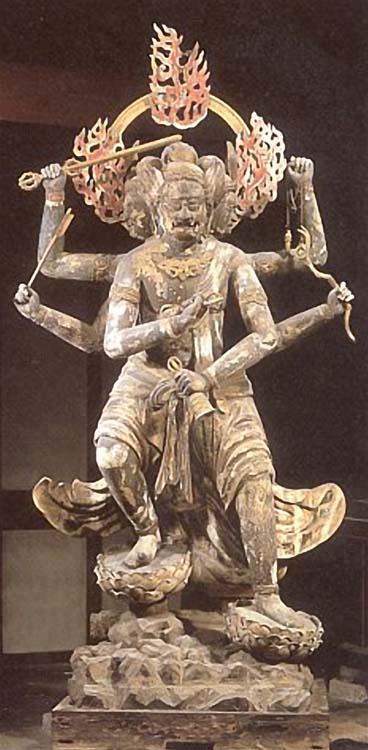
Vajrayakṣa Vidya-Raja

Vajrayakṣa Vidya-Raja (金剛夜叉明王 or 金剛夜叉明王 in Chinese) is one of the Five Wisdom Kings. He is a manifestation of Amoghasiddhi.

He goes by many names including Kongō-yasha, Vajrayakṣa, or Jingang Yecha Mingwang.
