= Acala =

One of Wisdom kings in Buddhism

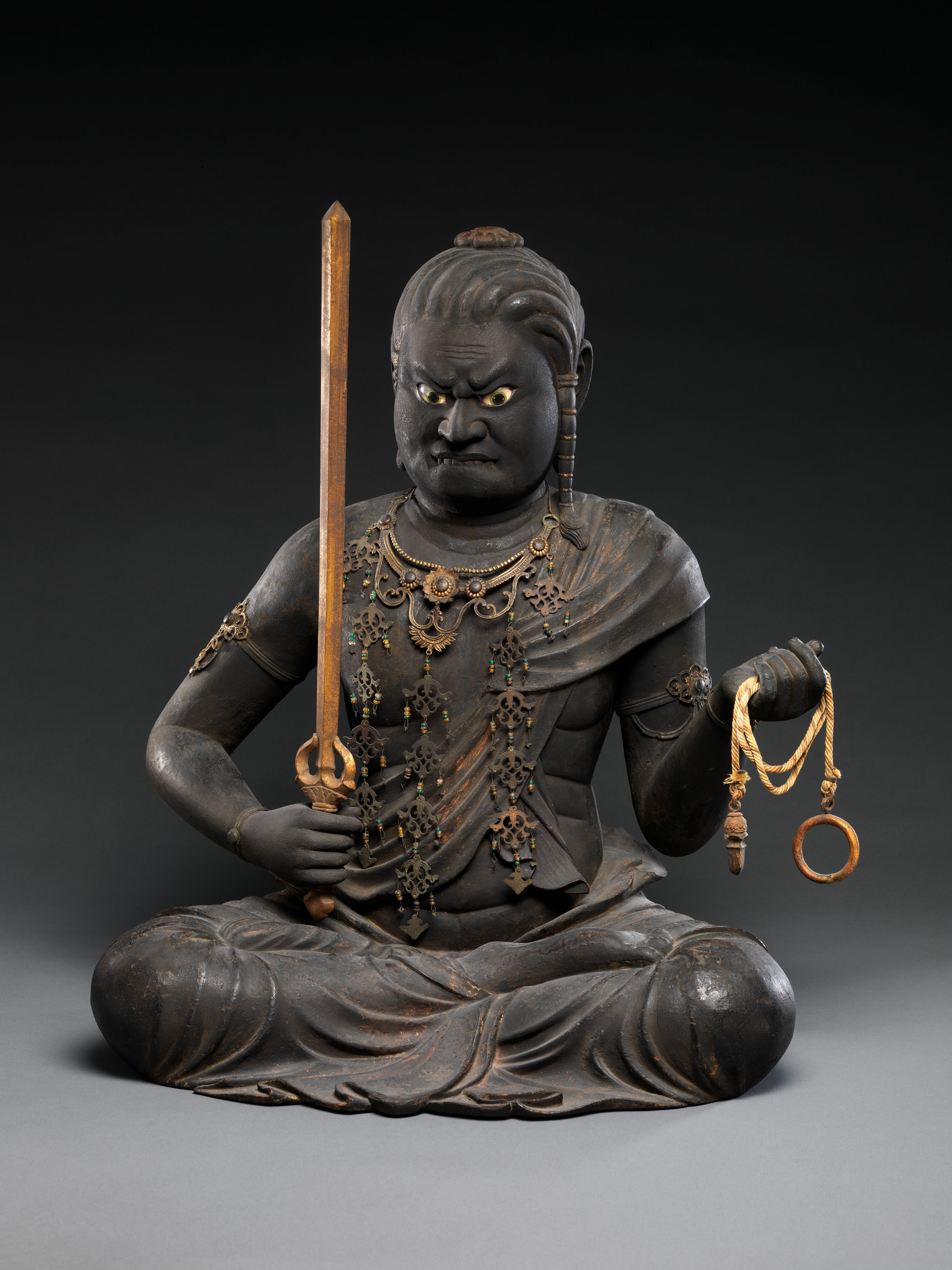
- Statue of Fudō Myōō (Acala), from early 13th century (Kamakura period) Japan
- Sanskrit: अचल (Acala); अचलनाथ (Acalanātha); आर्याचलनाथ (Āryācalanātha); अचलवज्र (Acalavajra); चण्डरोषण (Caṇḍaroṣaṇa); चण्डमहारोषण (Caṇḍamahāroṣaṇa); महाचण्डरोषण (Mahācaṇḍaroṣaṇa)
- Chinese: simplified Chinese: 不动明王; traditional Chinese: 不動明王; pinyin: Bùdòng Míngwáng; 不动金刚明王; 不動金剛明王; Bùdòng Jīngāng Míngwáng; 不动使者; 不動使者; Bùdòng Shǐzhě; 不动如来使; 不動如來使; Bùdòng Rúláishǐ; 不动尊; 不動尊; Bùdòng-zūn; 无动明王; 無動明王; Wúdòng Míngwáng; 无动尊; 無動尊; Wúdòng-zūn; 无动使者; 無動使者; Wúdòng Shǐzhě; 阿遮罗; 阿遮羅; Āzhēluó; 阿遮罗囊他; 阿遮羅囊他; Āzhēluónángtā; 阿梨耶阿左罗嚢多尾侕耶罗惹; 阿梨耶阿左羅嚢多尾侕耶羅惹; Ālíyé Āzuǒluónángduō Wěinǐyéluórě
- Japanese: 不動明王 (Fudō Myōō); 大日大聖不動明王 (Dainichi Daishō Fudō Myōō); 不動尊 (Fudō-son); 不動使者 (Fudō Shisha); 不動如来使 (Fudō Nyoraishi); 無動明王 Mudō Myōō); 無動尊 (Mudō-son); 聖無動尊 (Shō-Mudō-son); 阿遮羅 (Ashara); 阿遮羅囊他 (Asharanōta); 阿梨耶阿左羅嚢多尾儞耶羅惹 (Ariya Asharanōta Bijaranja); お不動さん (O-Fudō-san); お不動様 / お不動さま (O-Fudō-sama)
- Korean: 부동명왕 (Budong Myeongwang)
- Mongolian: Азаланата / Миёогомбо
- Tibetan: མི་གཡོ་བ་ (Miyowa)
- Vietnamese: Bất Động Minh Vương

Information
- Venerated by: Vajrayana Buddhism, Mahayana Buddhism, Shugendō
- Attributes: vajra, lasso (pāśa), khanda

Acala or Achala (Sanskrit: अचल, "The Immovable", IPA: [ˈɐt͜ɕɐlɐ]), also known as Acalanātha (अचलनाथ, "Immovable Lord") or Āryācalanātha (आर्याचलनाथ, "Noble Immovable Lord"), is a wrathful deity and dharmapala (protector of the Dharma) prominent in Vajrayana Buddhism and East Asian Buddhism.

Originally a minor deity described as a messenger or acolyte of the buddha Vairocana, Acala later rose to prominence as an object of veneration in his own right as a remover of obstacles and destroyer of evil, eventually becoming seen as the wrathful manifestation of either Vairocana, the Buddha Akṣobhya, or the Bodhisattva Mañjuśrī. In later texts, he is also called Caṇḍaroṣaṇa (चण्डरोषण, "Violent Wrathful One", IPA: [t͜ɕɐɳɖɐˈroːʂɐɳɐ]) or Caṇḍamahāroṣaṇa (चण्डमहारोषण, "Violent One of Great Wrath", IPA: [t͜ɕɐɳɖɐmɐɦaːˈroːʂɐɳɐ]), the names by which he is more commonly known in countries like Nepal and Tibet.

In East Asian esoteric Buddhism, Acala is classed among the Wisdom Kings (Vidyārāja) and is preeminent among the five Wisdom Kings of the Womb Realm. Accordingly, he occupies an important hierarchical position in the Mandala of the Two Realms. In China, he is known as Bùdòng Míngwáng (不動明王, "Immovable Wisdom King", the Chinese translation of Sanskrit Acala(nātha) Vidyārāja), while in Japan, he is called Fudō Myōō, the on'yomi reading of his Chinese name. Acala (as Fudō) is one of the especially important and well-known divinities in Japanese Buddhism, being especially venerated in the Shingon, Tendai, Zen, and Nichiren sects, as well as in Shugendō.

Acala has been worshiped throughout the Middle Ages and into modern times in Nepal, Tibet, China and Japan, where sculptural and pictorial representations of him are most often found.

== Origins and development ==
Acala first appears in the Amoghapāśakalparāja Sūtra (Chinese: 不空羂索神変真言經; pinyin: Bùkōng juànsuǒ shénbiàn zhēnyán jīng, translated by Bodhiruci circa 707-709 CE), where he is described as a servant or messenger of the buddha Vairocana:

The first from the west in the northern quadrant is the acolyte Acala (不動使者). In his left hand he grasps a noose and in his right hand he holds a sword. He is seated in the half-lotus position.

More well-known, however, is the following passage from the Mahāvairocana Tantra (also known as the Mahāvairocanābhisaṃbodhi Tantra or the Vairocana Sūtra) which refers to Acala as one of the deities of the Womb Realm Mandala:

Below the mantra-lord (i.e., Vairocana), in the direction of Nairṛti (i.e., southwest),
Is Acala, the Tathāgata's servant (不動如來使): he holds a wisdom sword and a noose (pāśa),
The hair from the top of his head hangs down on his left shoulder, and with one eye he looks fixedly;
Awesomely wrathful, his body [is enveloped in] fierce flames, and he rests on a rock;
His face is marked with [a frown like] waves on water, and he has the figure of a stout young boy.

The deity was apparently popular in India during the 8th-9th centuries as evident by the fact that six of the Sanskrit texts translated by the esoteric master Amoghavajra into Chinese are devoted entirely to him. Indeed, Acala's rise to a more prominent position in the Esoteric pantheon in East Asian Buddhism may be credited in part to the writings of Amoghavajra and his teacher Vajrabodhi.

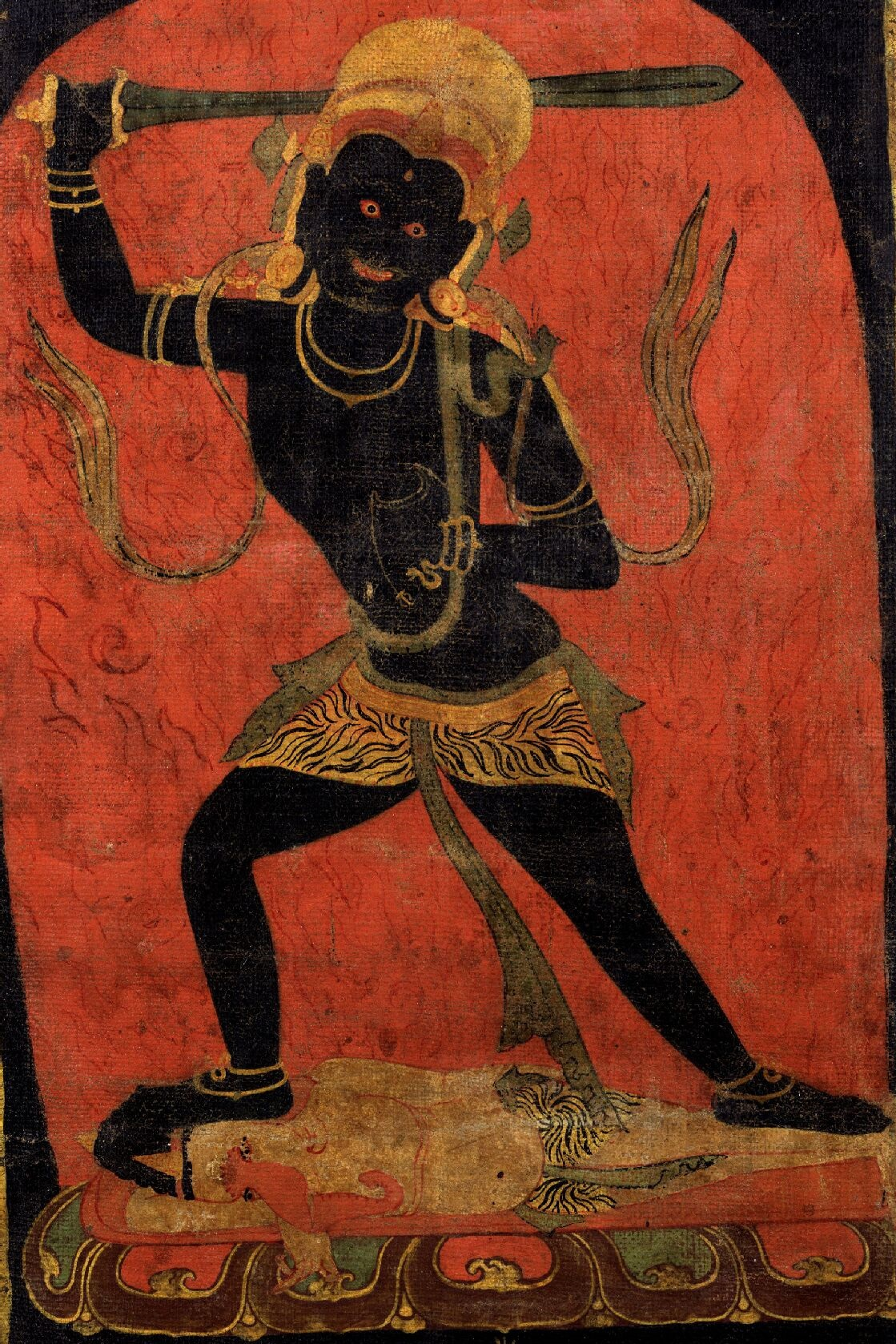
12th century Tibetan (Kadampa school) painting of Acala stepping on Vighnarāja, the "Lord of Obstacles"

While some scholars have put forward the theory that Acala originated from the Hindu god Shiva, particularly his attributes of destruction and reincarnation, Bernard Faure suggested the wrathful esoteric deity Trailokyavijaya (whose name is an epithet of Shiva), the Vedic fire god Agni, and the guardian deity Vajrapani to be other, more likely prototypes for Acala. He notes: "one could theoretically locate Acala's origins in a generic Śiva, but only in the sense that all Tantric deities can in one way or another be traced back to Śiva." Faure compares Acala to Vajrapani in that both were originally minor deities who eventually came to occupy important places in the Buddhist pantheon.

Acala is said to be a powerful deity who protects the faithful by burning away all impediments (antarāya) and defilements (kleśa), thus aiding them towards enlightenment. In a commentary on the Mahāvairocana Tantra by Yi Xing, he is said to have manifested in the world following Vairocana's vow to save all beings, and that his primary function is to remove obstacles to enlightenment. Indeed, the tantra instructs the ritual practitioner to recite Acala's mantras or to visualize himself as Acala in order to remove obstacles.

From a humble acolyte, Acala evolved into a powerful demon-subduing deity. In later texts such as the Caṇḍamahāroṣaṇa Tantra, Acala - under the name Caṇḍaroṣaṇa ("Violent Wrathful One") or Caṇḍamahāroṣaṇa ("Violent One of Great Wrath") - is portrayed as the "frightener of gods, titans, and men, the destroyer of the strength of demons" who slays ghosts and evil spirits with his fierce anger. In the Sādhanamālā, the gods Vishnu, Shiva, Brahma and Kandarpa - described as "wicked" beings who subject humanity to endless rebirth - are said to be terrified of Acala because he carries a rope to bind them.

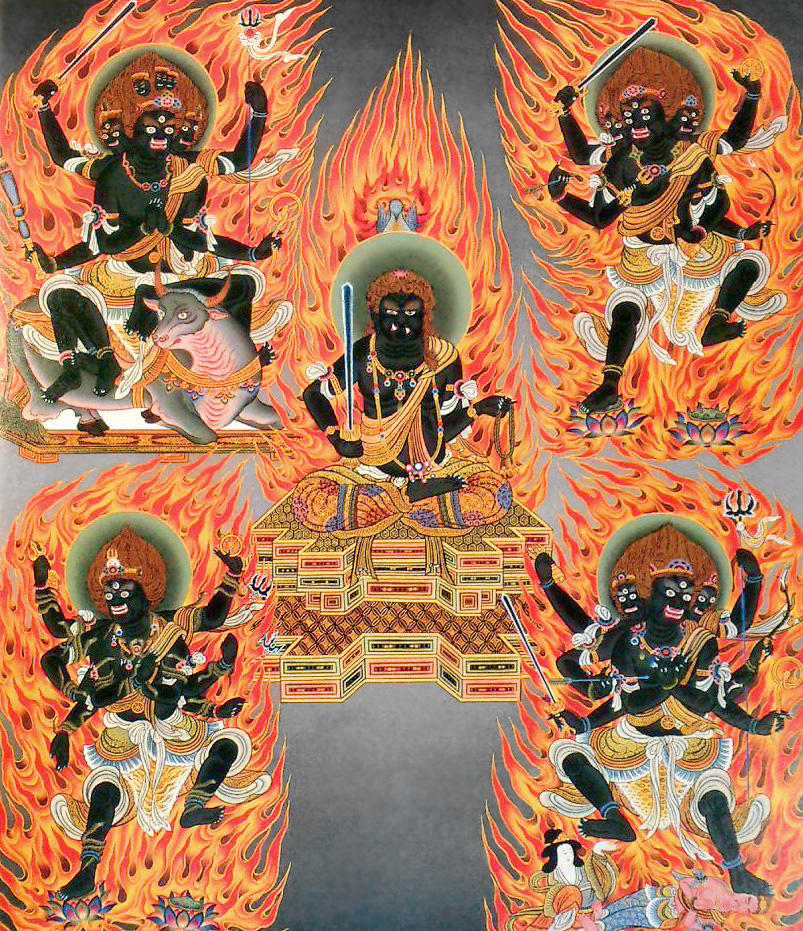
The five Wisdom Kings (Vidyarāja, Myōō) of Shingon Buddhism: Acala (Fudō, center), Trailokyavijaya (Gōzanze, lower right), Amṛtakuṇḍalin (Gundari, lower left), Yamāntaka (Daiitoku, upper left), and Vajrayakṣa (Kongōyasha, upper right)

In Tibetan Buddhism, Acala or Miyowa (Tibetan: མི་གཡོ་བ་, Wylie: mi g.yo ba) is considered as belonging to the vajrakula ("vajra family", Tibetan: དོ་རྗེའི་རིགས་, Wylie: rdo rje'i rigs, THL: dorjé rik), one of the Five Buddha Families presided over by the buddha Akṣobhya and may even be regarded, along with the other deities of the kula, as an aspect or emanation of the latter. He is thus sometimes depicted in South Asian art wearing a crown with an effigy of Akṣobhya. In Nepal, Acala may also be identified as a manifestation of the bodhisattva Mañjuśrī. He has a consort named Viśvavajrī in both the Nepalese and Tibetan traditions, with whom he is at times depicted in yab-yum union.

By contrast, the sanrinjin (三輪身, "bodies of the three wheels") theory, based on Amoghavajra's writings and prevalent in Japanese esoteric Buddhism (Mikkyō), interprets Acala as an incarnation of Vairocana. In this system, the five chief vidyārājas or Wisdom Kings (明王, Myōō), of which Acala is one, are interpreted as the wrathful manifestations (教令輪身, kyōryōrin-shin, lit. ""embodiments of the wheel of injunction") of the Five Great Buddhas, who appear both as gentle bodhisattvas to teach the Dharma and also as fierce wrathful deities to subdue and convert hardened nonbelievers. Under this conceptualization, vidyārājas are ranked superior to dharmapalas (護法善神, gohō zenshin), a different class of guardian deities. However, this interpretation, while common in Japan, is not necessarily universal: in Nichiren-shū, for instance, Acala and Rāgarāja (Aizen Myōō), the two vidyārājas who commonly feature in the mandalas inscribed by Nichiren, are seen as protective deities (外護神, gegoshin) who respectively embody the two tenets of hongaku ("original enlightenment") doctrine: "life and death (saṃsāra) are precisely nirvana" (生死即涅槃, shōji soku nehan) and "worldly passions (kleśa) are precisely enlightenment (bodhi)" (煩悩即菩提, bonnō soku bodai).

== Iconography ==
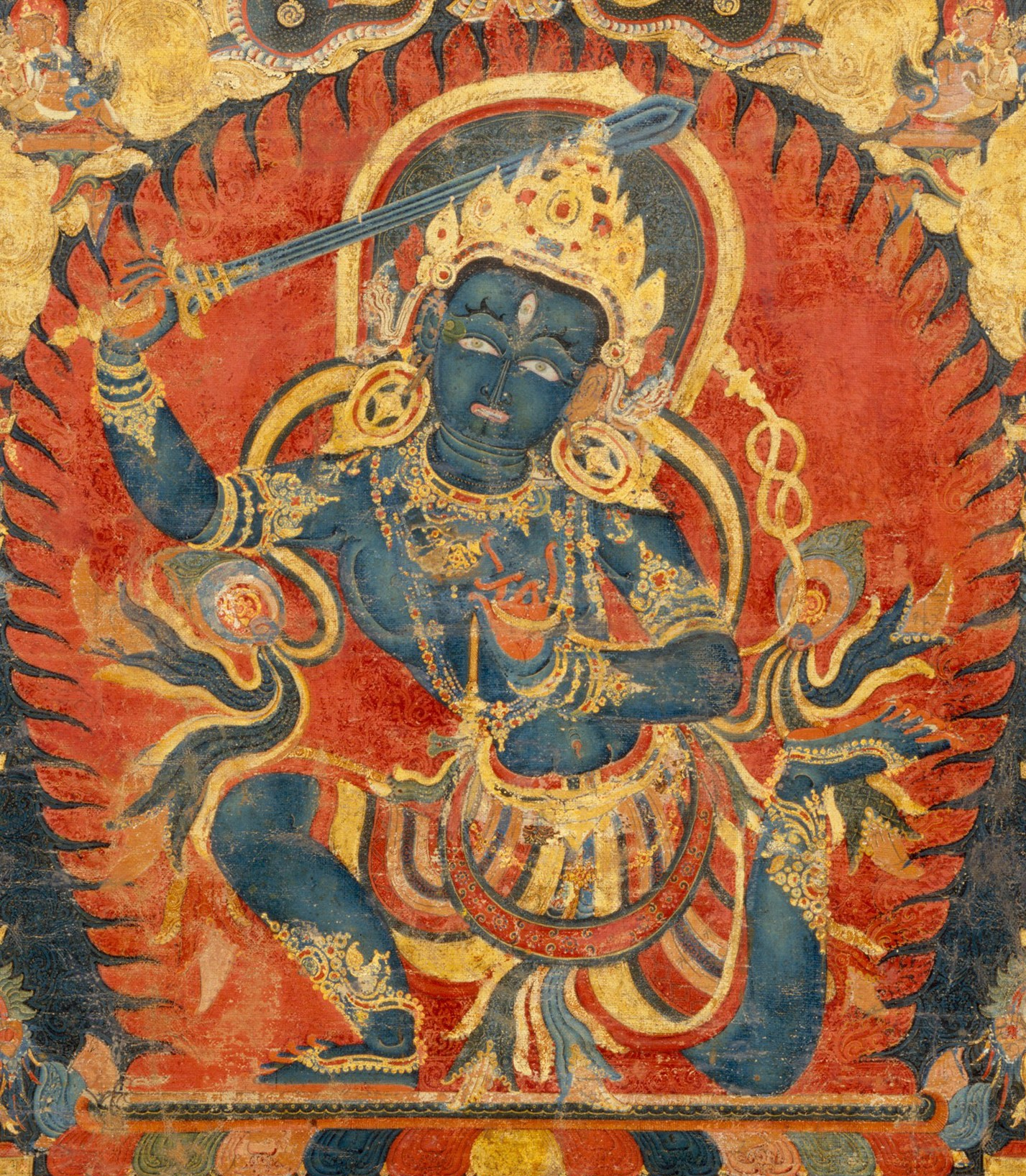
A 14th century (early Malla period) Nepalese depiction of a kneeling Acala

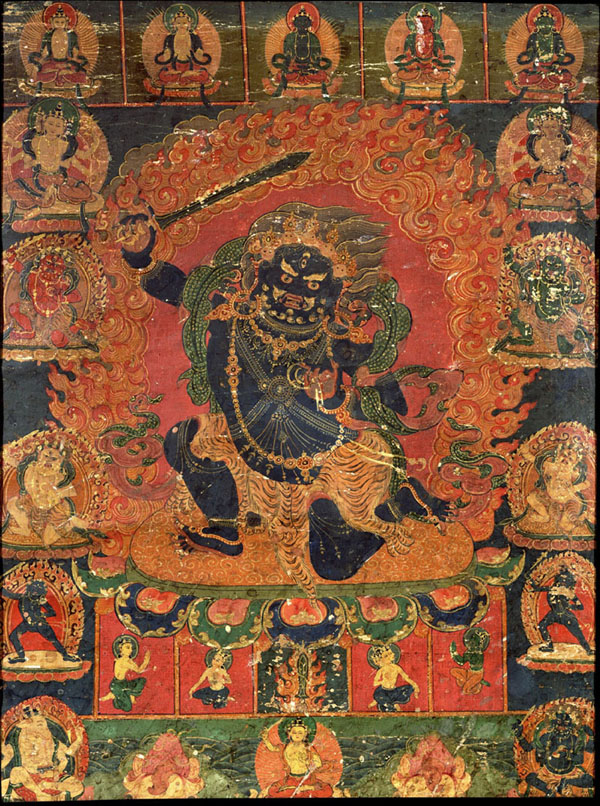
Tibetan depiction of Acala Vidya-Raja

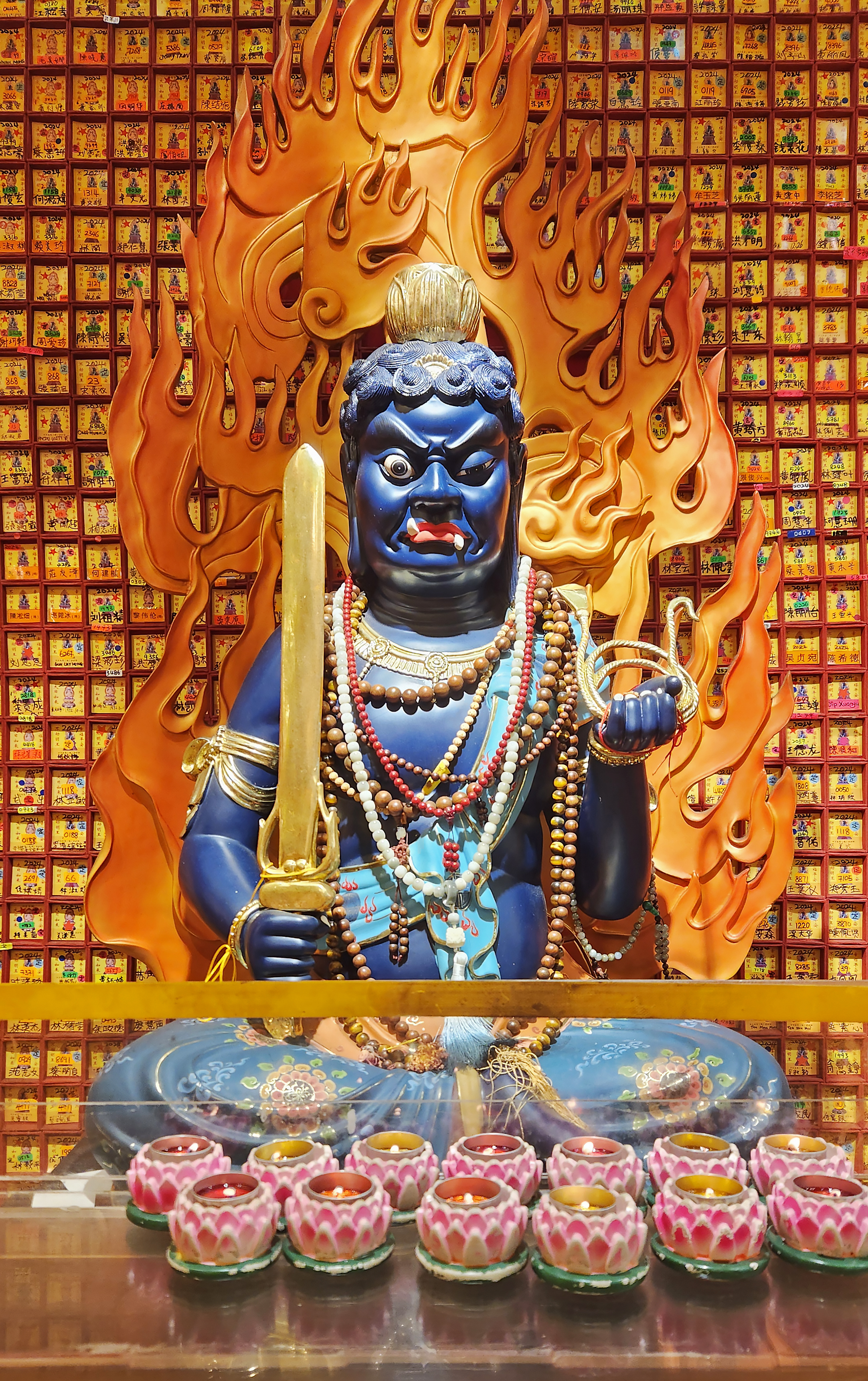
Seated statue of Acala with the Kurikara Sword and a noose at Waterloo Street, Singapore.

The Caṇḍamahāroṣaṇa Tantra's description of Acala is a good summary of the deity's depiction in South Asian Buddhist art.

"His right hand is terrifying with a sword in it,
His left is holding a noose;
He is making a threatening gesture with his index finger,
And bites his lower lip with his fangs.
"Kicking with his right foot,
He is smashing the four Māras.
His left knee is on the ground.
Squint eyed, he inspires fear.
"He points a threatening gesture at Vasudhā [i.e. the earth],
Kneeling on the cap of his left knee.
He has Akṣobhya for his crest jewel;
He is of blue color and wears a jewel diadem.
"A princely youth, Wearing Five Braids of Hair,
Adorned with all the ornaments,
He appears to be sixteen years old,
And his eyes are red—he, the powerful one."

In Nepalese and Tibetan art, Acala is usually shown either kneeling on his left knee or standing astride, bearing a noose or lasso (pāśa) and an upraised sword. Some depictions portray him trampling on the elephant-headed Vighnarāja (lit. "Ruler of Hindrances", a Buddhist equivalent to the Hindu god Ganesha, albeit interpreted negatively as one who causes obstacles), signifying his role as the destroyer of impediments to enlightenment. He may also be shown wearing a tiger skin, with snakes coiled around his arms and body.

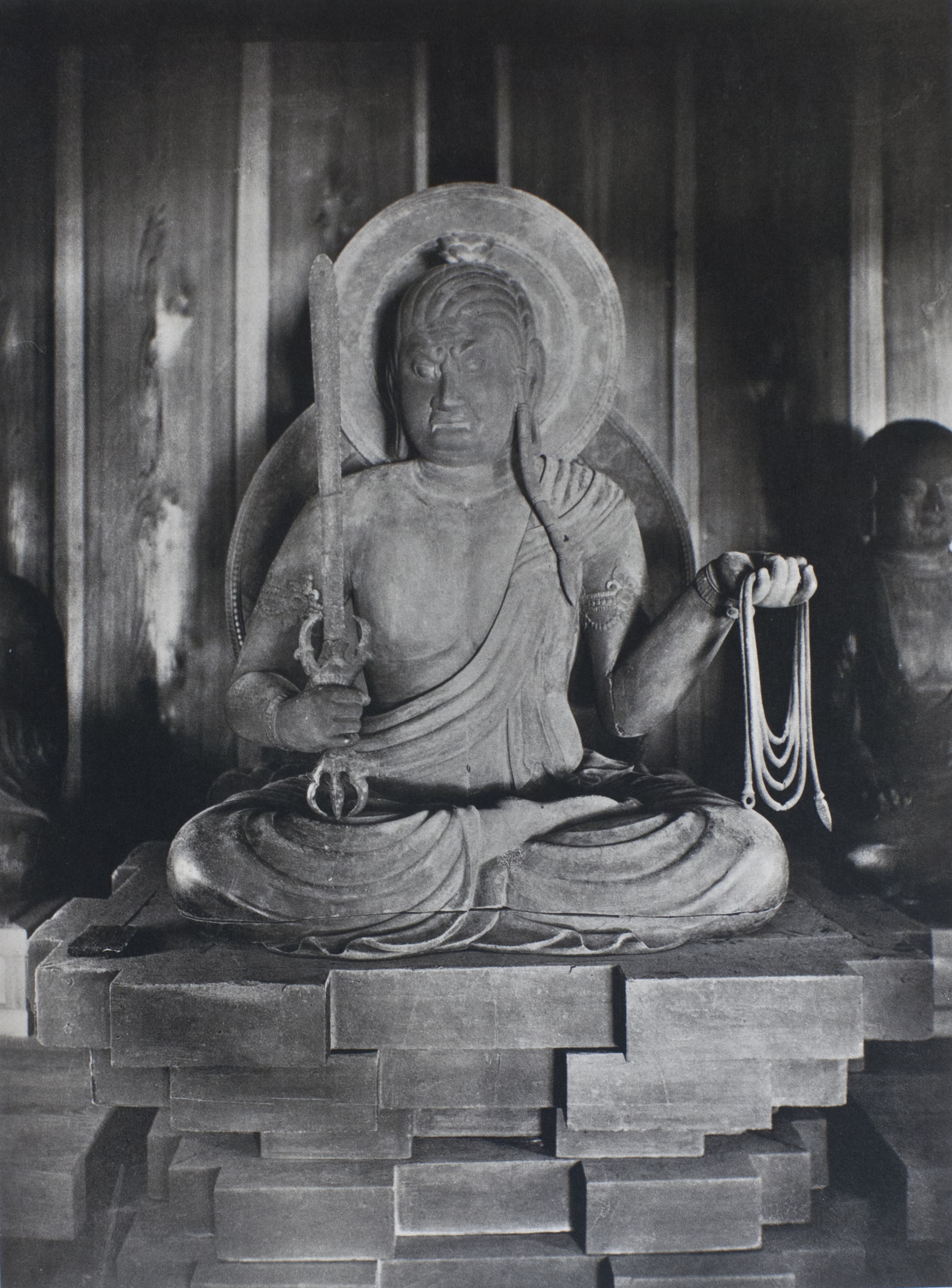
Statue of Acala in the Lecture Hall (Kōdō) of Tō-ji in Kyoto

By contrast, portrayals of Acala (Fudō) in Japan generally tend to conform to the description given in the Amoghapāśakalparāja Sūtra and the Mahāvairocana Tantra: holding a lasso and a sword while sitting or standing on a rock (盤石座, banjakuza) or a pile of hewn stones (瑟瑟座, shitsushitsuza), with his braided hair hanging from the left of his head. He may also be depicted with a lotus flower - a symbol of enlightenment - on his head (頂蓮, chōren). Unlike the South Asian Acala, whose striding posture conveys movement and dynamism, the Japanese Fudō sits or stands erect, suggesting motionlessness and rigidity. The sword he wields may or may not be flaming and is sometimes described generically as a "jeweled sword" (宝剣, hōken) or "vajra sword" (金剛剣, kongō-ken), which is descriptive of the fact that the sword's pommel is in the shape of the talon-like vajra (金剛杵, kongō-sho). It may also be referred to as a "three-pronged vajra sword" (三鈷剣, sanko-ken). In some cases, he is seen holding the "Kurikara sword" (倶利伽羅剣, Kurikara-ken), a sword with the dragon (nāga) king Kurikara (倶利伽羅; Sanskrit: Kulikāla-rāja or Kṛkāla-rāja) coiled around it. The flaming nimbus or halo behind Acala is commonly known in Japanese as the "Garuda flame" (迦楼羅炎, karura-en) after the mythical fire-breathing bird from Indian mythology.

There are two main variations in the iconography of Acala / Fudō in Japan. The first type (observable in the earliest extant Japanese images of the deity) shows him with wide open, glaring eyes, straight hair braided in rows and two fangs pointed in the same direction; a lotus flower rests above his head. The second type (which first appeared in the late 9th century and became increasingly common during the late Heian and Kamakura periods), by contrast, portrays Acala with curly hair, one eye wide open and/or looking upwards, with the other narrowed and/or looking downwards, an iconographic trait known as the tenchigan (天地眼), "heaven-and-earth eyes". Similarly, one of his fangs is now shown as pointing up, with the other pointing down. In place of the lotus flower, images of this type may sport seven topknots.

Although the squinting left eye and inverted fangs of the second type ultimately derives from the description of Acala given in the Mahāvairocana Tantra and Yi Xing's commentary on the text ("with his lower [right] tooth he bites the upper-right side of his lip, and with his left [-upper tooth he bites] his lower lip which sticks out"), these attributes were mostly absent in Chinese and earlier Japanese icons.

Acala's mismatched eyes and fangs were allegorically interpreted to signify both the duality and nonduality of his nature (and of all reality): the upward fang for instance was interpreted as symbolizing the process of elevation towards enlightenment, with the downward fang symbolizing the descent of enlightened beings into the world to teach sentient beings. The two fangs also symbolize the realms of buddhas and sentient beings, yin and yang, and male and female, with the nonduality of these two polar opposites being expressed by Acala's tightly closed lips.

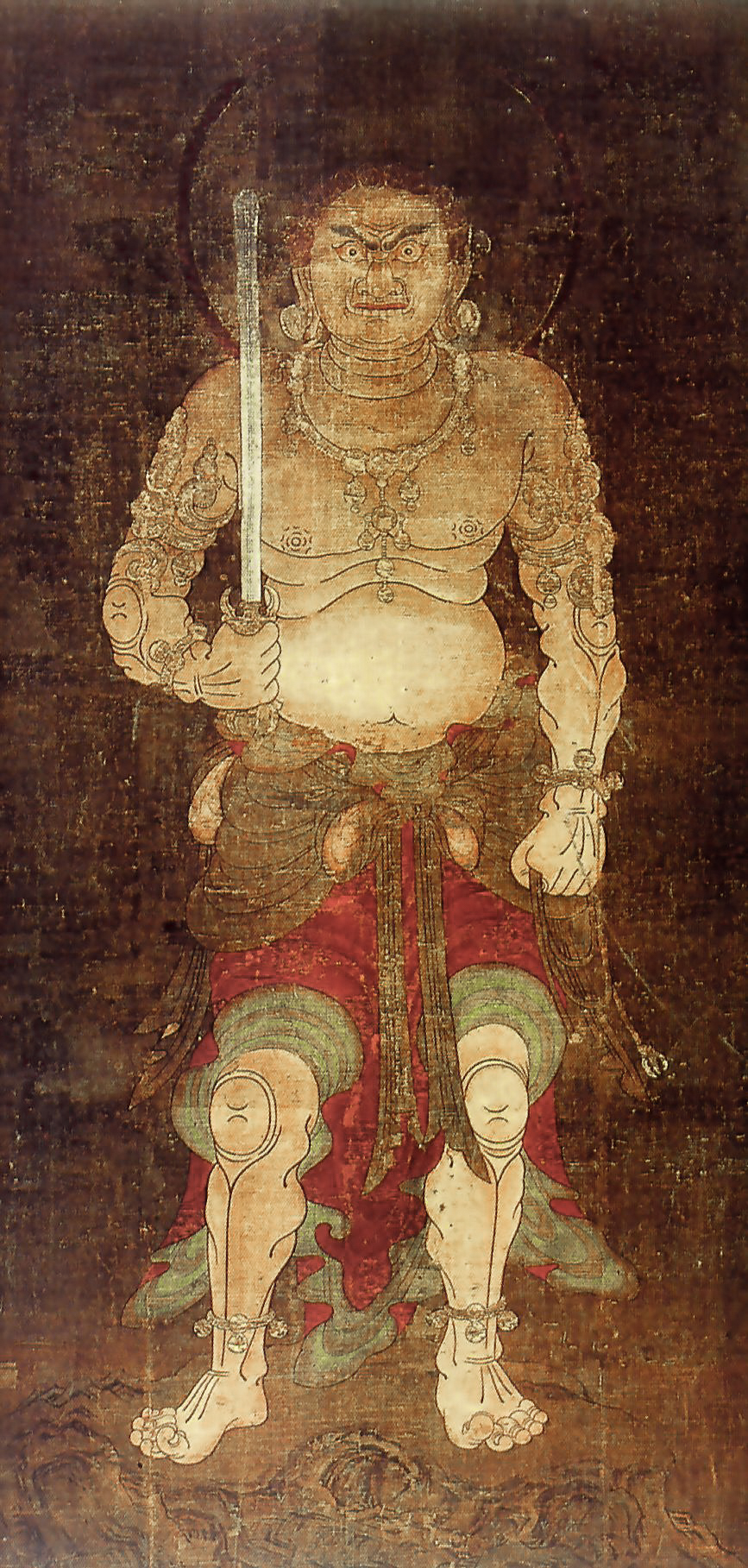
12th century painting of Yellow Acala (黄不動, Ki-Fudō) in Manshu-in in Kyoto, based on an image (not available to public view) kept at Mii-dera in Shiga Prefecture

Acala is commonly shown as having either black or blue skin (the Sādhanamālā describes his color as being "like that of the atasī (flax) flower," which may be either yellow or blue), though he may be at times portrayed in other colors. In Tibet, for instance, a variant of the kneeling Acala depiction shows him as being white in hue "like sunrise on a snow mountain reflecting many rays of light". In Japan, some images may depict Acala sporting a red (赤不動, Aka-Fudō) or yellow (黄不動, Ki-Fudō) complexion. The most famous example of the Aka-Fudō portrayal is a painting kept at Myōō-in on Mount Kōya (Wakayama Prefecture) traditionally attributed to the Heian period Tendai monk Enchin. Legend claims that Enchin, inspired by a vision of Acala, painted the image using his own blood (thus explaining its red color), though recent analysis suggests that the image may have been actually created much later, during the Kamakura period. The most well-known image of the Ki-Fudō type, meanwhile, is enshrined in Mii-dera (Onjō-ji) at the foot of Mount Hiei in Shiga Prefecture and is said to have been based on another vision that Enchin saw while practicing austerities in 838. The original Mii-dera Ki-Fudō is traditionally only shown to esoteric masters (ācārya; 阿闍梨, ajari) during initiation rites and is otherwise not shown to the public, though copies of it have been made. One such copy, made in the 12th century, is kept at Manshu-in in Kyoto.

The deity is usually depicted with one head and two arms, though a few portrayals show him with multiple heads, arms or legs. In Japan, a depiction of Acala with four arms is employed in subjugation rituals and earth-placating rituals (安鎮法, anchin-hō); this four-armed form is identified in one text as "the lord of the various categories [of gods]." An iconographic depiction known as the "Two-Headed Rāgarāja" (両頭愛染, Ryōzu Aizen or Ryōtō Aizen) shows Acala combined with the wisdom king Rāgarāja (Aizen).

=== Acolytes ===
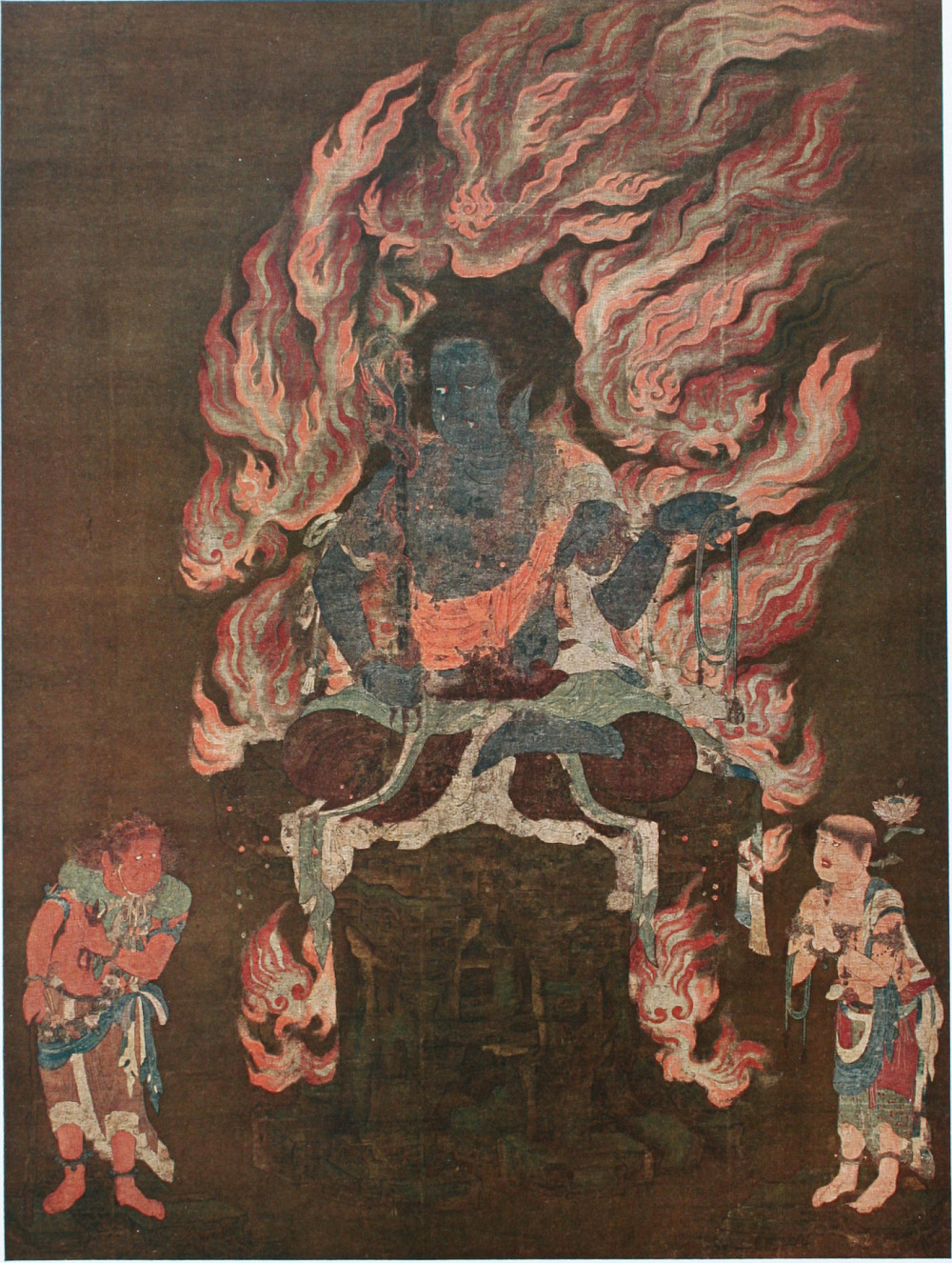
The 'Blue Acala' (青不動, Ao-Fudō) of Shōren-in in Kyoto, showing Acala with his two attendants Kiṃkara (Kongara, right) and Ceṭaka (Seitaka, left)

Acala is sometimes described as having a retinue of acolytes, the number of which vary between sources, usually two or eight but sometimes thirty-six or even forty-eight. These represent the elemental, untamed forces of nature that the ritual practitioner seeks to harness.

The two boy servants or dōji (童子) most commonly depicted in Japanese iconographic portrayals are Kiṃkara (矜羯羅童子, Kongara-dōji) and Ceṭaka (吒迦童子, Seitaka-dōji), who also appear as the last two of the list of Acala's eight great dōji. Kiṃkara is depicted as white in color, with his hands joined in respect, while Ceṭaka is red-skinned and holds a vajra in his left hand and a vajra staff in his right hand. The two are said to symbolize both Dharma-essence and ignorance, respectively, and is held to be in charge of good and evil.

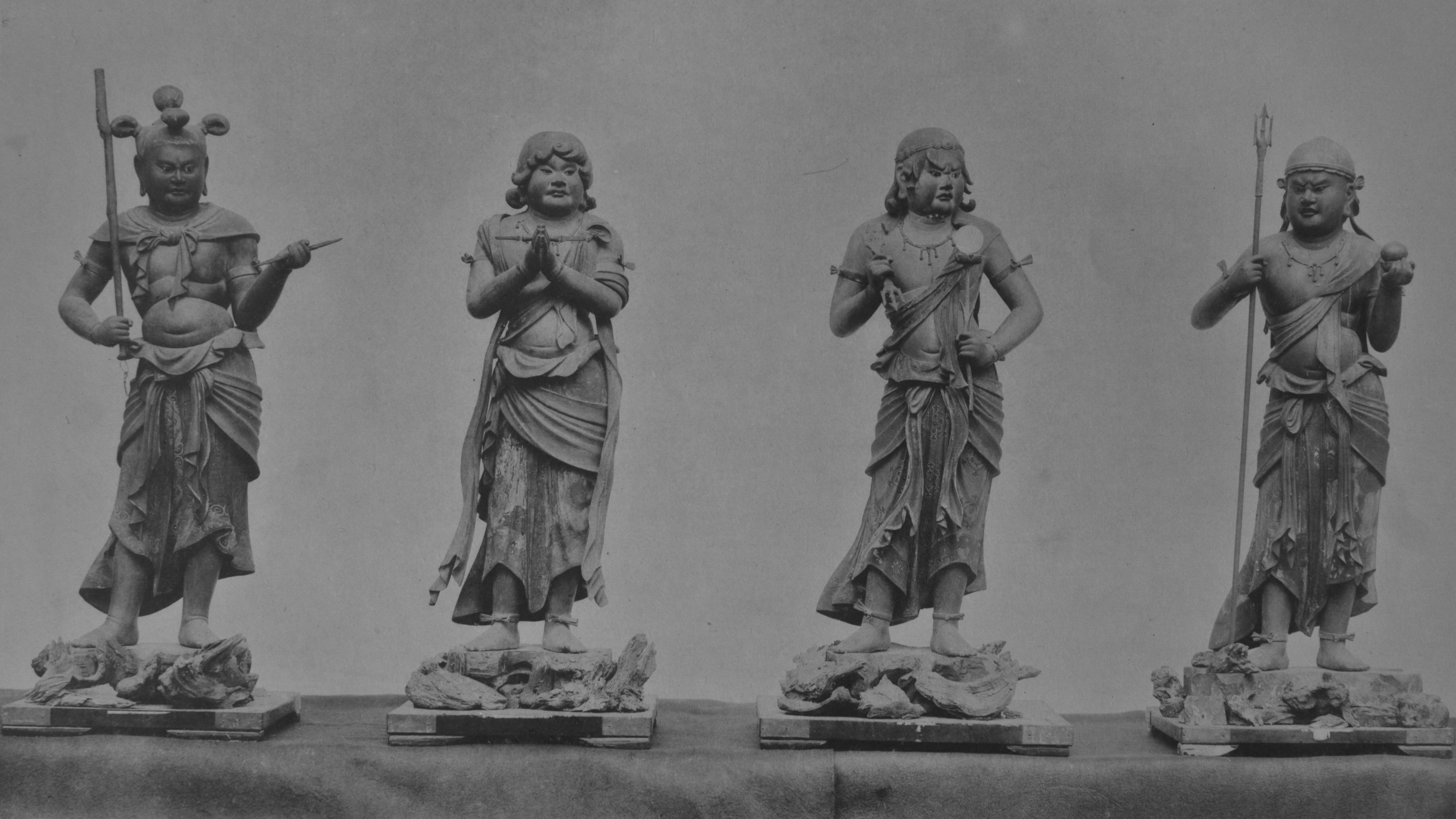
Sculpture of four of Acala's eight acolytes by Unkei (Kongōbu-ji, Mount Kōya). From left: Ceṭaka (Seitaka), Kiṃkara (Kongara), Matijvala (Ekō), and Matisādhu (Eki).

Kiṃkara and Ceṭaka are also sometimes interpreted as transformations or emanations of Acala himself. In a sense, they reflect Acala's original characterization as an attendant of Vairocana; indeed, their servile nature is reflected in their names (Ceṭaka for instance means "slave") and their topknots, the mark of banished people and slaves. In other texts, they are also described as manifestations of Avalokiteśvara (Kannon) and Vajrapāṇi or as transformations of the dragon Kurikara, who is himself sometimes seen as one of Acala's various incarnations.

Two other notable dōji are Matijvala (恵光童子, Ekō-dōji) and Matisādhu (恵喜童子, Eki-dōji), the first two of Acala's eight great acolytes. Matijvala is depicted as white in color and holds a three-pronged vajra in his right hand and a lotus topped with a moon disk on his left, while Matisādhu is red and holds a trident in his right hand and a wish-fulfilling jewel (cintāmaṇi) on his left. The eight acolytes as a whole symbolize the eight directions, with Matijvala and Matisādhu representing east and south, respectively.

== Texts ==
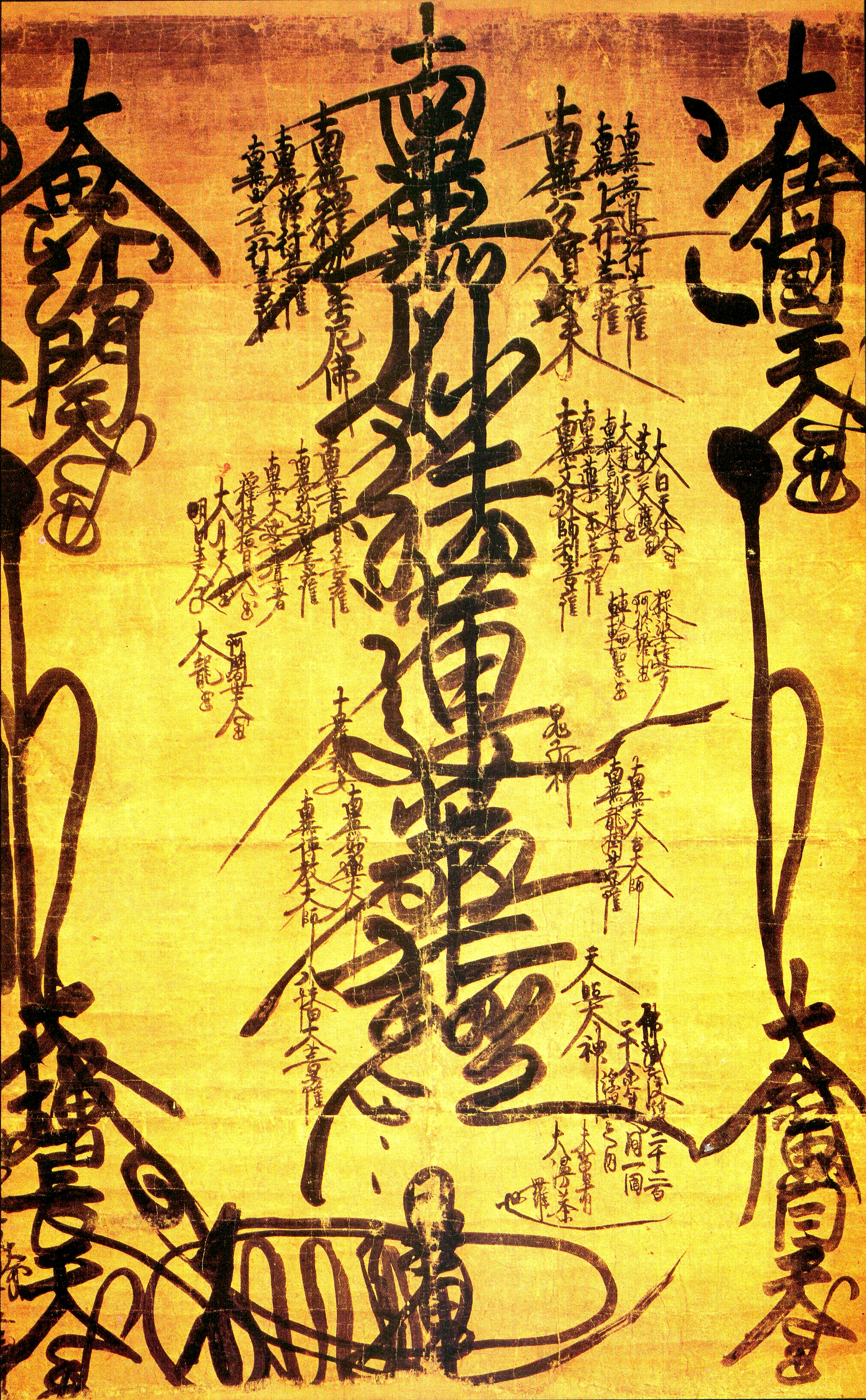
A mandala gohonzon inscribed by Nichiren in 1280. On the gohonzon's right-hand side (in Siddhaṃ script) is hāṃ (हां), Acala's bīja or seed syllable; Rāgarāja's seed syllable, hūṃ (हूं), is on the left.

As noted above, Acala appears in the Amoghapāśakalparāja Sūtra and the Vairocanābhisaṃbodhi Sūtra. As Caṇḍaroṣaṇa or Caṇḍamahāroṣaṇa, he is the primary deity of the Caṇḍamahāroṣaṇa Tantra and is described in the Sādhanamālā.

The Japanese esoteric Buddhist tradition and Shugendō also make use of the following apocryphal sutras on Acala:

- Sūtra of the Great Wrathful King Āryācala's Secret Dhāraṇī (聖無動尊大威怒王秘密陀羅尼経, Shō-Mudō-son daiifunnuō himitsu darani kyō)

A sūtra consisting of a discourse on Acala given by the bodhisattva Vajrasattva (identified here with Samantabhadra) to Mañjuśrī, set in "Vairocana's great assembly." The sutra describes Acala as being identical with the all-pervading dharmakāya, "[having] no fixed abode, but [dwelling] within the hearts of sentient beings" (無其所居、但住衆生心想之中).

- Āryācala Sūtra (仏説聖不動経, Bussetsu Shō-Fudō kyō)

A summarized version of the above sutra. Translated into English, it runs as follows:

At that time, in the great assembly [of Vairocana], there was a great wisdom king.
This great wisdom king possesses great majestic power (大威力, daiiriki).
Having the virtue of great compassion (大悲徳, daihi toku), he appears in a blue-black form.
Having the virtue of great stillness (大定徳, daijō toku), he sits in an adamantine rock.
Having great wisdom (大智慧, daichie), he manifests great flames.
He wields the great sword of wisdom to destroy greed, ignorance and hatred.
He holds the snare of samādhi to bind those who are hard to tame.
Because he is the formless Dharmakāya identical with space, he has no fixed abode;
his only dwelling is within the hearts of sentient beings.
Although the minds and inclinations of sentient beings differ from each other,
in accordance with each one's desires, he bestows blessings (利益, riyaku) and provides whatever is being sought.
At that time, the great assembly, having heard this sūtra, rejoiced greatly, faithfully accepted it, and put it into practice.

To this text is often appended two litanies of the names of Acala's young acolytes (童子, dōji), the 'thirty-six dōji' (三十六童子, sanjuroku dōji) and the 'eight great dōji' (八大童子, hachi daidōji).

- Sūtra on Reverencing the Secret Dhāraṇī of Āryācala (稽首聖無動尊秘密陀羅尼経, Keishu Shō-Mudō-son himitsu darani kyō)

== Bīja and mantra ==
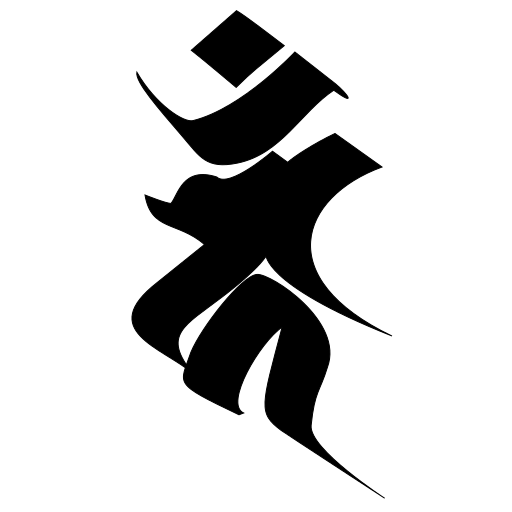
हाँ (hāṃ), Acala's seed syllable (bīja) written in Siddhaṃ script

The bīja or seed syllables used to represent Acala in Japanese Buddhism are hāṃ (हां / हाँ) and hāmmāṃ (हाम्मां / हाम्माँ), the latter being a combination of the two final bīja in his mantra: hāṃ māṃ (हां मां). Hāṃ is sometimes confounded with the similar-looking hūṃ (हूं), prompting some writers to mistakenly identify Acala with other deities. The syllables are written using the Siddham script and is conventionally read as kān (カーン) and kānmān (カーンマーン).

Three mantras of Acala are considered to be the standard in Japan. The most widely known one, derived from the Mahāvairocana Tantra and popularly known as the "Mantra of Compassionate Help" (慈救呪, jikushu or jikuju), goes as follows:

Sanskrit	Shingon pronunciation	Tendai pronunciation	English translation
Namaḥ samanta vajrāṇāṃ caṇḍa-mahāroṣaṇa sphāṭaya hūṃ traka hāṃ māṃ	Nōmaku sanmanda bazarada(n) senda(n) makaroshada sowataya un tarata kan man	Namaku samanda basaranan senda makaroshana sowataya un tarata kan man	Homage to the all-encompassing Vajras! O violent one of great wrath (caṇḍa-mahāroṣaṇa), destroy! hūṃ traka hāṃ māṃ.

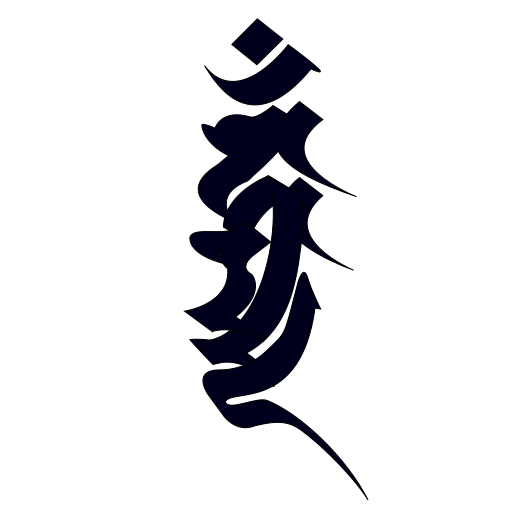
The seed syllable(s) हाम्माँ (hāmmāṃ) in Siddhaṃ script

The "Short Mantra" (小呪, shōshu) of Acala - also found in the Mahāvairocana Tantra - is as follows:

Sanskrit	Shingon pronunciation	Tendai pronunciation	English translation
Namaḥ samanta vajrānāṃ hāṃ	Nōmaku sanmanda bazaradan kan	Namaku samanda basaranan kan	Homage to the all-encompassing Vajras! hāṃ.

The longest of the three is the "Great Mantra" of Acala, also known as the "Fire Realm Mantra" (火界呪, kakaishu / kakaiju):

Sanskrit	Shingon pronunciation	Tendai pronunciation	English translation
Namaḥ sarva-tathāgatebhyaḥ sarva-mukhebhyaḥ sarvathā traṭ caṇḍa-mahāroṣaṇa khaṃ khā he khā he (or khāhi khāhi) sarva-vighnaṃ hūṃ traṭ hāṃ māṃ	Nōmaku saraba tatagyateibyaku saraba bokkeibyaku sarabata tarata senda makaroshada ken gyaki gyaki saraba bikin(n)an un tarata kan man	Namaku saruba tatagyateibyaku saruba mokkeibyaku sarubata tarata senda makaroshana ken gyaki gyaki saruba bikinan un tarata kan man	Homage to all Tathāgatas, the omnipresent doors, who are in all directions! traṭ. O violent one of great wrath! khaṃ. Root out, root out every obstacle! hūm traṭ hām mām.

Another mantra associated with the deity is Oṃ caṇḍa-mahāroṣaṇa hūṃ phaṭ, found in the Siddhaikavīra Tantra. The text describes it as the "king of mantras" that dispels all evil and grants "whatever the follower of Mantrayāna desires".

== Worship ==
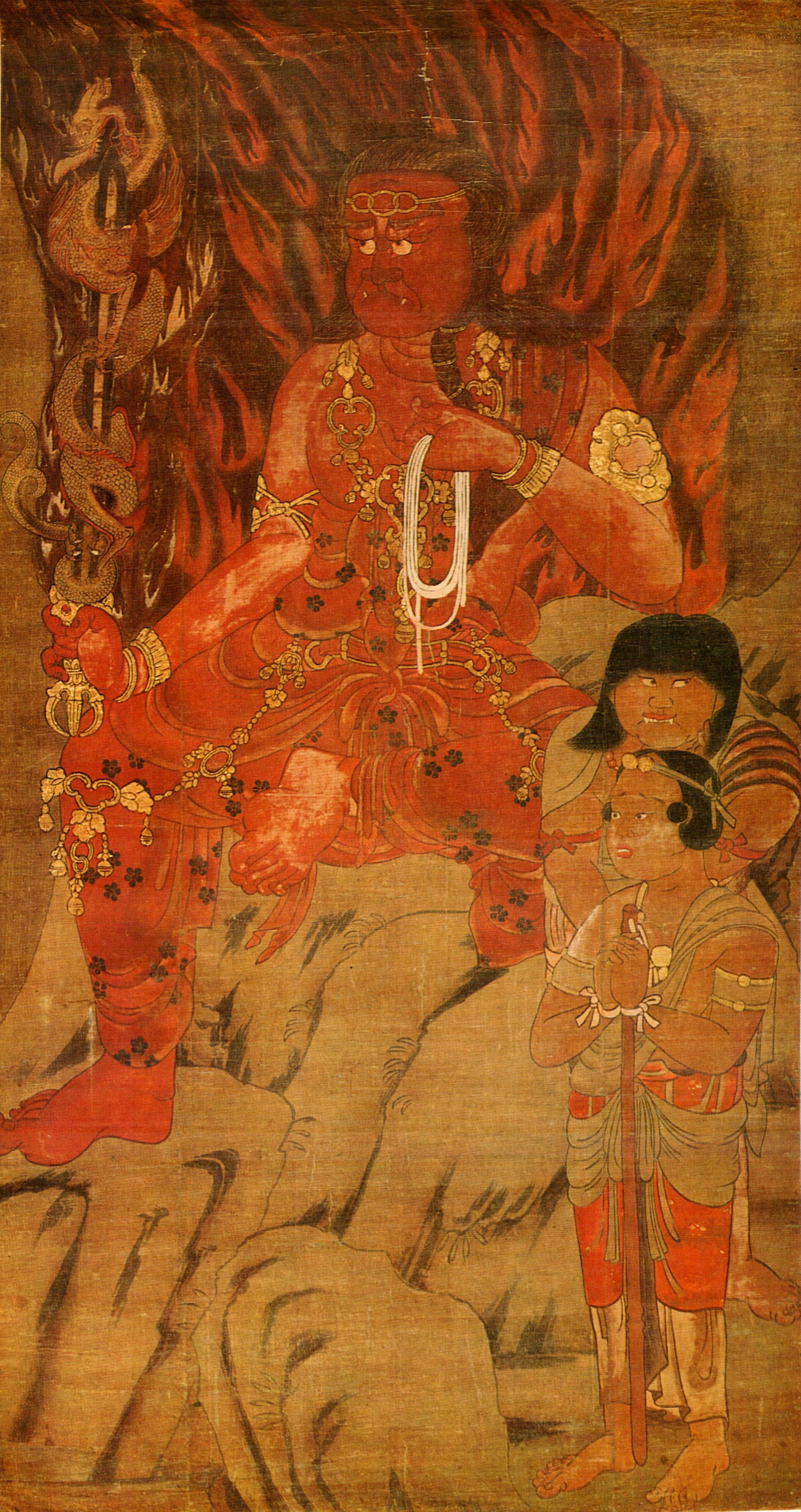
Painting of Red Acala (Aka-Fudō) in Myōō-in temple on Mount Kōya, traditionally attributed to Heian period monk Enchin

=== Japan ===
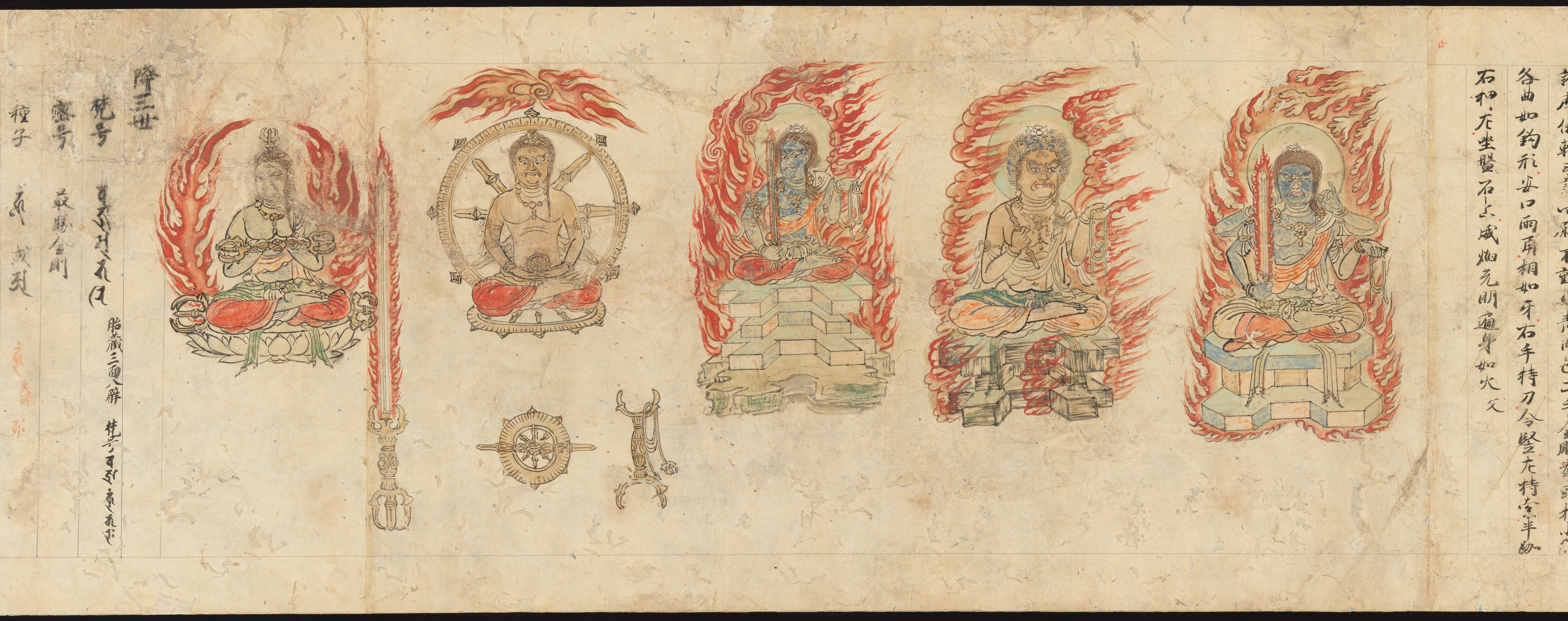
Five variant depictions of Acala, from a 12th century handscroll

Fudō Myōō (Acala), was never popular in Indian, Tibetan or even Chinese Buddhism, but in Japan it became the object of a flourishing cult with esoteric overtones.

The cult of Acala was first brought to Japan by the esoteric master Kūkai, the founder of the Shingon school, and his successors, where it developed as part of the growing popularity of rituals for the protection of the state. While Acala was at first simply regarded as the primus inter pares among the five wisdom kings, he gradually became a focus of worship in his own right, subsuming characteristics of the other four vidyarājas (who came to be perceived as emanating from him), and became installed as the main deity (honzon) at many temples and outdoor shrines.

Acala, as a powerful vanquisher of evil, was regarded both as a protector of the imperial court and the nation as a whole (in which capacity he was invoked during state-sponsored rituals) and the personal guardian of ritual practitioners. Many eminent Buddhist priests like Kūkai, Kakuban, Ennin, Enchin, and Sōō worshiped Acala as their patron deity, and stories of how he miraculously rescued his devotees in times of danger were widely circulated.

At temples dedicated to Acala, priests perform the Fudō-hō (不動法), or ritual service to enlist the deity's power of purification to benefit the faithful. This rite routinely involves the use of the Homa ritual (護摩, goma) as a purification tool.

Lay persons or monks in yamabushi gear who go into rigorous training outdoors in the mountains often pray to small Acala statues or portable talismans that serve as his honzon. This element of yamabushi training, known as Shugendō, predates the introduction of Acala to Japan. At this time, figures such as Zaō Gongen (蔵王権現), who appeared before the sect's founder, En no Gyōja, or Vairocana, were commonly worshiped. Once Acala was added to list of deities typically enshrined by the yamabushi monks, his images were either portable, or installed in hokora (outdoor shrines). These statues would often be placed near waterfalls (a common training ground), deep in the mountains and in caves.

The daimyo Takeda Shingen is known to have taken Fudō Myōō as his patron (particularly when he transitioned to being a lay monk in his later years), and has commissioned a statue of Fudō that is supposedly modelled after his face.

Acala also tops the list of Thirteen Buddhas. Thus Shingon Buddhist mourners assign Fudō to the first seven days of service. The first week is an important observance, but perhaps not as much as the observance of "seven times seven days" (i.e. 49 days) signifying the end of the "intermediate state" (bardo).

Literature on Shingon Buddhist ritual will explain that Sanskrit "seed syllables", mantras and mudras are attendant to each of the Buddhas for each observance period. But the scholarly consensus seems to be that invocation of the "Thirteen Buddhas" had evolved later, around the 14th century and became widespread by the following century, so it is doubtful that this practice was part of Kūkai's original teachings.

=== China ===
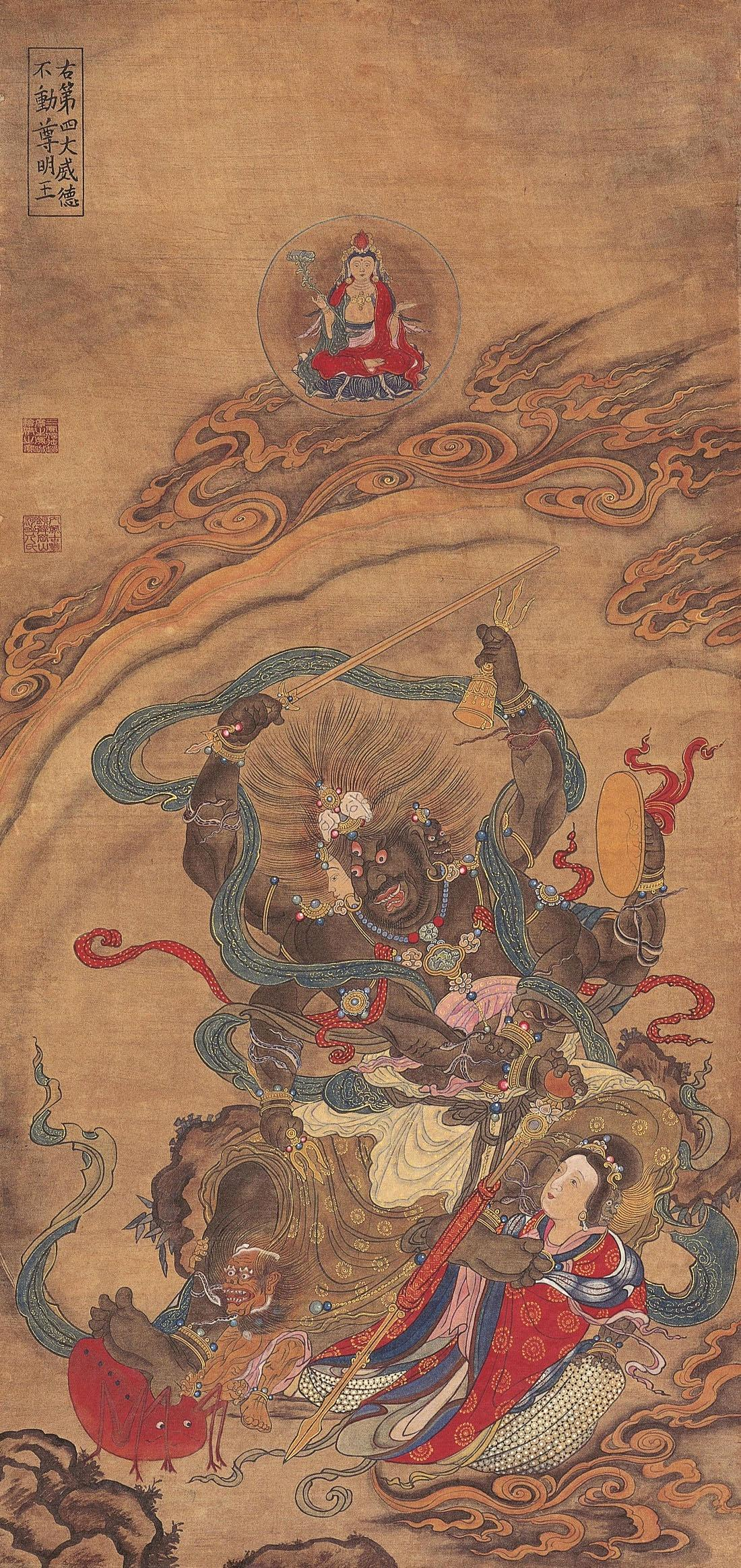
Ming dynasty (1368 - 1644) Shuilu ritual painting of Acala (Budong Mingwang), one out of a set depicting the Ten Wisdom Kings, at Baoning Temple^{[zh]} in Shanxi, China

Budong Mingwang (Acala) worship in China was first introduced into China during the Tang dynasty after the translation of esoteric tantras associated with him by monks such as Amoghavajra and Vajrabodhi. Iconography of Acala has been depicted in temples and grottoes from the Tang through to contemporaneous times, usually as part of a set depicting the Eight Wisdom Kings or Ten Wisdom Kings. He has also commonly been depicted in Shuilu ritual paintings, which are a style of traditional Chinese painting depicting figures in Buddhist cosmology that are used during the eponymous Chinese Buddhist Shuilu Fahui ceremony where these figures are invoked.

In modern times, he continues to be regularly invoked during Chinese Buddhist rituals with esoteric elements, such as the Shuilu Fahui ceremony, along with the other Wisdom Kings where they are given offerings and intreated to expel evil from the ritual platform. He is also revered as one of the eight Buddhist guardians of the Chinese zodiac and specifically considered to be the protector of those born in the year of the Rooster.

Tang dynasty statues of Acala, now kept at Forest of Steles, Beilin Stone Museum in Xi'an, Shaanxi Province, China.

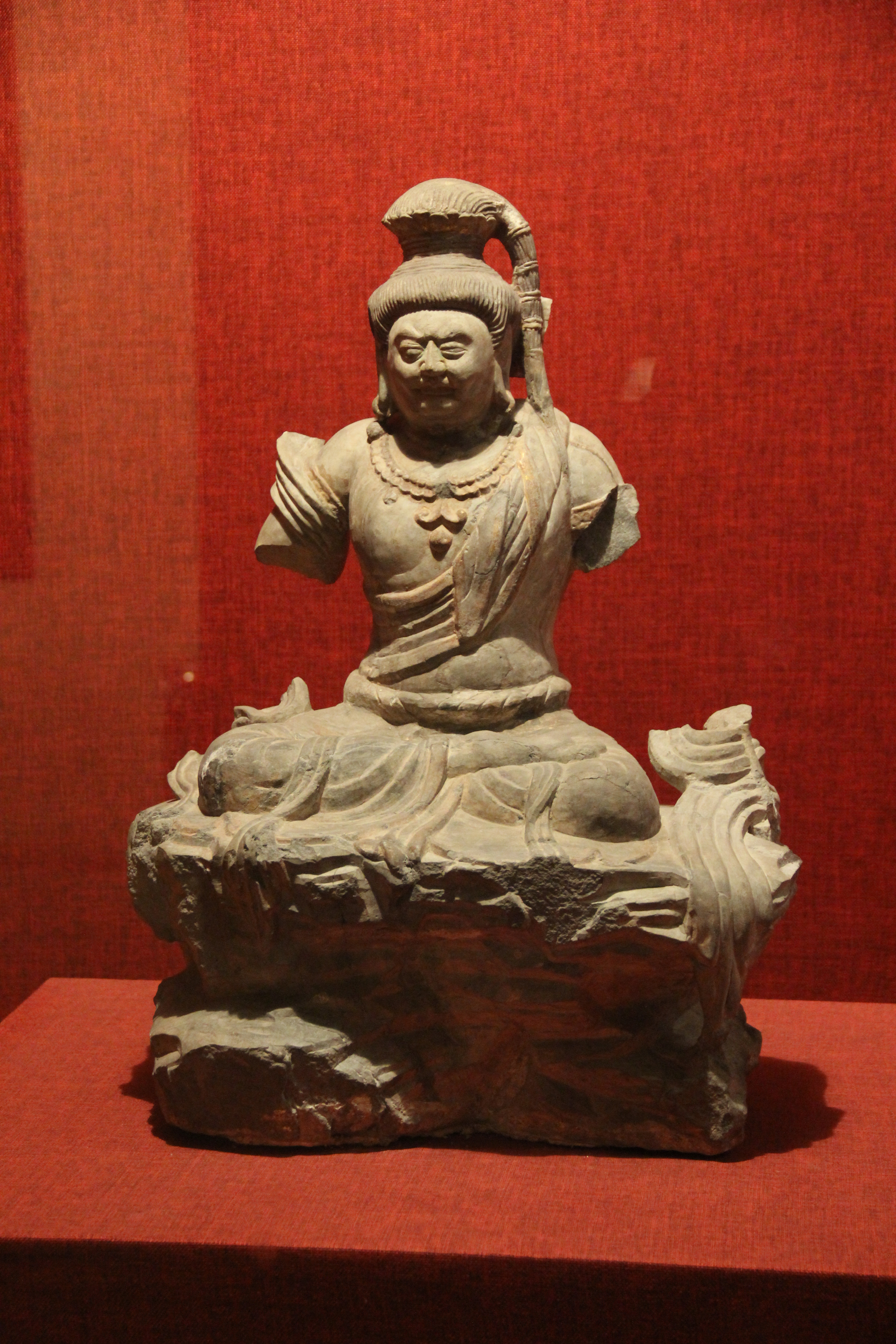

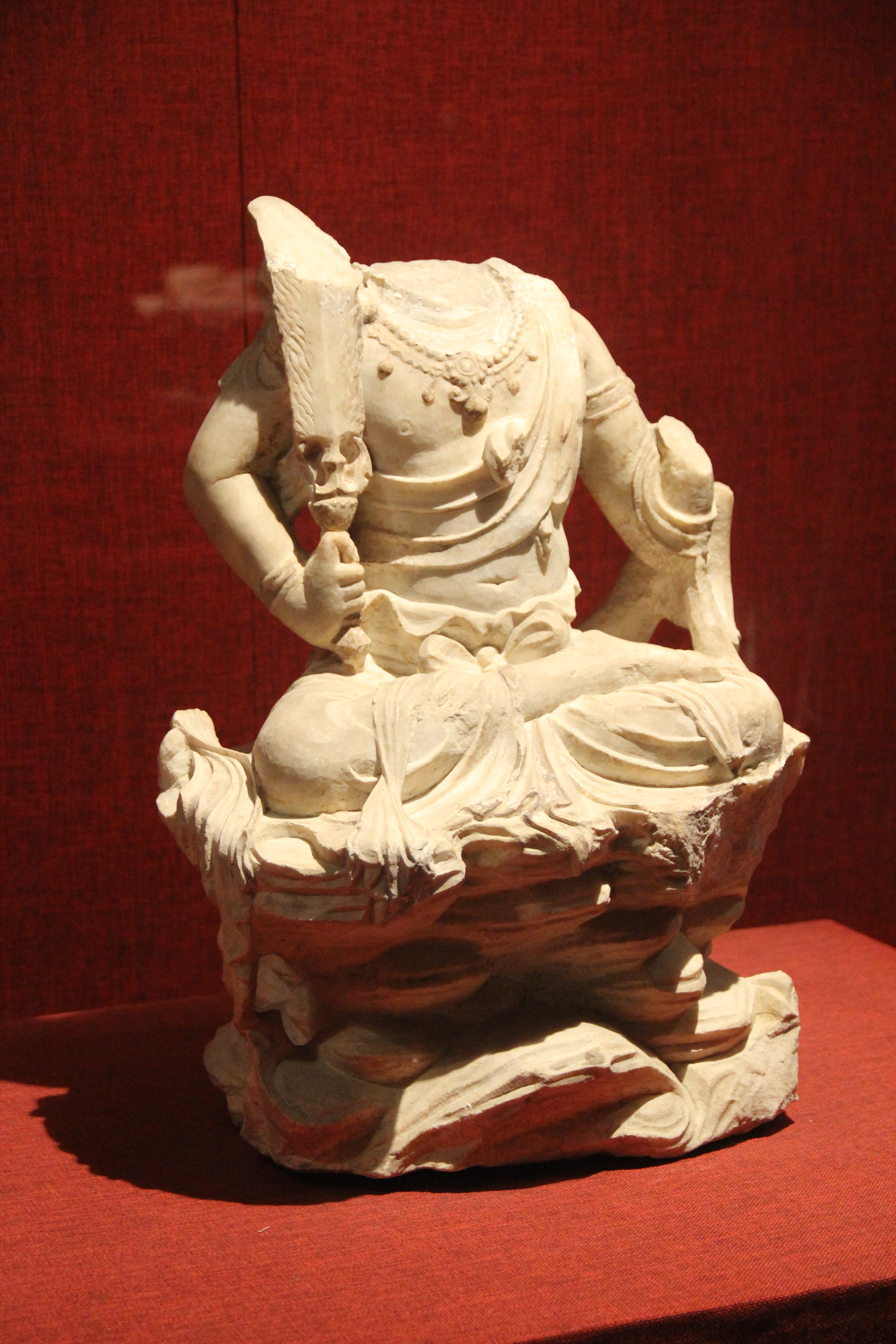

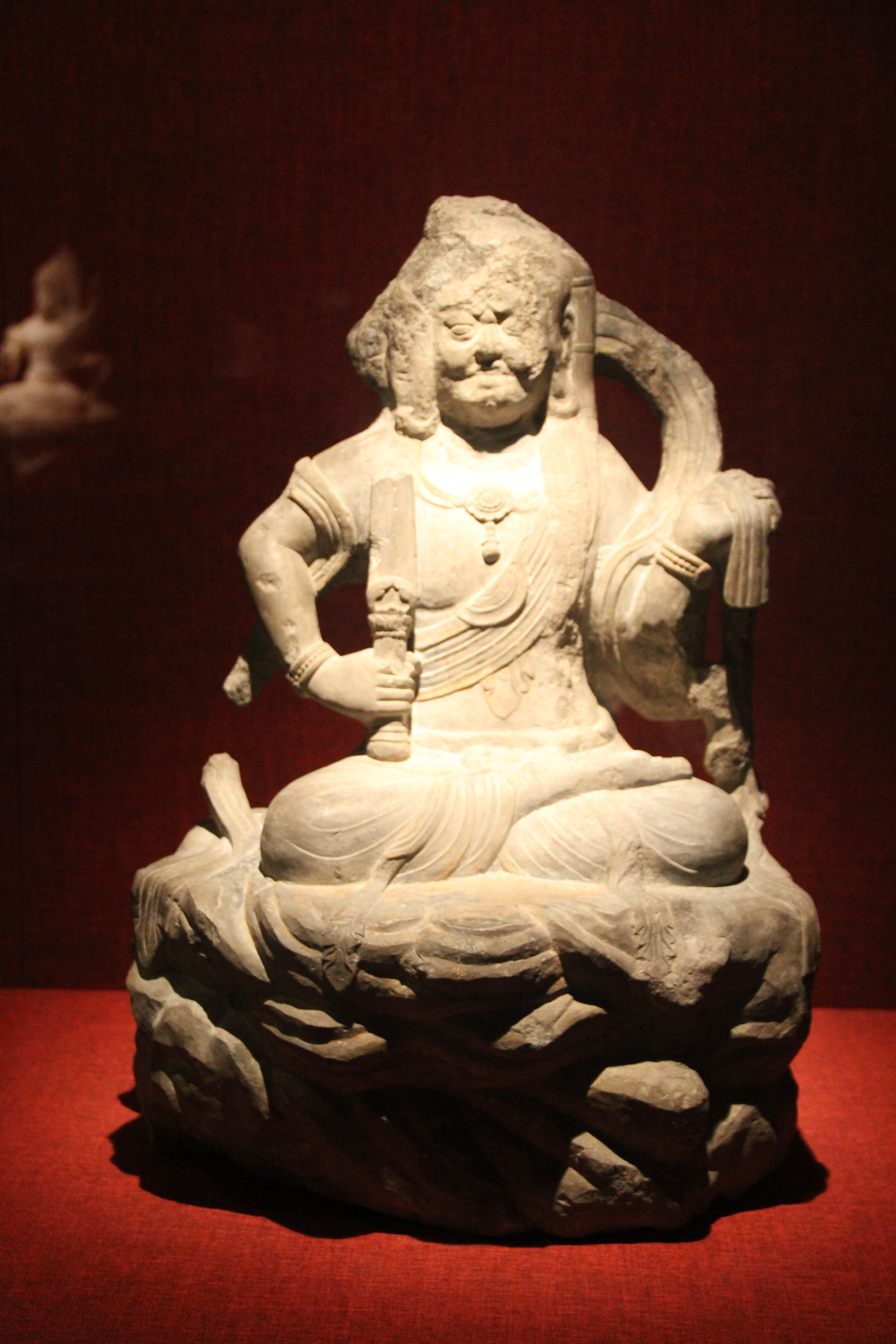

== In popular culture ==
- Gary Snyder's 1969 poem Smokey the Bear Sutra portrays Smokey Bear (the mascot of the U.S. Forest Service) as an incarnation of Vairocana (the "Great Sun Buddha") in a similar vein as Acala. Indeed, Acala's Mantra of Compassionate Help is presented in the text as Smokey's "great mantra."
- Sailor Mars from the Sailor Moon series invokes Acala through the Sanskrit chant of the Mantra of Compassionate Help during her "Fire Soul Bird" attack. Acala is flashed multiple times as a shadowed figure in flames, consistent with Japanese iconography, and in line with Sailor Mars's element of fire.

== Gallery ==
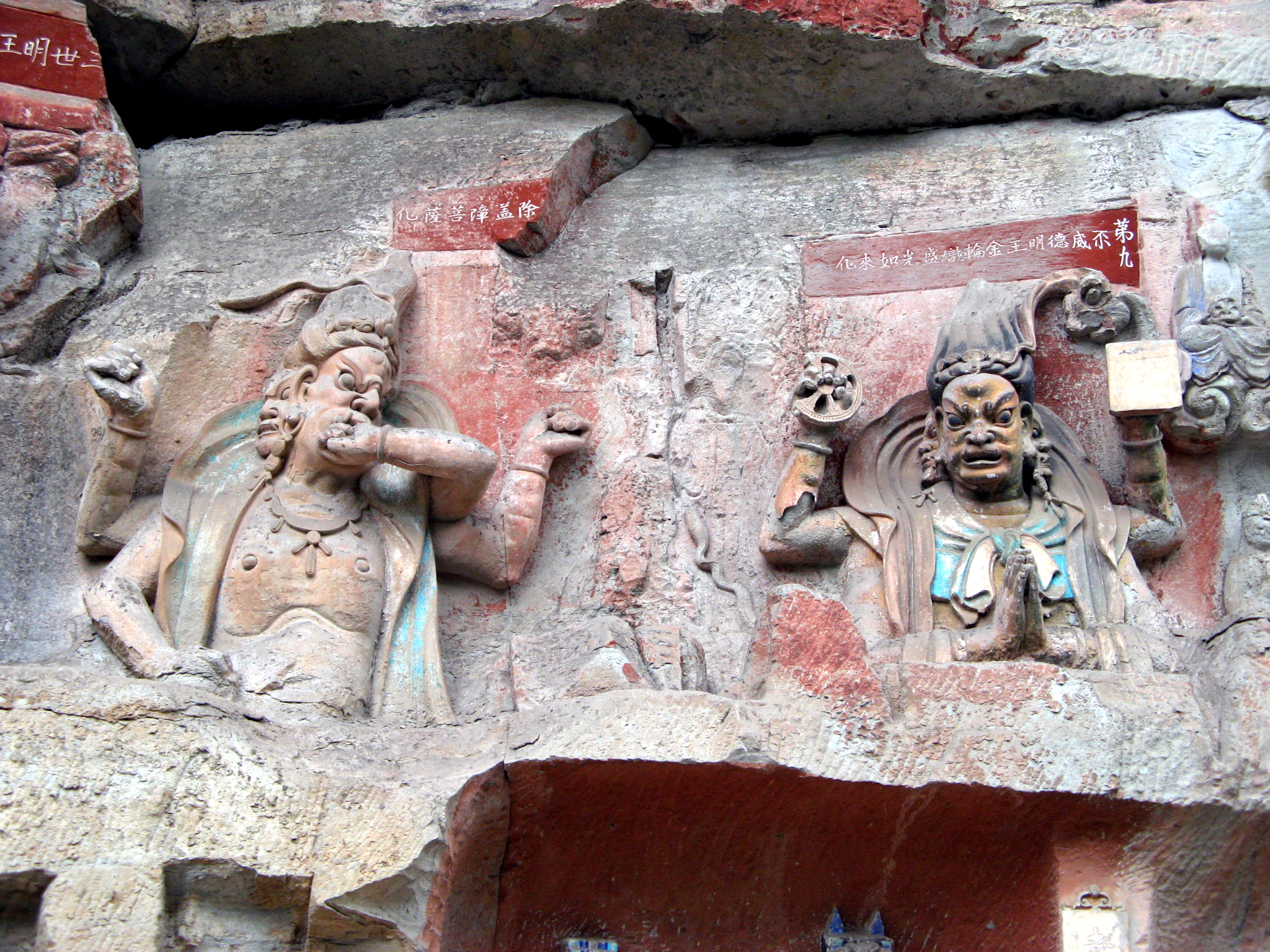
12th century Song dynasty statues of Acala (left) and Yamantaka (right) at the Dazu Rock Carvings in Chongqing, China.

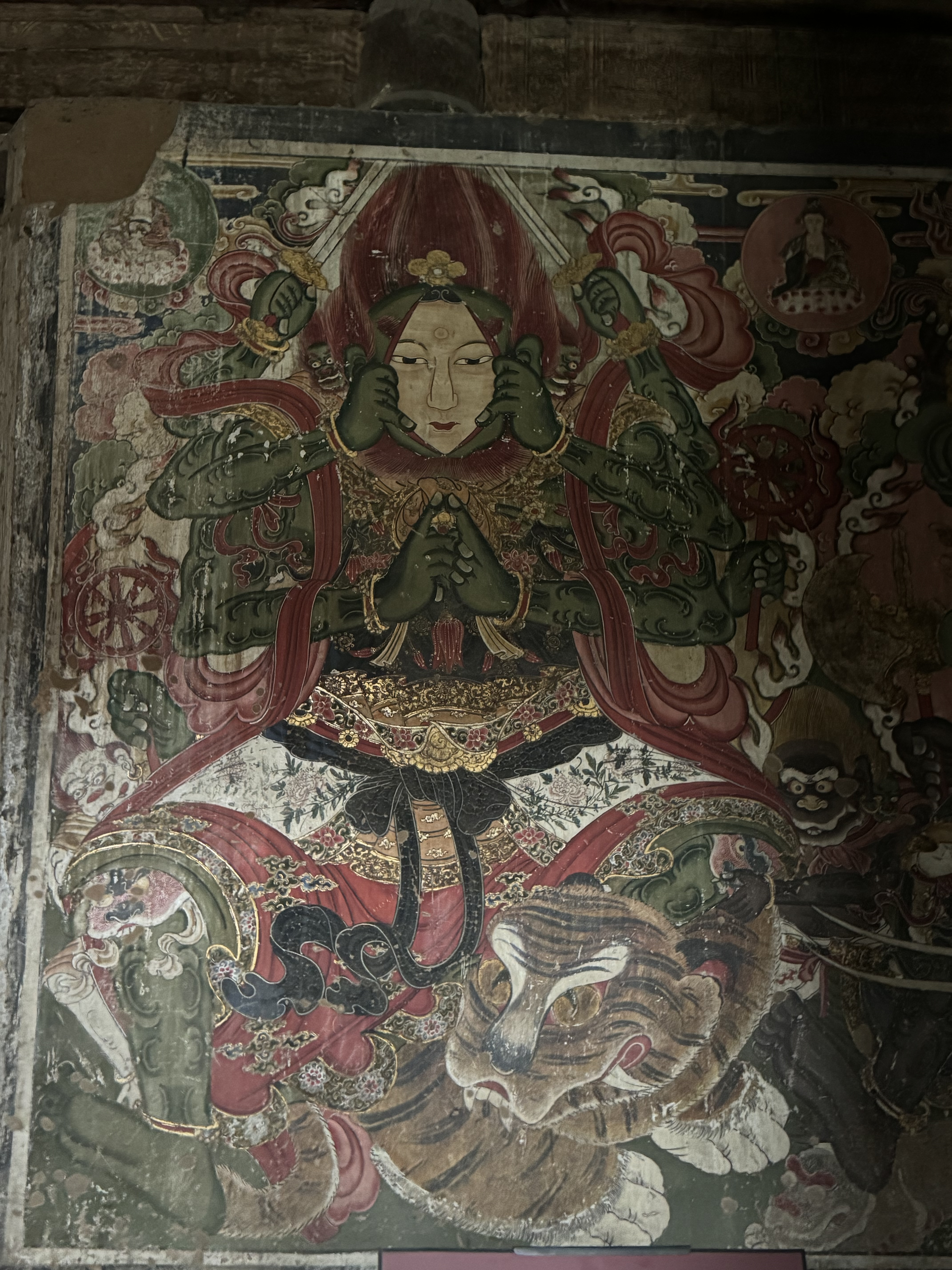
Ming dynasty(1368-1644) mural of Acala, one out of a set depicting the Ten Wisdom Kings, in Yong'an Temple^{[zh]} in Hunyuan, Shanxi, China

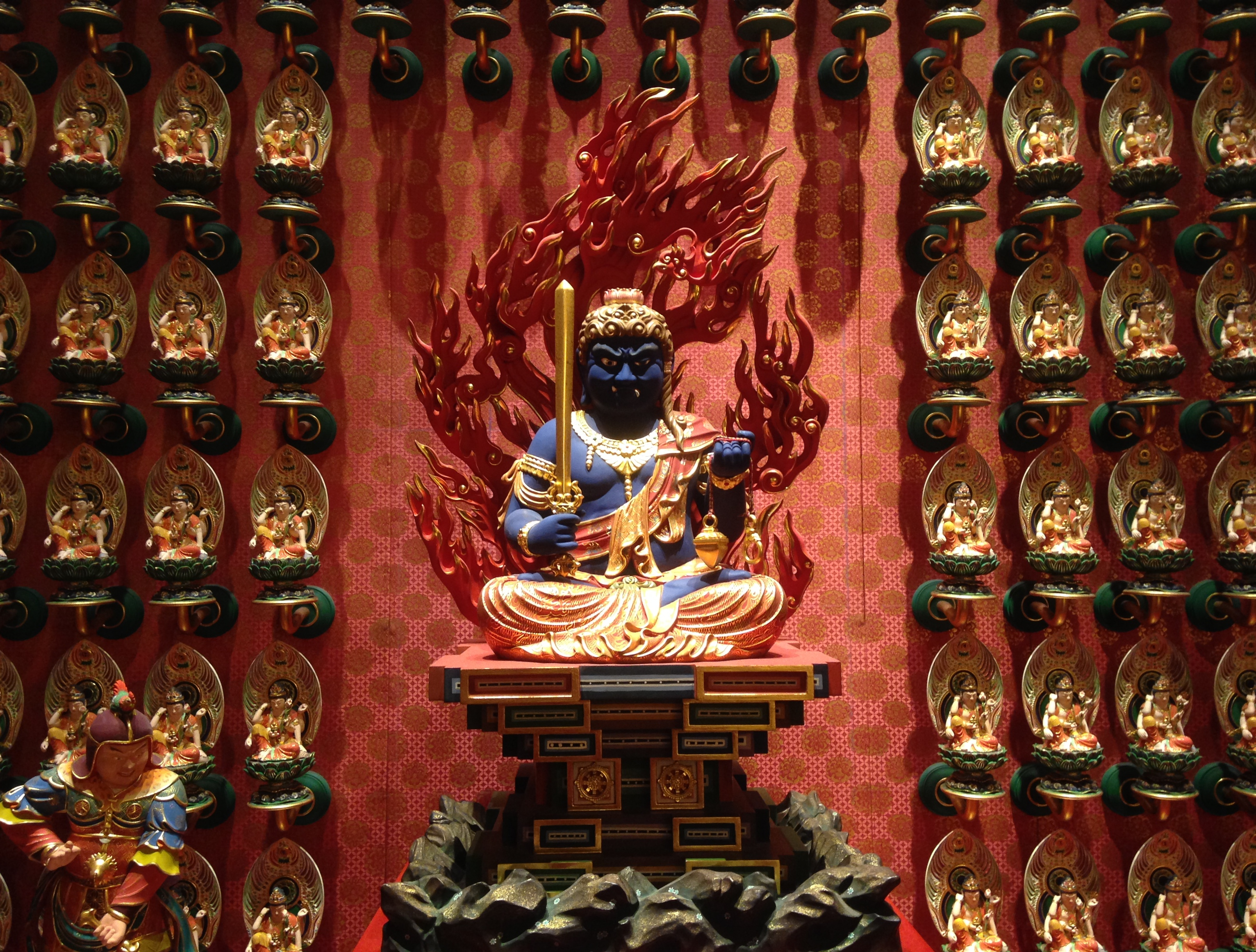
Acala (不動明王; Bùdòng míngwáng) at Buddha Tooth Relic Temple and Museum (Chinatown, Singapore).

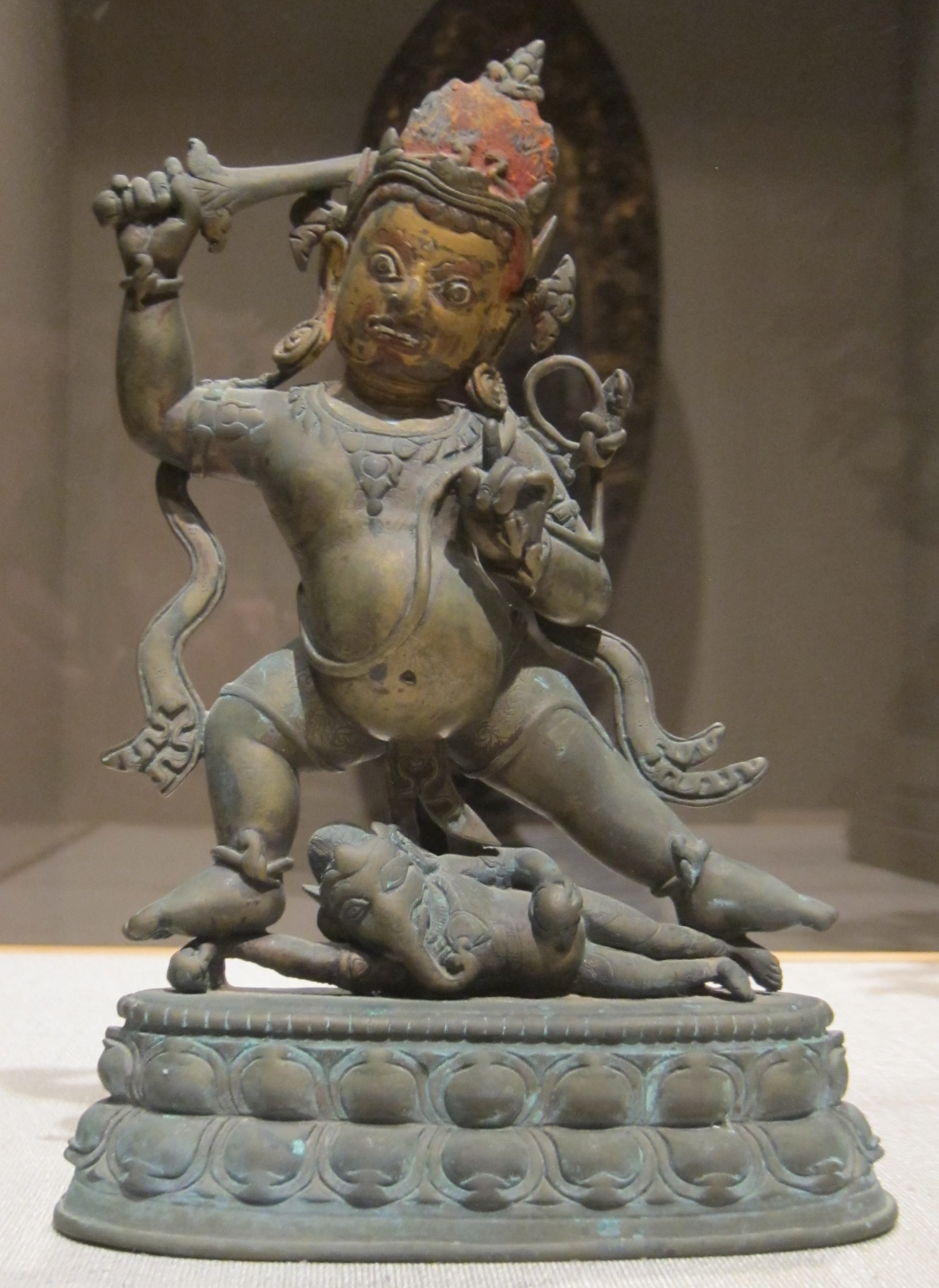
Gilt bronze statue from Tibet, 15th-16th century, Honolulu Museum of Art

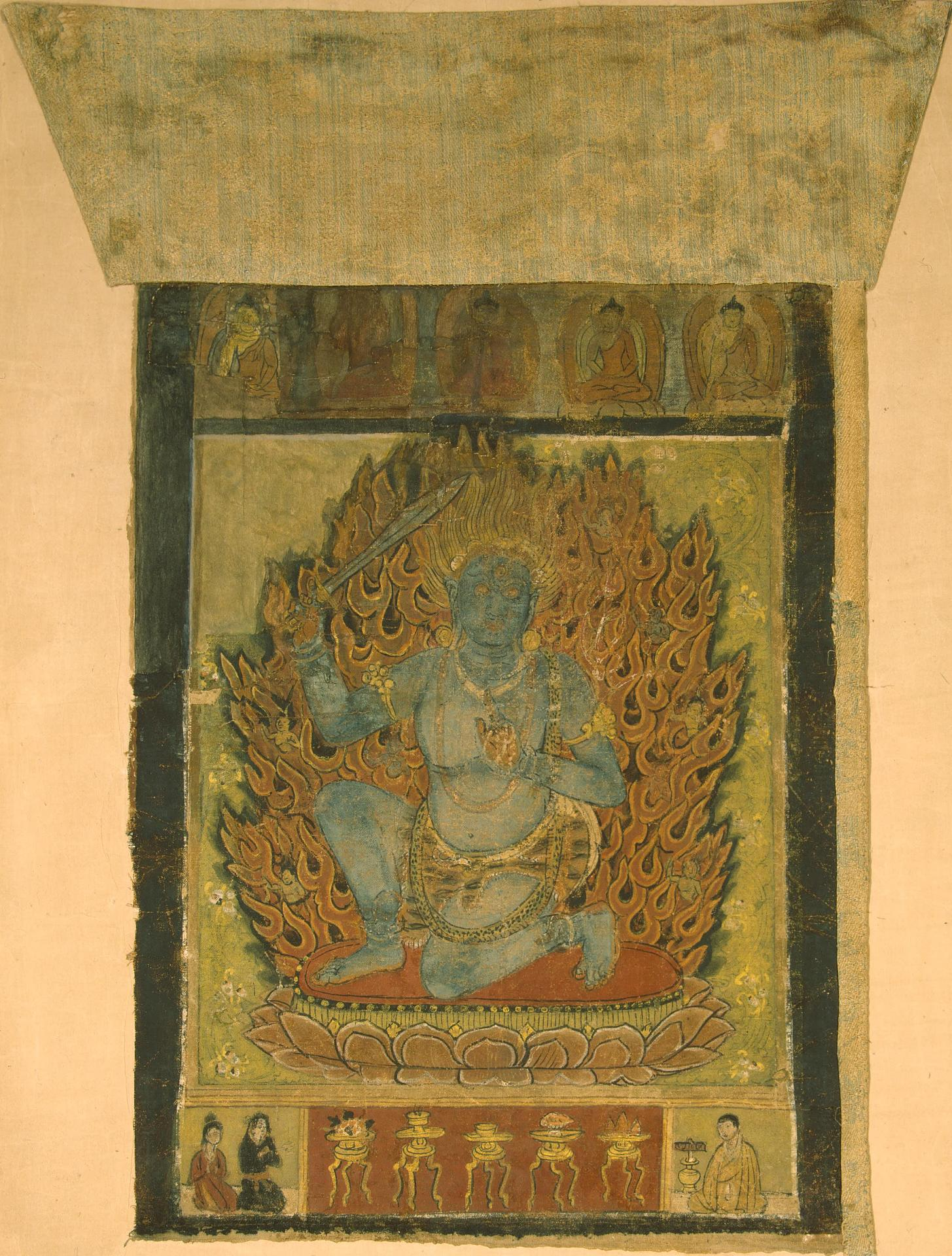
Thangka from Khara-Khoto, Western Xia, 13th century, Hermitage Museum

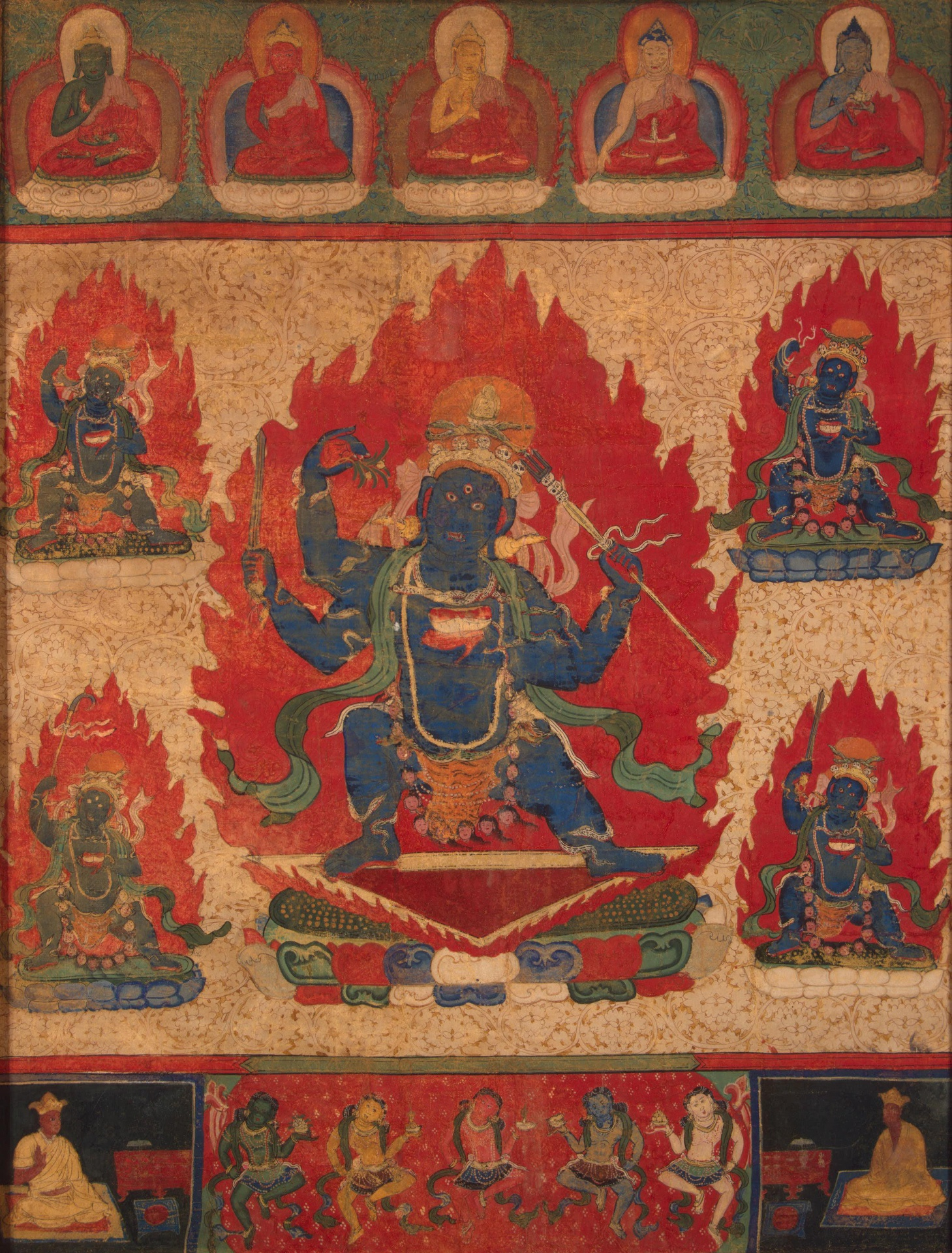
Thangka depicting four-armed Acala, from Khara-Khoto, 13th-14th century

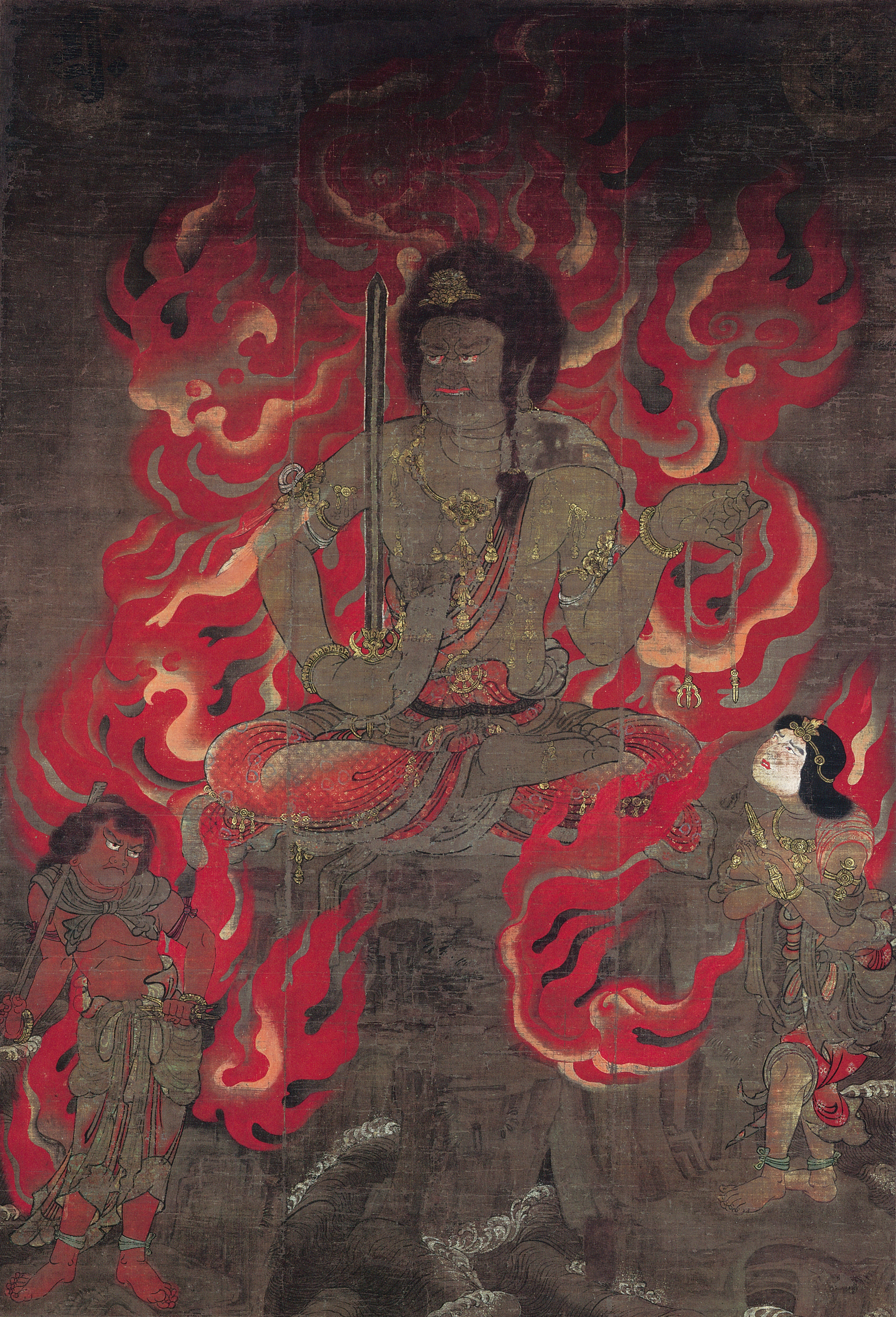
Kamakura period painting at Daigo-ji, Kyoto showing Acala with Kiṃkara and Ceṭaka

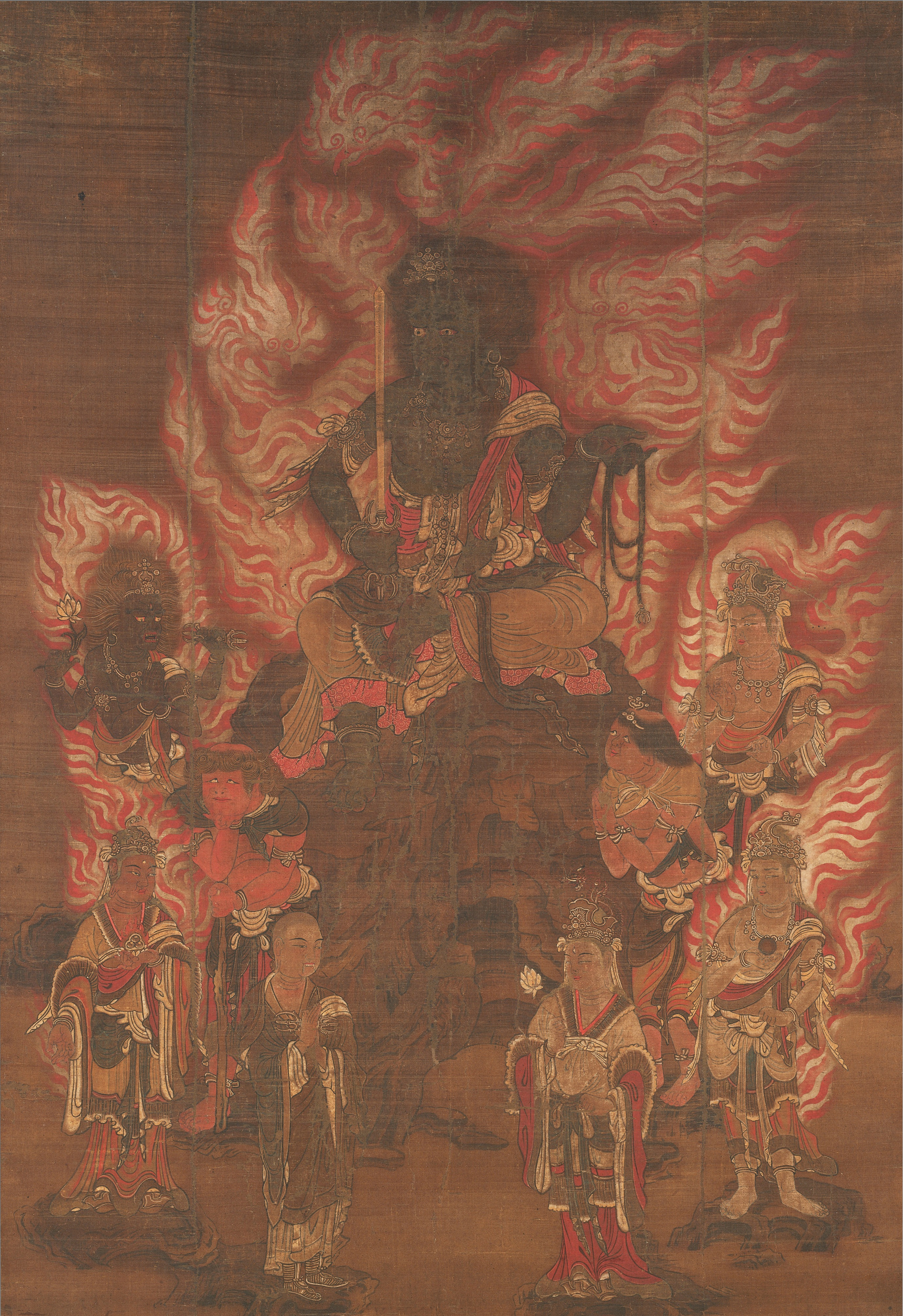
Acala with eight acolytes, Kamakura period, Nara National Museum

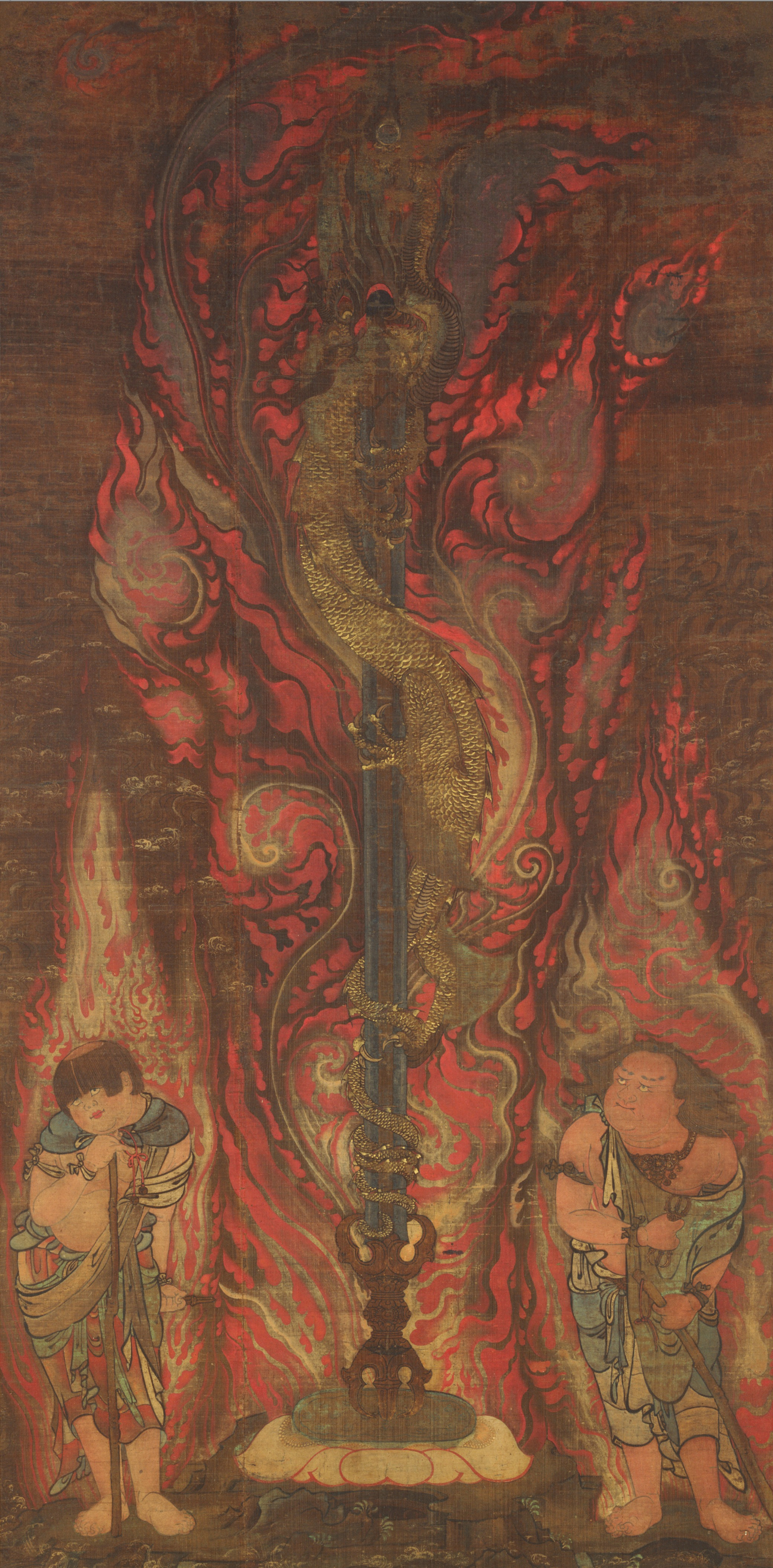
The Kurikara sword flanked by Kiṃkara and Ceṭaka, Kamakura period, Nara National Museum

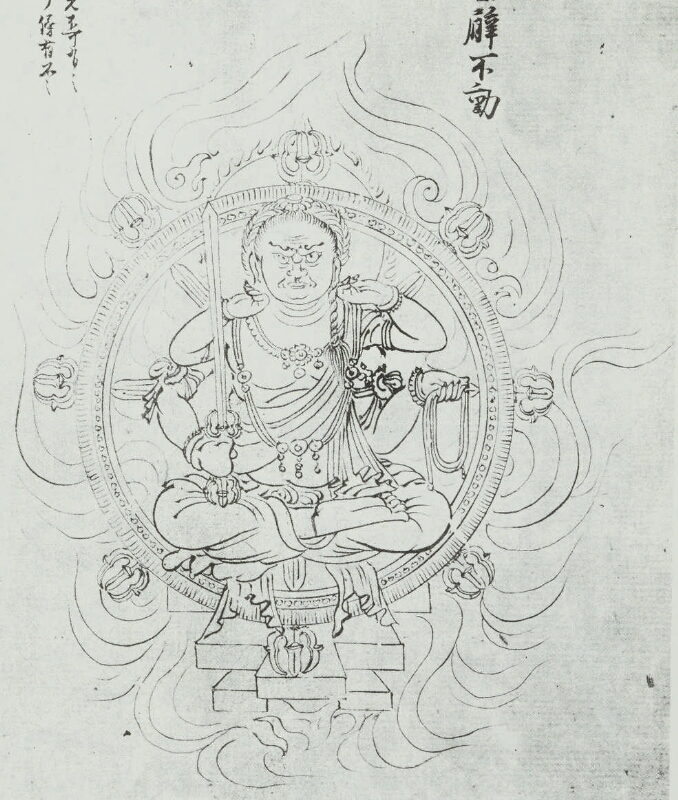
Drawing of four-armed Acala, from the Fudō Giki (1245)

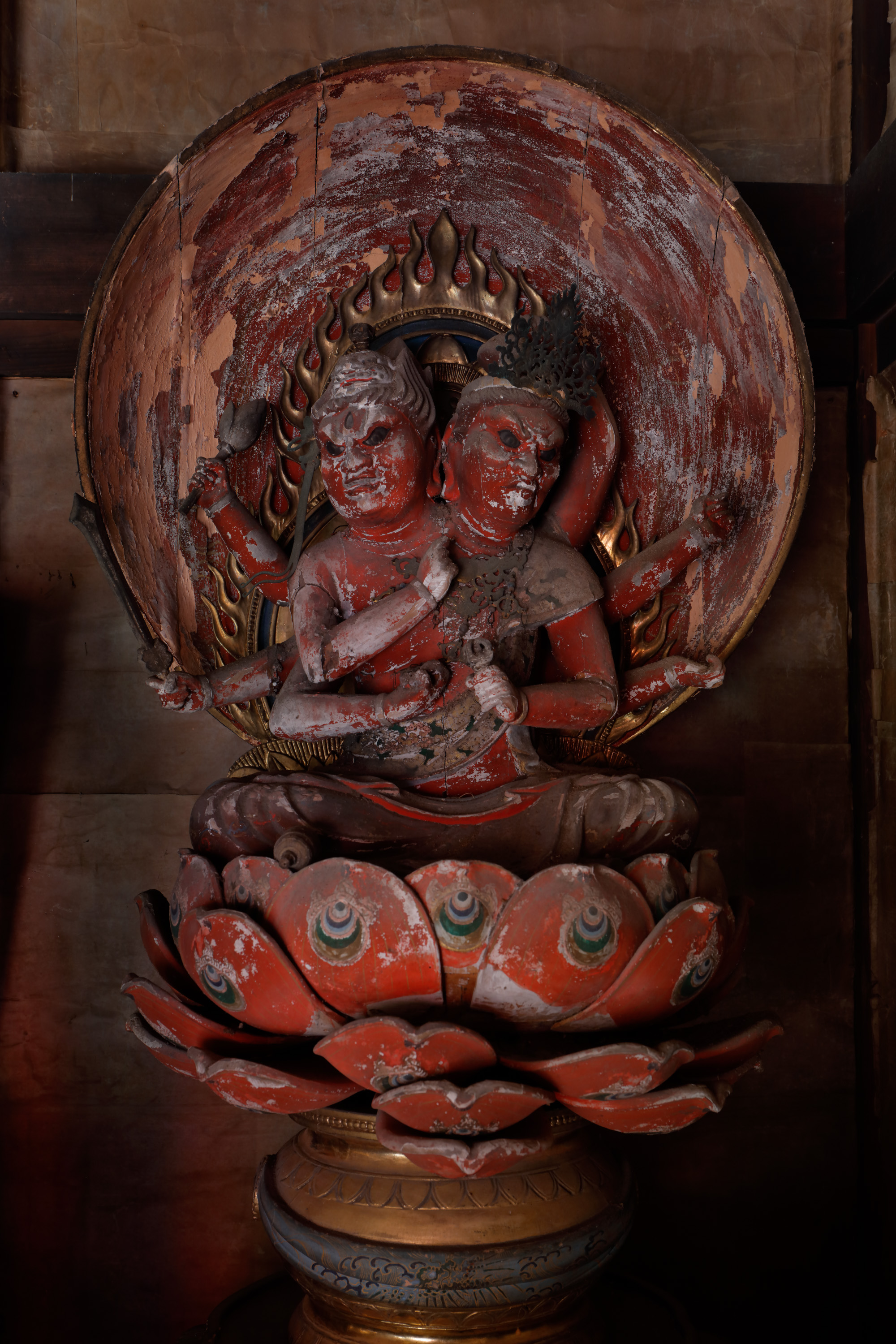
Statue of Two-Headed Rāgarāja, the combined form of Acala and Rāgarāja, at Hokke-ji (Mitahora Kōbō) in Gifu

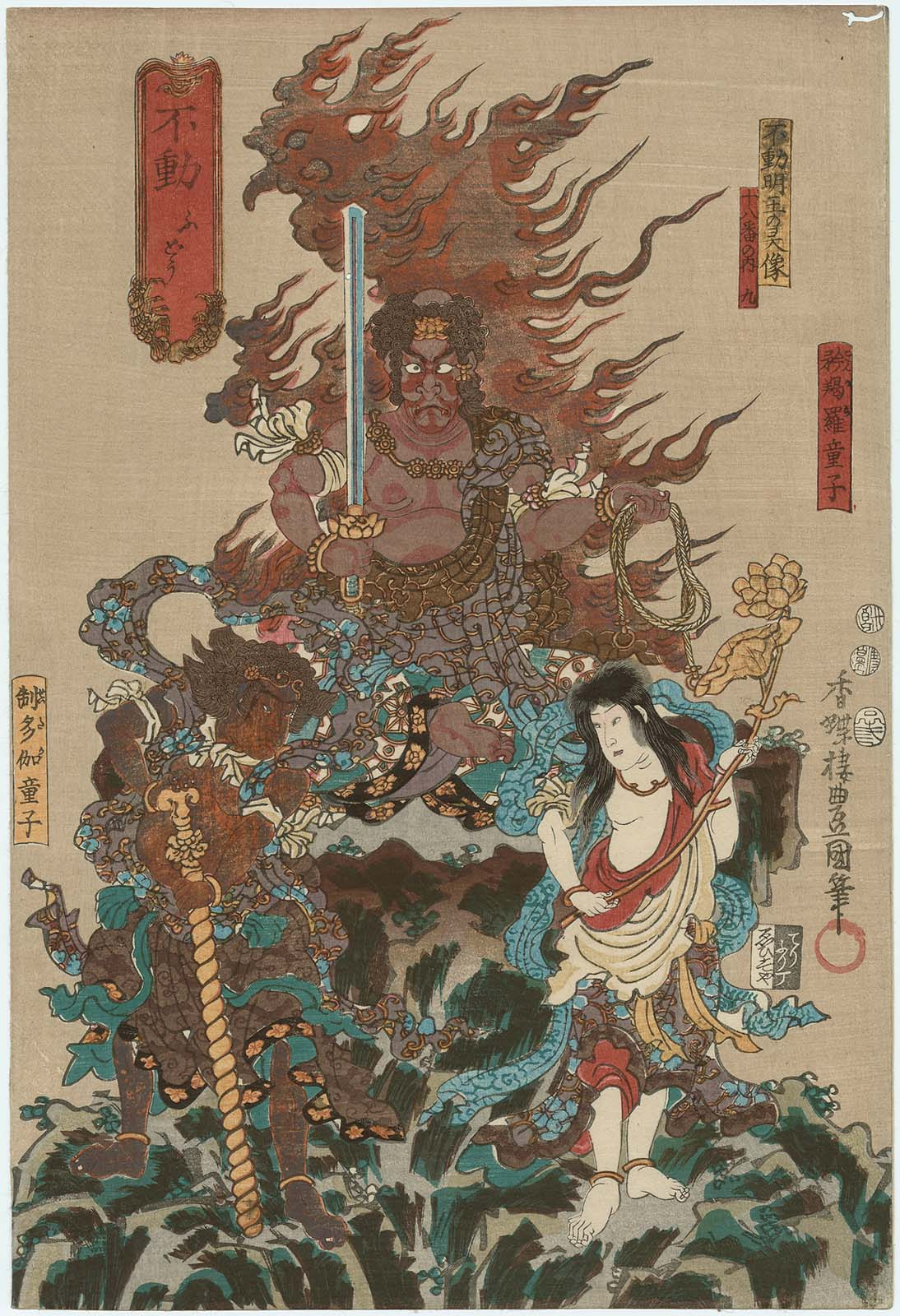
Kabuki actor Ichikawa Ebizō V as Acala, by Utagawa Kunisada

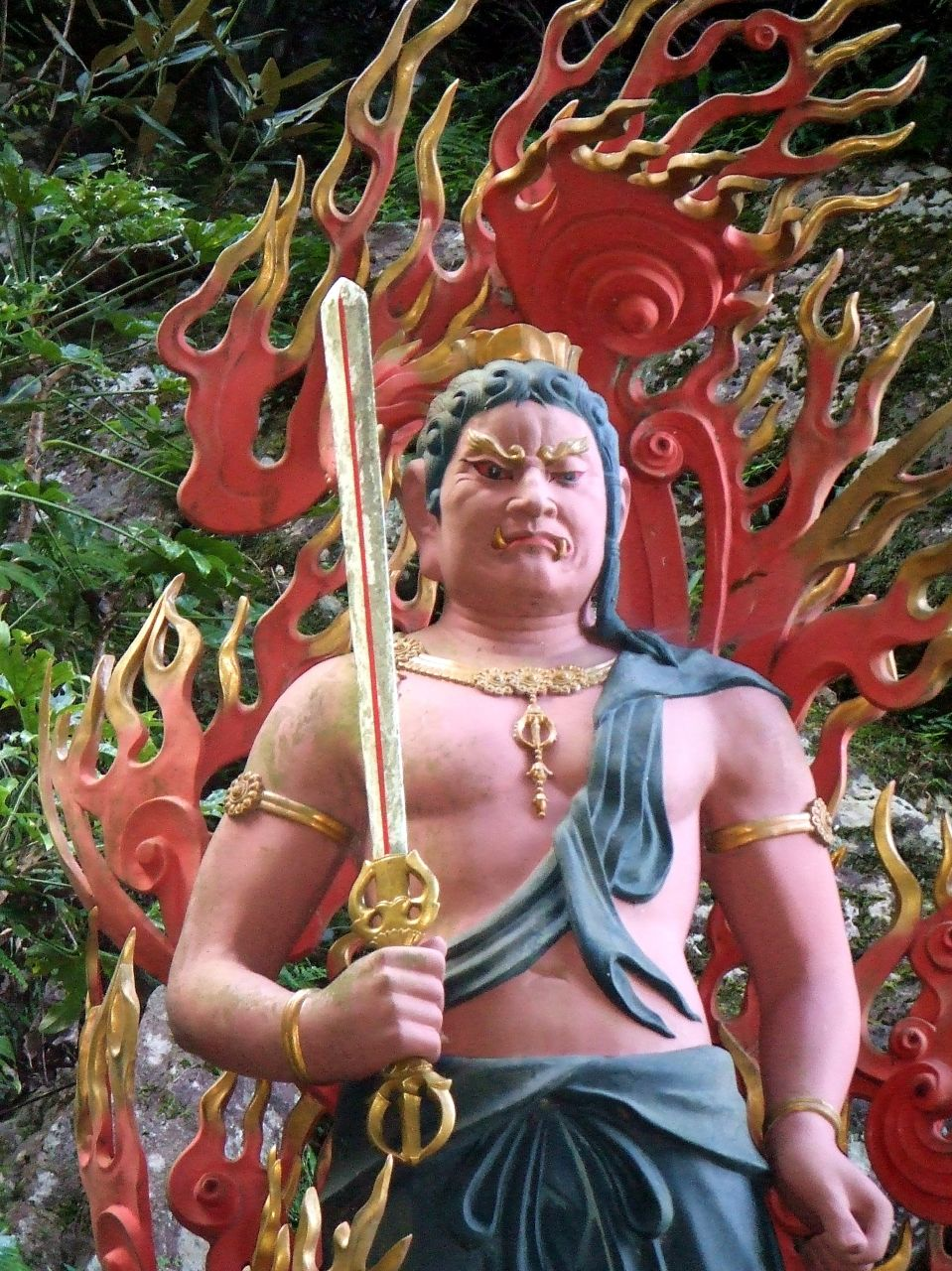
Red-skinned Acala at Kōnomine-ji, Yasuda, Kōchi Prefecture

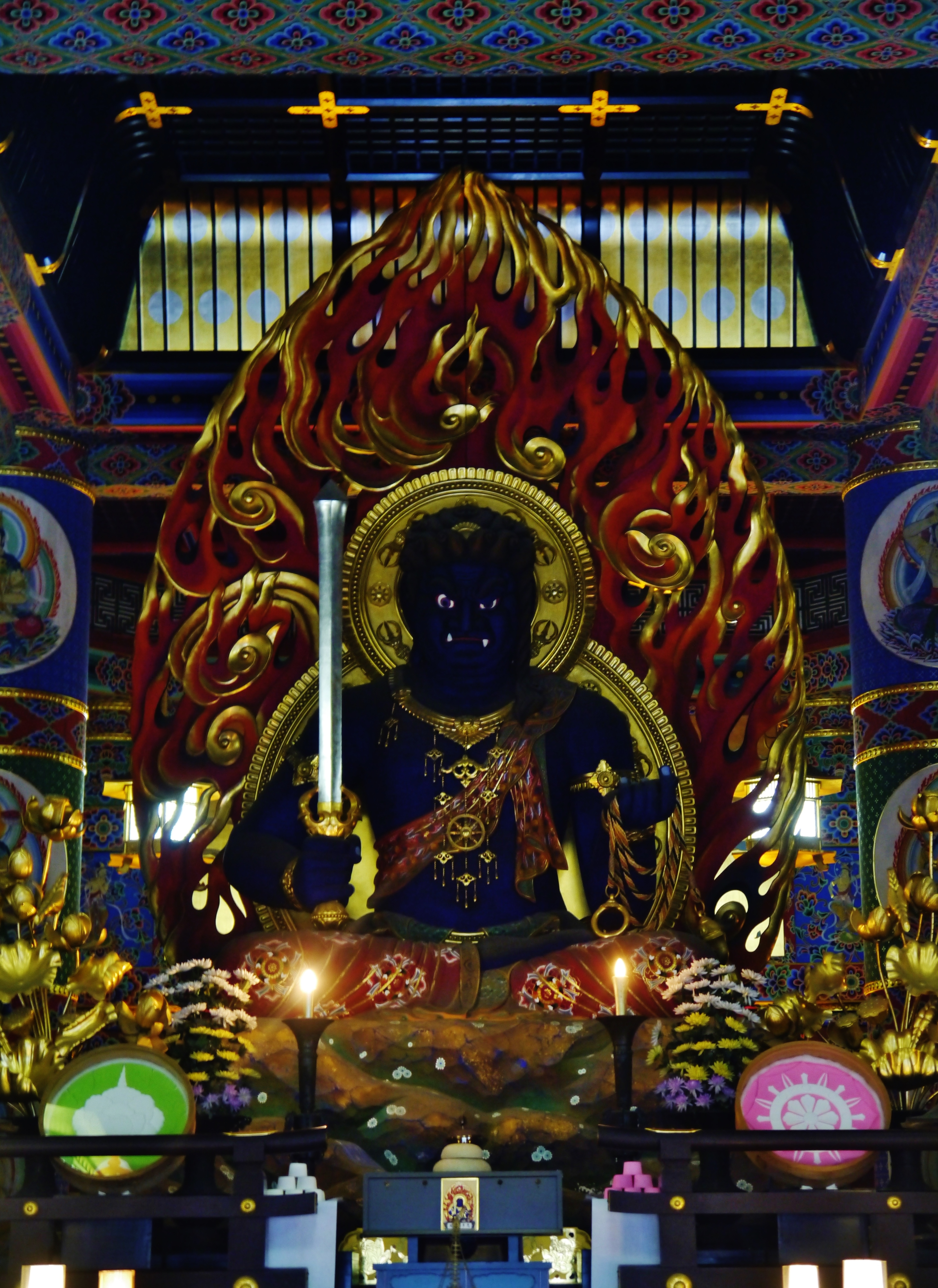
Statue at the Great Peace Pagoda in Shinshō-ji, Narita, Chiba Prefecture

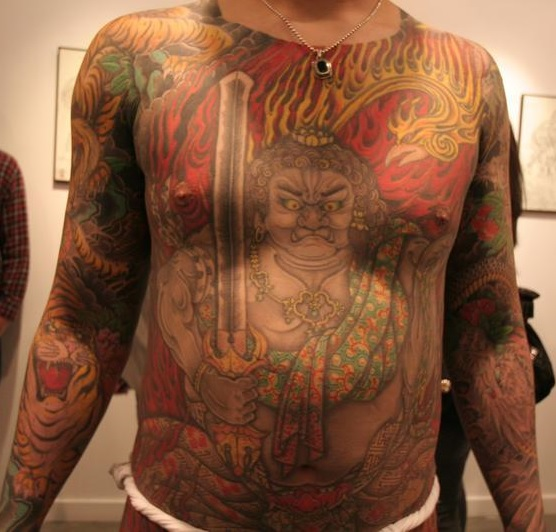
A man with an irezumi tattoo of Acala

== See also ==
- Wisdom King
- Trailokyavijaya
- Rāgarāja
- Homa (ritual)
- Narita-san
- Kaal Bhairav (Hindu deity with similar feature)

== Bibliography ==
- Bond, Kevin (2001). Ritual and Iconography in the Japanese Esoteric Buddhist Tradition: The Nineteen Visualizations of Fudō Myōō (PDF) (Thesis). McMaster University.
- Faure, Bernard (2015). The Fluid Pantheon: Gods of Medieval Japan, Volume 1. University of Hawaii Press. ISBN 978-0824857028.
- Getty, Alice (1988). The Gods of Northern Buddhism: Their History and Iconography. Courier Dover Publications. p. 170. ISBN 978-0-486-25575-0.
- Haneda, Shukai (2020). Fudō Myōō kara chikara o moraeru hon 不動明王から力をもらえる本 (in Japanese). Daihōrinkaku. p. 264. ISBN 978-4-8046-1386-4.
- Miyasaka, Yūshō (2006). Fudō-shinkō Jiten 不動信仰事典 (in Japanese). Ebisu Kōshō Shuppan. ISBN 978-4-900901-68-1.
- Murakami, Shigeyoshi (1988). 日本宗教事典 [Japanese Religion dictionary]. Kodansha. ISBN 4-06-158837-0.
- Shincho Sekai Bijutsu Jiten 新潮世界美術事典 [Shincho Encyclopedia of World Art]. Shinchosha. 1985. ISBN 4-10-730206-7.
- Snyder, Gary (1999). Smokey the Bear Sutra. Counterpoint. p. 241. ISBN 978-1-58243-079-9.
