= Kaal Bhairav, Kathmandu =

Kaal Bhairav
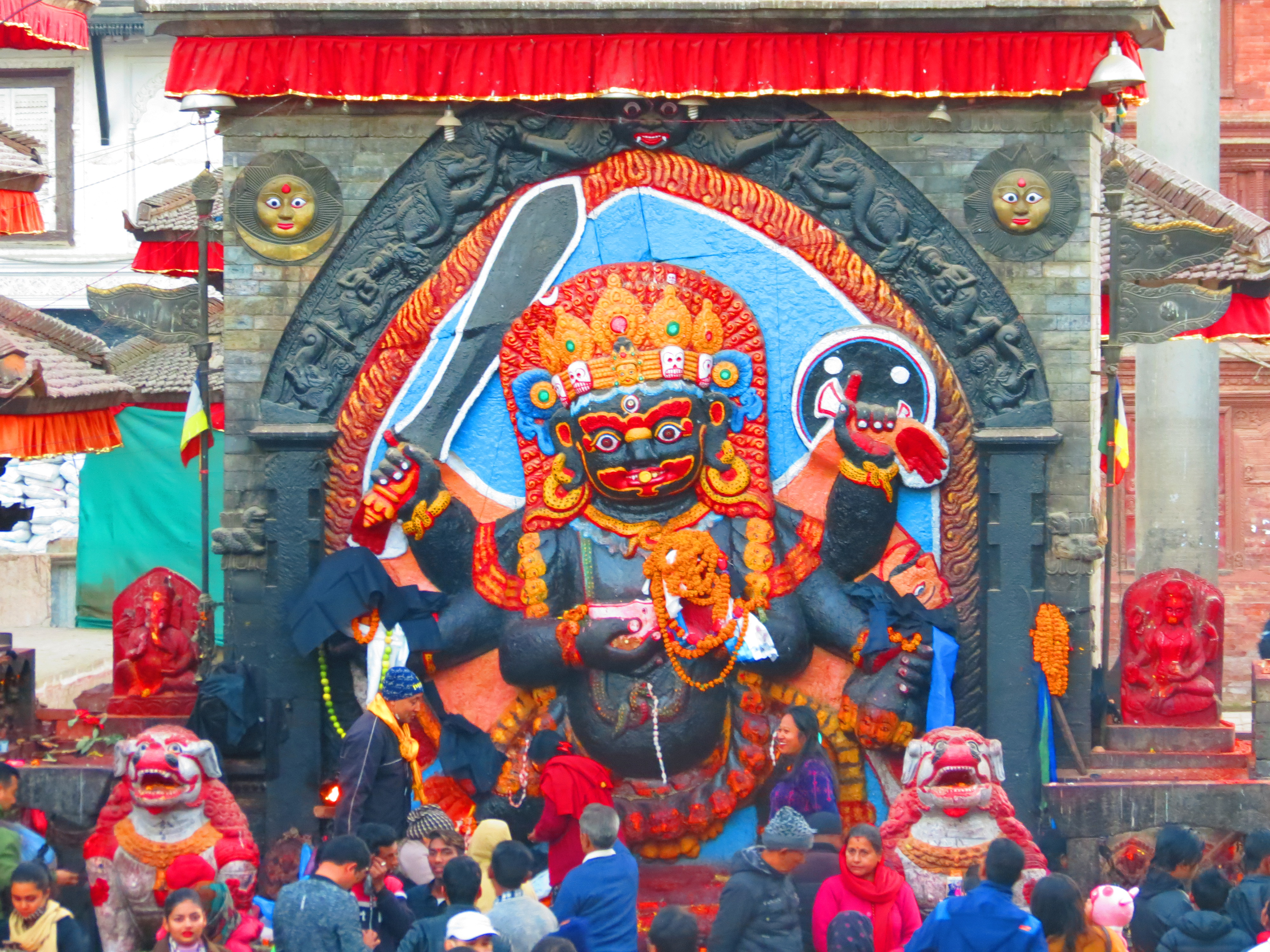

- Location within Bagmati Province Location within Nepal

Religion
- Affiliation: Hinduism
- District: Kathmandu
- Province: Bagmati
- Deity: Kaal Bhairav

Location
- Location: Kathmandu Durbar Square
- Country: Nepal
- Coordinates: 27°42′17″N 85°18′26″E

Kaal Bhairav

Kaal Bhairav is a Hindu shrine located in Kathmandu Durbar Square, a UNESCO World Heritage Site. According to legend, the shrine was found at a paddy field and later it was placed at the Durbar Square by King Pratap Malla. Kaal Bhairav is believed to have been sculptured from a single stone.
