= Guhyaka =

Semi-divine beings in Hindu mythology

Guhyaka(s) (गुह्यक, literally "hidden ones") is a class of supernatural beings in Hindu mythology. Like Yakshas (nature-spirits), they are often described as attendants of Kubera, the keeper of wealth, and protect his hidden treasures. Guhyakas are believed to live in mountain caves; thus their name, "hidden ones". As lord of Guhyakas, Kubera is called "Guhyakadhipati".

== Description ==
Edward Washburn Hopkins suggests that Guhyakas may not be distinct beings, but a generic name for spirits of concealment. They are mentioned in the Manu Smriti and the Harivamsa, appendix of the epic Mahabharata, as distinct beings; however, the epic and the Meghaduta identify them with Yakshas.

Guhyakas are described as the most trusted and close associates of Kubera, who resides with them on Mount Kailash. Kubera assigns them important tasks like delivering a magic eye-wash to the god and epic-hero Rama, to aid him in war. They also serve as messengers and are sent to witness battles. In other instances, they are described as residing on Hemakuta or on Mount Gandhamandana, in the palace of Kubera. They also live on earth and in hills. They are described as half-bird or half-equine in nature. They have glowing forms in heaven, take demonic forms during war, and look like gnomes on earth.

The Mahabharata, which treats them as a type of Yakshas, mentions that the airborne palaces of Kubera are held in the sky by Guhyakas; in other instances, the god himself is described as being carried by Guhyakas. It is also described that Bhima, a hero in the epic, kills them when he attacks Kubera on Gandhamandana. The soldiers who die by sword neither bravely nor cowardly, as mentioned in the Mahabharata War, are said to go to the abode of Guhyakas after death. This is the second lowest realm that souls can enter, the lowest being Naraka (hell) for sinners. Guhyakas are also associated with Pitrs ("ancestors") and are sometimes equated to ghosts.

The twin-physician gods Ashvins, annual plants, and inferior animals are described as Guhyakas. In the Bhagavata Purana, Kubera's son Nalakuvara and Manigriva are described as Guhyakas.

Though often associated with Kubera, the Brihat-Samhita of Varahamihira as well as some Puranas describe Guhyakas as attendants of Revanta, the son of the Sun-god Surya. The Markandeya Purana mentions that Revanta was assigned the duty as the chief of Guhyakas by Surya. In sculpture, Revanta is often depicted with the Guhyakas in hunting scenes.

== Books ==
- Hopkins, Edward Washburn (1915). Epic mythology. Strassburg K.J. Trübner. ISBN 0-8426-0560-6.
