= Tumburu =

Celestial musician in Hindu mythology

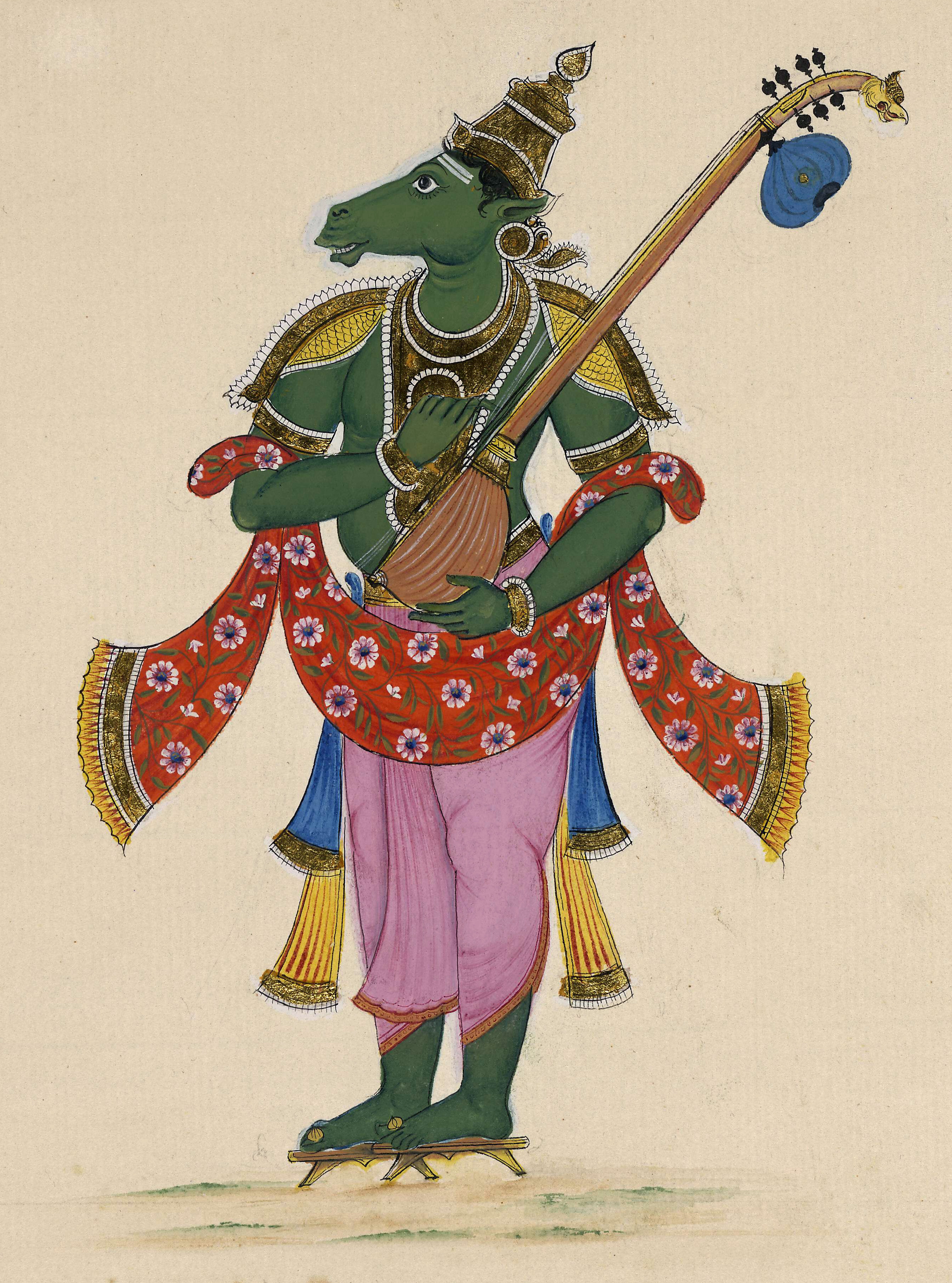
- Painting of Tumburu
- Other names: Tumbaru, Tumbara, and Tumruka
- Affiliation: Gandharva, Deva
- Abode: Gandharvaloka

Genealogy
- Parents: Kashyapa (father); Pradha (mother)
- Consort: Rambha
- Children: Manovatī and Sukeśā

Tumburu (Sanskrit: तुम्बुरु, romanized: Tuṃburu) is the foremost among the gandharvas, the celestial musicians. Accounts depict him performing in the courts of the deities Kubera and Indra, and as singing the praises of Vishnu. He is said to lead the gandharvas in their singing.

== Legend ==
=== Origin ===
Tumburu is described as the son of Sage Kashyapa, and his wife, Pradha. Along with the other three gandharva sons of Kashyapa, Bahu, Haha, and Huhu, he is renowned for his sweet and pleasant speech.

Tumburu is often described as the best among the gandharvas in his musical talent. A "mighty singer and musician", he sings in presence of the devas. Besides Narada and Gopa, he is also regarded as the king of songs.

=== Rivalry with Narada ===
The Bhagavata Purana considers Narada to be the teacher of Tumburu. The scripture mentions that Tumburu accompanied him on a visit to the court of Yudhishthira. Narada and Tumburu are said to sing the glories of Vishnu.

The Adbhuta Ramayana mentions that Tumburu was the best of all singers, and is rewarded by Vishnu. Narada, a devotee of Vishnu, became jealous of Tumburu. Vishnu tells Narada that Tumburu was dearer to him as he loved songs of praise, rather than austerities that were performed by Narada. He sent Narada to an owl named Ganabandhu, to learn music. After learning from the owl, Narada sets to conquer Tumburu. When he reaches Tumburus's house, he sees Tumburu surrounded by wounded men and women, who he discovers are the musical Ragas and Raginis, injured by his bad singing. Humiliated, Narada leaves, and finally learns to exceed the gandharva's talents by learning the seven svaras first from the deity Krishna's secondary wives, Jambavati and Satyabhama, and then his favourite wife, Rukmini.

=== Status ===
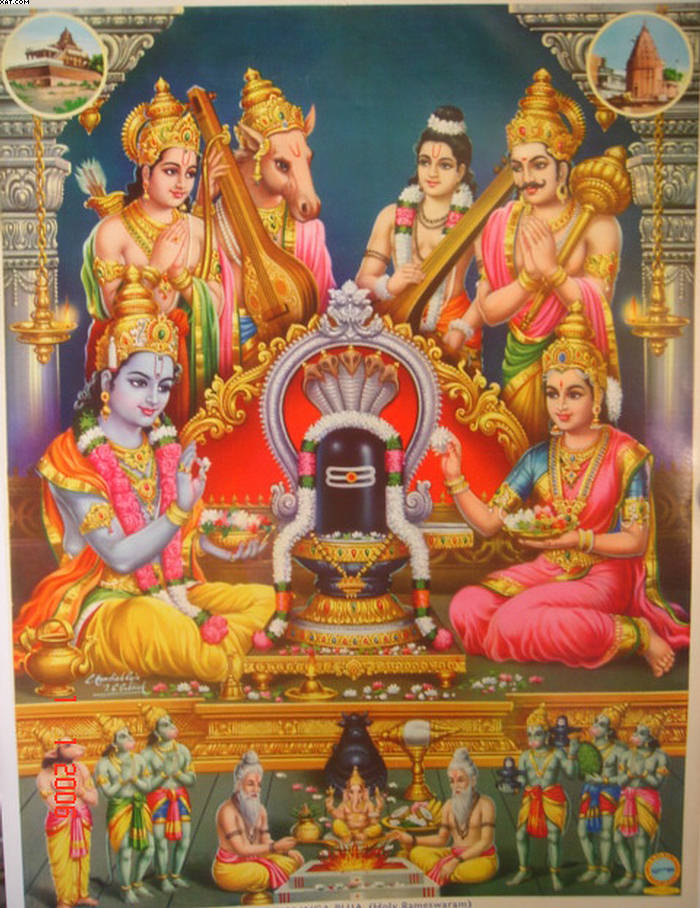
Tumburu (second from left, standing) with (from left) Lakshmana, Narada, Vibhishana watch as Rama and his wife Sita worship a lingam at Rameshvaram.

Tumburu is mentioned as the courtier of Indra – the king of Svarga – as well as of Kubera, the god of wealth. He is described as a follower of Kubera; his songs are said to be usually heard when passing Kubera's abode on Gandhamandana mountain. Tumburu is described as the special friend of Kubera, and leads the gandharvas in music and singing, which is performed by gandharvas and kinnaras. Tumburu is described as a "lord of gandharvas", along with other lords like Haha-Huhu, Parvata, Citraratha. Tumburu is sometimes mentioned as a muni (sage), rather than a gandharva. Tumburu is also described to lead gandharvas to watch the battles of men, and goes to Mount Meru to worship with the divine sage Narada.

=== Relationships ===
Tumburu is also described as the preceptor of the apsara – celestial dancer – Rambha. He is sometimes described as wedded to her. He is thought to be as "the martial hero" of the gandharvas, "yet one of the few yielding to love". In another reference, he is described to have two daughters, Manovatī and Sukeśā, called Pancacudas collectively, and who ride the Sun's chariot in the months of Chaitra and Madhu (Vaisakha). Tumburu is said to preside over months Madhu and Madhava (Magha).

=== South Indian tradition ===
In South India, Tumburu is often portrayed horse-faced. He holds the instrument veena that he plays as he sings. In another hand, he holds wooden cymbals, that he beats to maintain the rhythm. A South Indian legend records that Tumburu once performed severe austerities and pleased Shiva. Tumburu asked Shiva to travel the universe, skill in music and singing, and the ability to reside with and serve Shiva. Shiva blessed him and granted the boons that he sought.

== Literature ==
=== Mahabharata ===
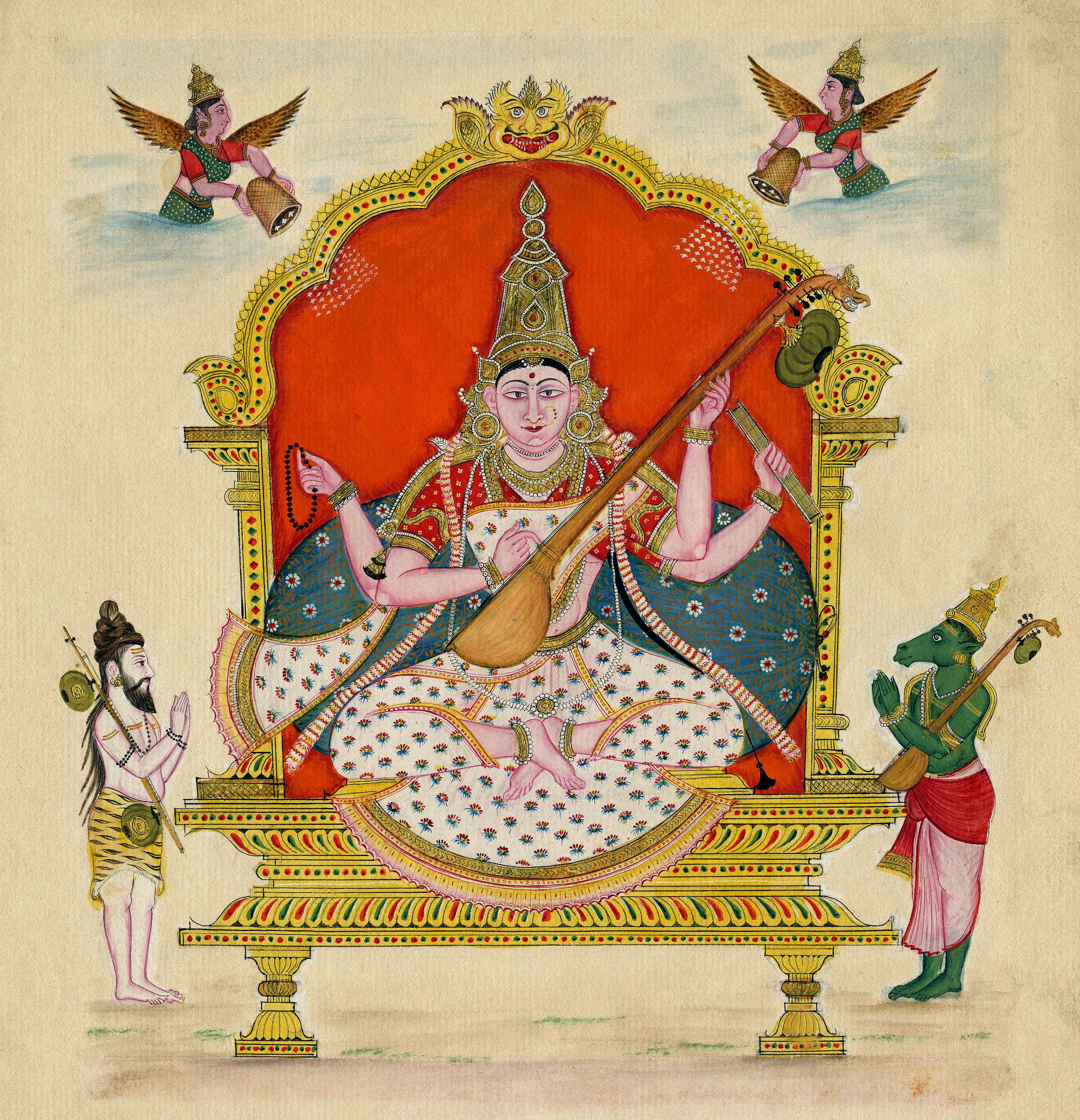
Narada (left) and Tumburu bow to the goddess Sarasvati, the goddess of music and learning.

In the Mahabharata, Tumburu appears in many instances related to the Pandava brothers – the primary protagonists of the epic. Tumburu gifts Yudhishthira a hundred horses, and also attends his ashvamedha yagna ("horse-sacrifice"). He also stays in Yudhishthira's court for some days.

Tumburu also attends the birth celebrations of the Pandava Arjuna, and welcomes him in Svarga (heaven) when he visits his father, Indra. "A friend of Arjuna", Tumburu also keenly watches Arjuna's battle fought against the Kauravas – the primary antagonists of the epic, and cousins of the Pandavas – on the side of Virata. Tumburu also grants Arjuna his gandharva weapon.

Tumburu also grants Shikhandi - an ally of the Pandavas - his war-horses.

=== Ramayana ===
The Ramayana mentions that Rama – the avatar of Vishnu, and his brother Lakshmana, encounter a rakshasa called Viradha, while in exile in the forest. This rakshasa was the cursed Tumburu. Tumburu once offended Kubera by not bringing Rambha before Kubera at the stipulated time. Enraged, Kubera cursed him to be born as a rakshasa. Kubera also decreed that Tumburu would be freed from the curse when Rama would slay him. Accordingly, Tumburu was born as Viradha, the son of giant Jaya and his wife, Shatahrada. Viradha had two long arms and a fierce appearance. He rushed at Sita, Rama's wife, and caught hold of her, and starting running again. Rama and Lakshamana followed him, compelling him to set Sita down. Then, they sat on the rakshasa's shoulders and chopped off his arms. As Viradha was still alive, the brothers decided to bury him alive. Viradha then told his story to Rama and acquired the form of Tumburu, liberated from the curse and returned to the home of the gandharvas.

=== Kathasaritsagara ===
The Kathasaritsagara mentions that Tumburu's curse was responsible for the separation of the couple – King Pururavas and the apsara Urvashi. Pururavas was once visiting heaven, when Rambha was performing before her preceptor, Tumburu. Pururavas insulted her by finding a fault in her dance. When Tumburu questioned Pururavas's knowledge of the divine dances of heaven, the king responded that his wife Uravashi had taught him more than what Tumburu knew about the subject. Agitated, Tumburu cursed the king that he would be separated from Urvashi, till he performs a penance to Vishnu. The gandharvas then kidnapped Urvashi, resulting in the fruition of the curse.

== In popular culture ==
The musical instrument tambura is believed to either be a cognate, or named after Tumburu.
