= Viradha =

Demon in epic Ramayana

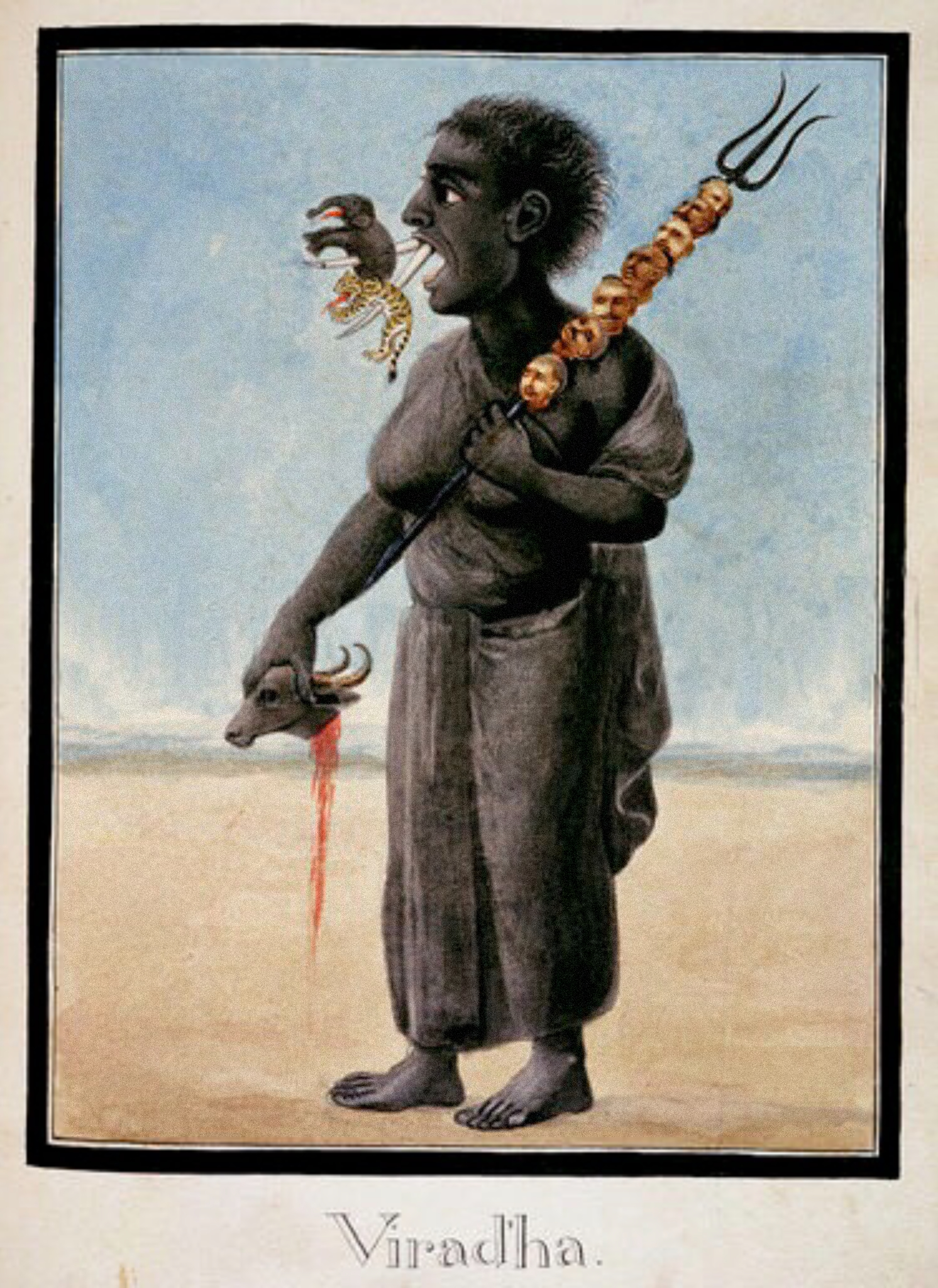
- Viradha, a man-eating demon encountered by Rama, from the Hindu epic 'Adhyatma Ramayana', 1802.
- Appears in: Ramayana; Ramakien; Reamker

Viradha in Ramayana

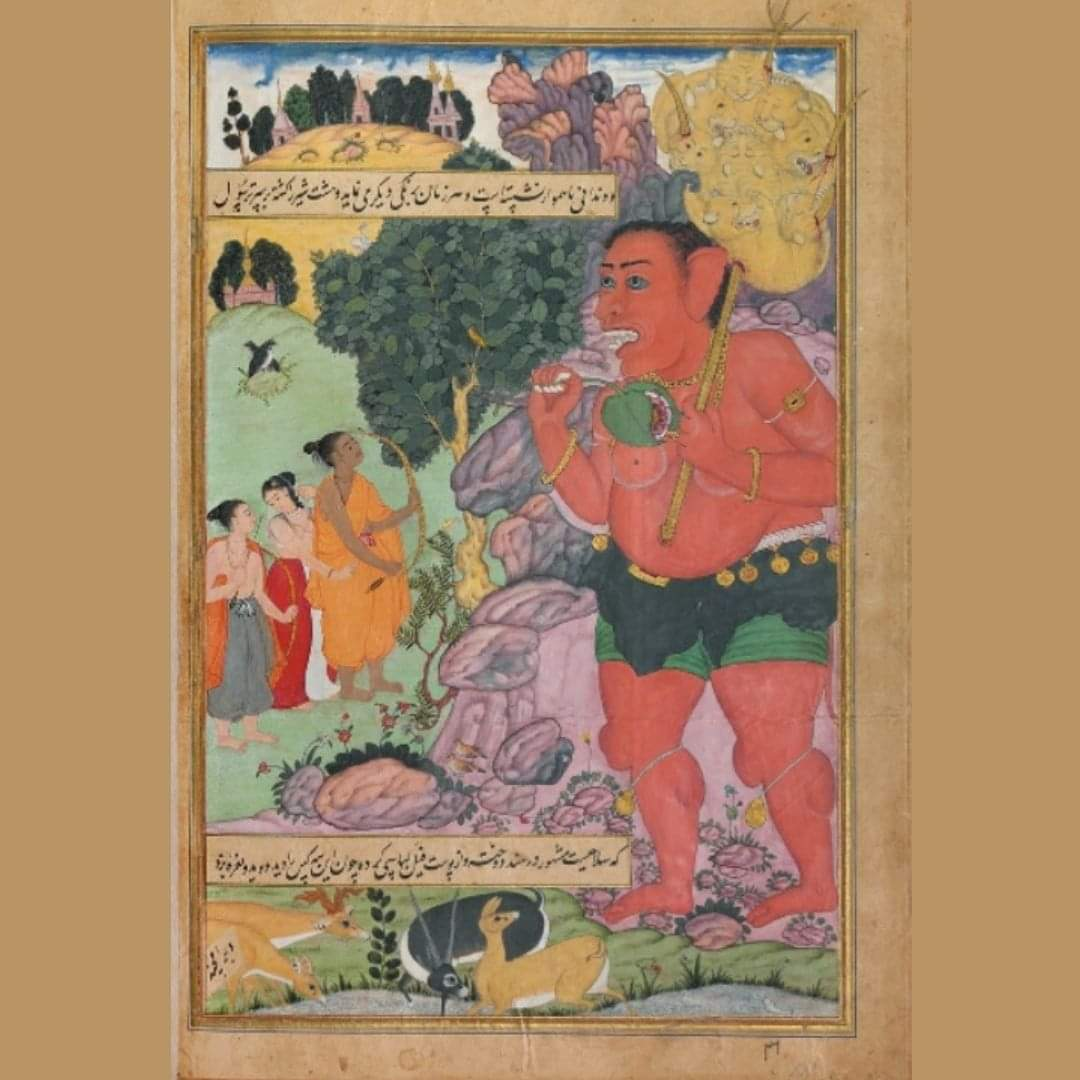
Painting depicting Rama, Sita, and Laksmana enoucuntered by Viradha

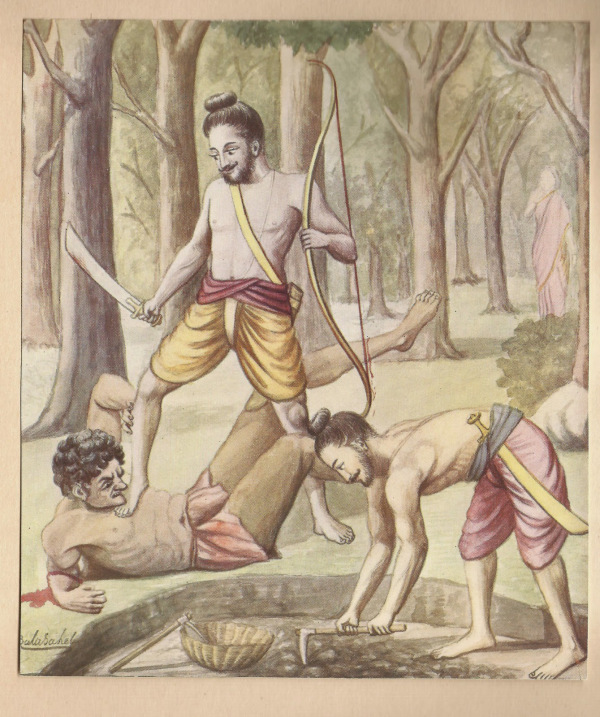
Viradha had a special power in that he could not be killed with any weapon. Knowing this fact, Rama grounded and stood on him. Lakshmana dug a moat, and Viradha was buried live.

Virādha (Sanskrit: विराध, Tamil: Viratan, Thai: Phirap, Malay: Purbaita) is minor character from the Aranya Kanda of the Ramayana. He is a rakshasa living in Dandaka forest who briefly kidnaps Sita in an episode that has been described as "strongly [prefiguring Sita's] later abduction by Ravana, the central event of the book and the pivotal event of the epic." Rama and Lakshmana begin to battle the monster, but though they shoot it with many arrows, the arrows pass straight through him and leave him unharmed (Aranyakanda, Sarga 3).

The monster reveals that he has a boon from Brahma which makes him invincible to weapons. So, the brothers kill the rakshasa by first breaking his arms, then burying him alive in a grave. When the monster's arms are broken, he begins to praise the brothers for liberating him: he had, in a previous life, been a celestial being named Tumburu, and had been cursed by Kubera to live as a fearsome monster until he be killed by Rama. The brothers bury him, and he apparently goes back to his former celestial abode.

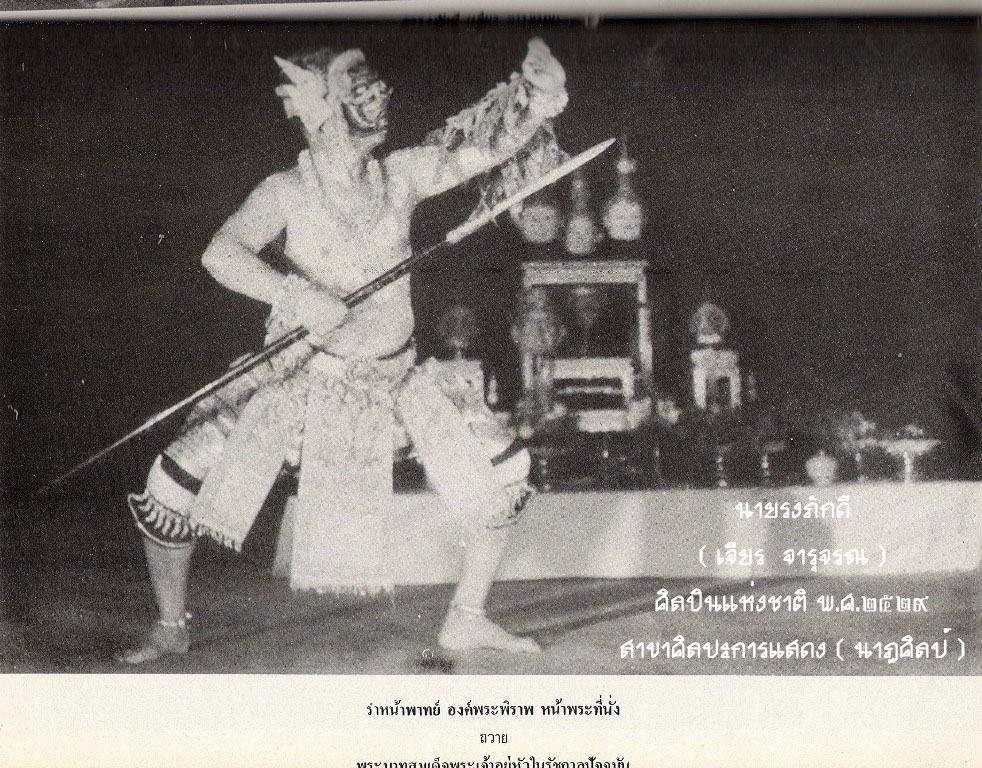
Chian Charuchon performs Phra Phirap. Thailand, 1961.

== In Thai Tradition ==
In Thailand, Virādha is reimagined as Phra Phirap (พระพิราพ) in the Thai version of the Ramayana, known as the Ramakien. While Virādha appears in the Ramayana as a cursed demon, in Thai tradition, Phirap evolves into a more complex and revered spiritual figure due to being the founder and guardian of Phawa Thong Park. He is regarded not merely as a monster but as a powerful deity associated with divine wrath and mystical knowledge.

This transformation stems from the identification of Phra Phirap with Bhairava, a fierce and wrathful form of the Hindu god Shiva. Bhairava is known in the Hindu tradition as a guardian and protector deity, and in Thailand, these characteristics were assimilated into the character of Phirap, making him a central figure in Thai spiritual and performing arts traditions.

== Classical Music and Dance ==
Phra Phirap holds the status of a kru yak (ครูยักษ์), or "giant teacher spirit," especially in the context of Thai classical music and dance. He is considered the supreme teacher in the art of Khon, the sacred masked dance drama of Thailand. In this tradition, Phra Phirap's mask is placed at the highest position during the annual Wai Khru (ไหว้ครู) ceremony, which honours the lineage of teachers. Dancers performing the role of Phirap undergo rigorous training, as his movements are considered the most difficult and spiritually significant.

== Clarification and Cultural Status ==
Although the name Phirap is linguistically derived from Virādha, the character in Thai belief has become an entirely distinct figure, blending local animist, Buddhist, and Hindu concepts. Institutions like Museum Siam and Thai religious websites clarify that Phra Phirap has evolved into a guardian deity representing protection, discipline, and mastery over performing arts.

== See also ==
- Ramakien
- Bhairava
- Khon
- Shiva
