= Nidhi =

Group of nine treasures in Hinduism

Nidhi (Sanskrit: निधि, romanized: nidhi) is a Sanskrit term meaning, "treasure". It is generally used to indicate the nine treasures called navanidhi (Sanskrit: नवनिधि, romanized: navanidhi) belonging to Kubera, the god of wealth. According to tradition, each nidhi is personified as having a guardian spirit, with some Tantrikas worshipping them. The nature and characteristics of nidhis have remained largely unexplained and have not been fully understood.

== Description ==
According to the Amarakosha and the Padma Purana, the nine nidhis are:

Name	Meaning	Symbolism
Mahapadma	"great lotus flower"	Twofold Himalayan lake
Padma	"lotus flower"	Himalayan lake
Shankha	"conch"	Conch shell
Makara	"crocodile"	black antimony
Kacchapa	"tortoise"	turtleshell
Mukunda	"a particular precious stone"	quicksilver
Kunda	"jasmine"	arsenic
Nila	"sapphire"	antimony
Kharva	"dwarf"	firebaked vessel

== Sources ==
- A Dictionary of Hindu Mythology & Religion by John Dowson
- A Classical Dictionary of Hindu Mythology and Religion, Geography, History, and Literature, by John Dawson, page 221
- Amarakosha, ed. W. L. Shastri Pansikar, v. 142
- Megha-duta, collected works, iv. 372. verse 534
