= Bhadra =

Hindu name

Bhadra (Note: Masculine: Sanskrit: भद्र, romanized: Bhadra Feminine: Sanskrit: भद्रा, romanized: Bhadrā) is a Sanskrit word meaning 'good', 'fortune' or 'auspicious'. It is also the name of many men, women and objects in Hinduism.

== Male Figures ==
=== King of Chedi ===
Bhadra was a king of Chedi Kingdom who participated in the Kurukshetra War from the side of the Pandavas. He was killed by the warrior Karna.

=== Grandson of Manu ===
The first man Svayambhuva Manu and his Shatarupa had a daughter named Shraddha. Bhadra was one of her twelve sons.

=== Yaksha ===
Bhadra was also the name of a Yaksha who served their king, Kubera. Due to a curse of sage Gautama, he was born as a lion.

=== Krishna's son ===
The god Krishna married the river goddess Kalindi and had 10 sons. Bhadra was one of them.

=== Sage ===
Bhadra was a renowned Maharishi. He was the son of Pramati and the father of Upamanyu.

== Female figures ==
=== Bhadrakali ===
Bhadrā or Bhadrakālī is one of the fierce forms of the supreme goddess Devi.

=== Kubera's wife ===
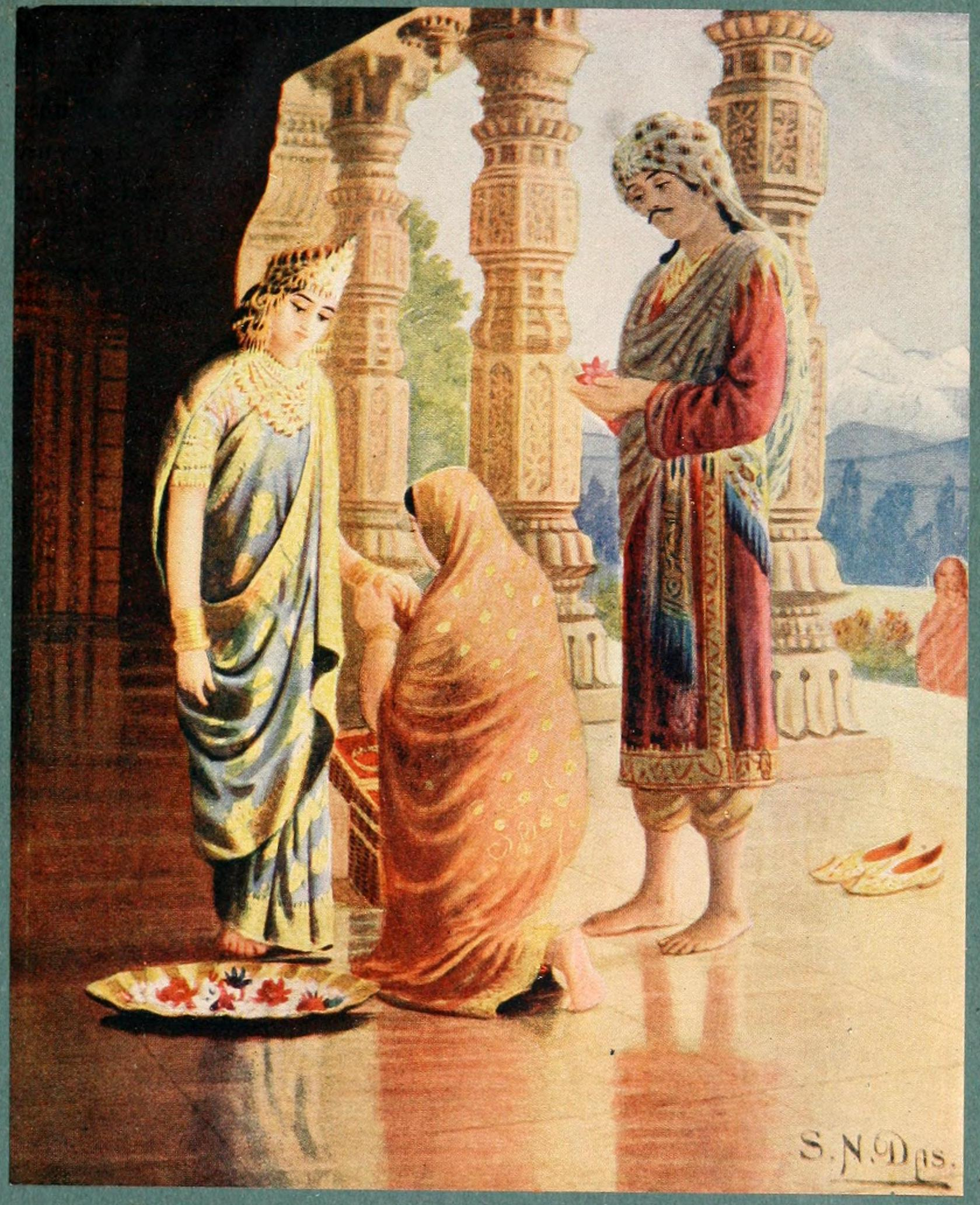
Kubera and his wife, Bhadrā, presenting gifts to Sati

Bhadrā is the queen of Yakshas. She was the first wife of Kubera, the god of wealth. She is also known by the names Yakshi, Chhavi, Riddhi, Manorama, Nidhi, Sahadevi and Kuberi. She is called Bhuñjatī in Buddhism. Bhadrā and Kubera had three sons named Nalakuvara, Manigriva and Mayuraja, and a daughter named Minakshi.

=== Chandra's daughter ===
Bhadrā was also the name of a daughter of Chandra (alias Soma), the moon god. She once did penance to gain the sage Utathya as her husband. Seeing this, sage Atri, her grandfather, got her married to Utathya. The god of the seas, Varuna, became enamoured of her and eloped with her from Utathya's hermitage and hid her inside the sea. Despite attempts by the sage Narada to make him return Bhadrā, Varuna refused to give her, causing an enraged Utathya to drink up the entire sea. Seeing the sage's divine powers, Varuna submitted himself to him and returned Bhadrā back. The sage was pleased to get her back, and released both the world and Varuna from their sufferings.

=== Krishna's wife ===
Bhadrā is one of the Ashtabharya, the eight principal queen-consorts of Hindu god Krishna. The Vishnu Purana and the Harivamsa refer to her as 'the daughter of Dhrishtaketu' or 'the princess of Kekeya'.

=== Vasudeva's wife ===
Krishna's father Vasudeva also had a wife named Bhadrā. She died on the funeral pyre of her husband.

=== Wife of Vyushitashva ===
Bhadrā was a beautiful princess, who was the daughter of King Kakshivan. She married King Vyushitashva of Puru dynasty. After his untimely death, she lamented over his body. The spirit of her husband appeared in the sky and blessed her with six sons.

=== Princess of Vishala ===
Bhadrā was a princess of Vishala who once did penance to married King Karusha. Shishupala, a king, disguised himself as Karusha and married her.
