= Rambha (apsara) =

Apsara in Hindu mythology

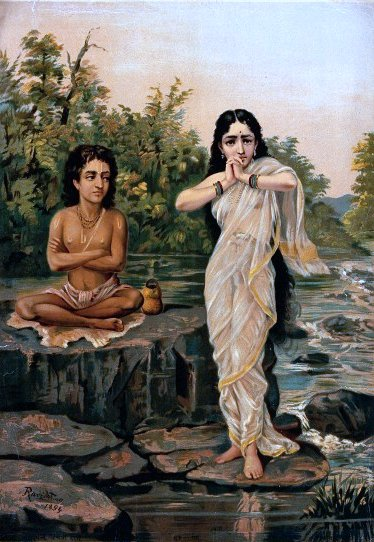
- Rambha tries to seduce Shuka, art by Raja Ravi Varma
- Affiliation: Apsara
- Abode: Svarga
- Consort: Nalakuvara

Rambha (Sanskrit: रम्भा, romanized: Rambhā) is one of the prominent apsaras, the celestial nymphs of Svarga (a heaven), in Hindu mythology. She is extolled to be unrivalled in her accomplishments in the arts of dancing, music, and beauty.

== Legends ==
=== Birth ===
According to the Adi Parva of the epic Mahabharata, Rambha and her apsaras sisters Alambusha, Mishrakeshi, Vidhyutparna, Tilottama, Aruna, Rakshita, Manorama, Subahu, Keshini, Surata and Suraja are the daughters of the sage Kashyapa and his wife Pradha. In the Bhagavata Purana, the name of the mother of the Apsaras is Muni.

In some Puranic scriptures, a varying account is found, according to which Rambha and other apsaras emerged from Kshira Sagara (the ocean of milk) during Samudra Manthana (the churning of the ocean).

=== Encounter with Vishvamitra ===
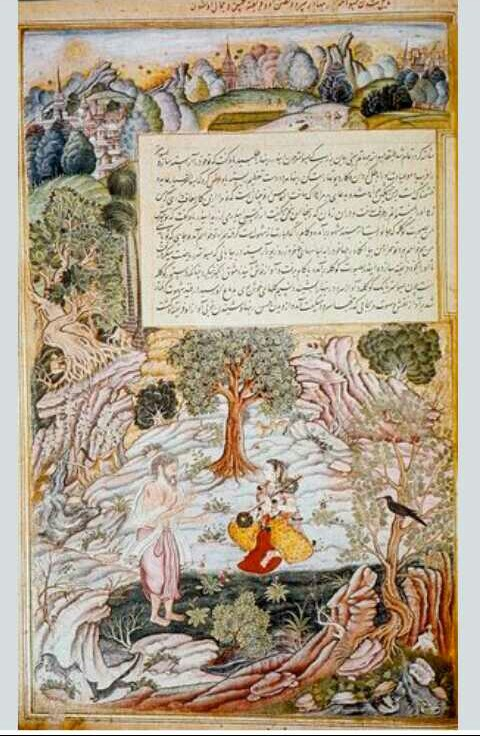
Rambha (centre) sings in front of Vishvamitra, a painting from the Mughal Ramayana.

Rambha and other apsaras are frequently sent by the king of the devas, Indra, to seduce rishis (sages) and ensuring that they don't gain divine powers by self-abnegation and austerities.

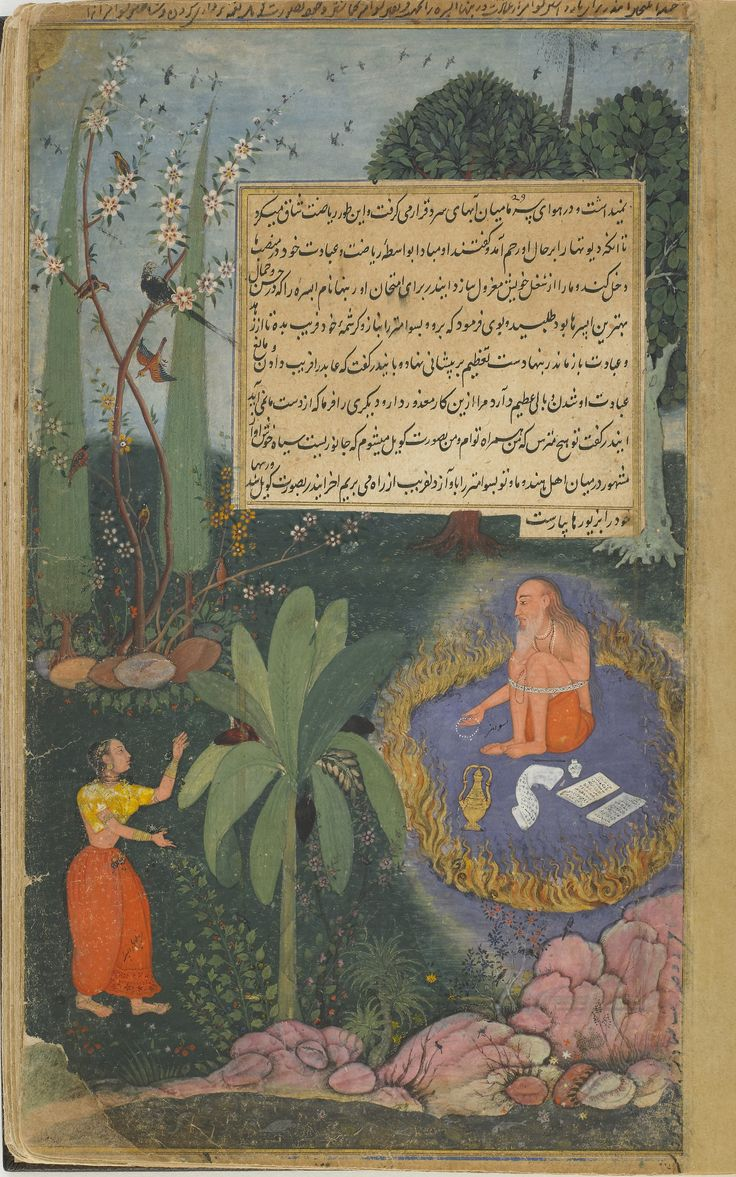
At Indra's insistence, Rambha approaches Vishvamitra to distract the sage from his austerities - Ramayana By Akbar

The Bala Kanda of the epic Ramayana narrates that Rambha is instructed by Indra to disturb the penance of Vishvamitra, a sage who had been previously seduced by another apsara named Menaka. Realising Indra had sent another nymph to lure him, an infuriated Vishvamitra curses her to transform into a rock for ten thousand years till a Brahmin relieves her from the curse.

=== Rape by Ravana ===
Rambha is described as the consort of Nalakuvara, the son of Kubera, the king of the Yaksha.

In the Uttara Kanda of the Ramayana, Ravana, the king of Lanka and the half-brother of Kubera, saw Rambha on a mountain and was captivated by her beauty. He sought her to fulfil his lust, but she protested by telling him she was his daughter-in-law. However, Ravana mocks her by stating that an apsara belongs to no one and proceeds to assault her. After the event, Rambha sought her husband and told him what had transpired.

O Lord, this night, Dashagriva (Ravana) scaled the Trivishtapa Peak while he was encamped on that mountain with his army and I was observed by him as I came to meet you, O Conqueror of Your Foes! That Rakshasa seized hold of me and questioned me saying “To whom do you belong?” Then I told him all, verily the whole truth, but he, intoxicated with desire, would not listen to me when I pleaded with him, saying “I am your daughter-in-law!” Refusing to listen to mine entreaties, he assaulted me ruthlessly! This is mine only fault, O You of firm vows, you should therefore pardon me. O Friend, verily there is no equality of strength between man and woman!’

— Valmiki, Ramayana, Uttara Kanda, Chapter 26

Outraged, Nalakuvara curses Ravana to have his head burst into seven pieces if he ever committed violence against a woman out of lust. Sita, the wife of Rama, who Ravana later forcefully abducts, is saved from Ravana's lust only due to the curse. His abduction of Sita leads to his death at the hands of Rama.

=== Encounter with Shuka ===
Rambha is featured in the kavya (poem) Śṛṅgārajñānanirṇaya (lit. 'distinction between love and knowledge'), where she is sent to seduce a young sage named Shuka but instead has a conversation with him. She uses an erotic tone to convince Shuka that a man's life is fruitless without love, to which he counters that a man's life is useless if he is unable to attain the highest wisdom.
