= Maṇibhadra =

One of the prominent Yakshas

- God of Property
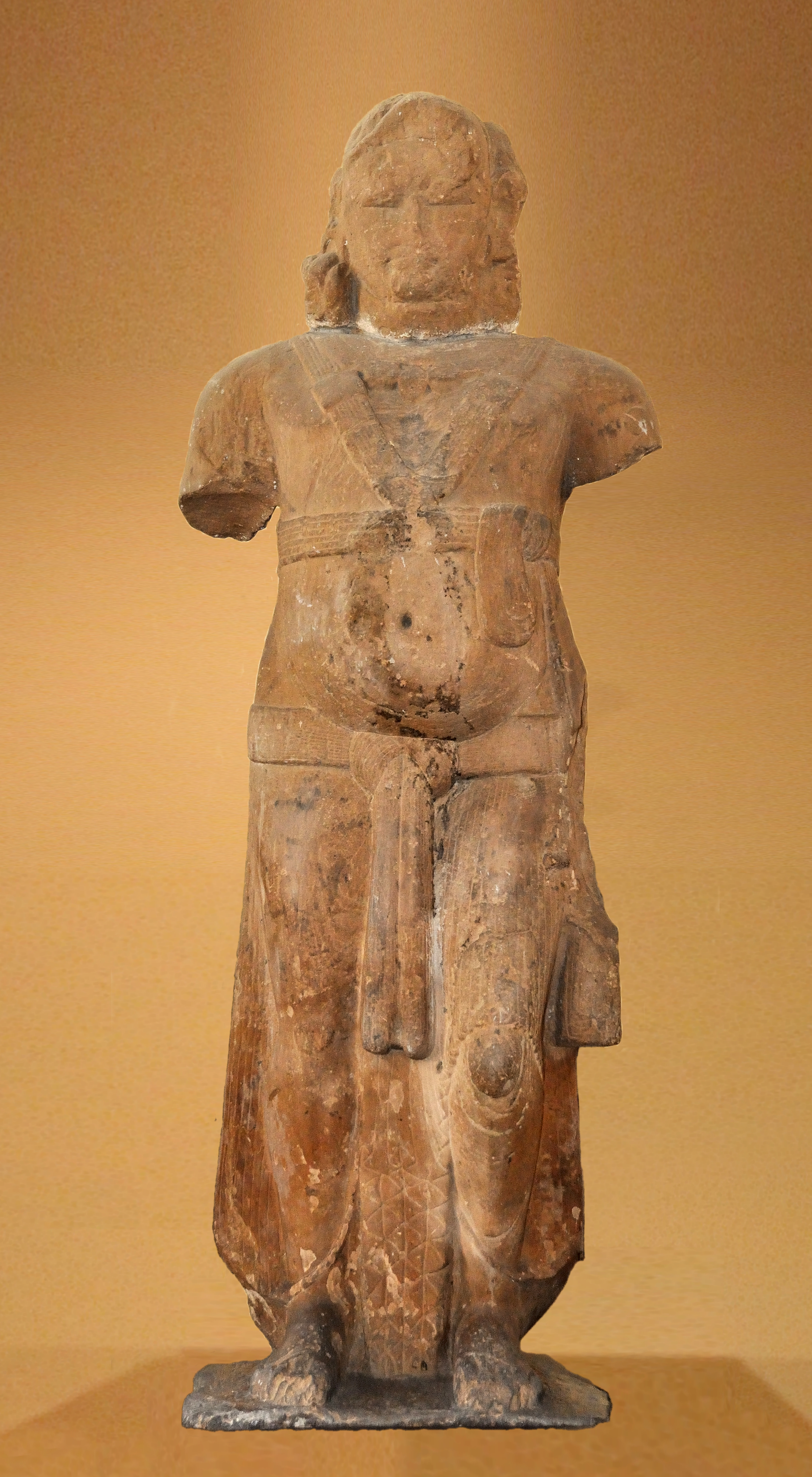
- The "Parkam Yaksha" Manibhadra.
- Affiliation: Manigriva, Kuberaputra, Yakshyuvraj, Yakshupati
- Abode: Alka puri
- Mantra: Om Yashpati Kubera putra Manibhadra Namaha
- Weapon: Spear
- Symbol: power
- Mount: Mongoose

Genealogy
- Parents: Kubera (father); Bhadra (mother)
- Siblings: Nalakuvara
- Consort: Gandhravkumari and Punyajani

Maṇibhadra (Sanskrit: 'as excellent as a jewel') is one of the major yakshas. He was a popular deity in ancient India.

== Iconography ==
Several well known images of yaksha Manibhadra have been found. The two oldest known image are:

=== Yaksha Manibhadra from Parkham ===
Yaksha Manibhadra coming from Parkham near Mathura, datable to period 200 BCE – 50 BC This Yaksha figure has been dated by Ananda Coomaraswamy to be not later than 500 BCE. as it bears inscription referring to Kunika Ajatashatru who died in 618 BCE (Pg.17, Introduction to Indian Art). The statue is 2.59 meters high. On stylistic grounds and paleographical analysis of the inscription, the statue is datable to the middle of the 2nd century BCE. The inscription says "Made by Gomitaka, a pupil of Kunika. Set up by eight brothers, members of the Manibhadra congregation ("puga")." This inscription thus indicates that the statue represents the Yaksa Manibhadra. According to John Boardman, the hem of the dress is derived from Greek art. Describing a similar statue, John Boardman writes: "It has no local antecedents and looks most like a Greek Late Archaic mannerism". Similar folds can be seen in the Bharhut Yavana.

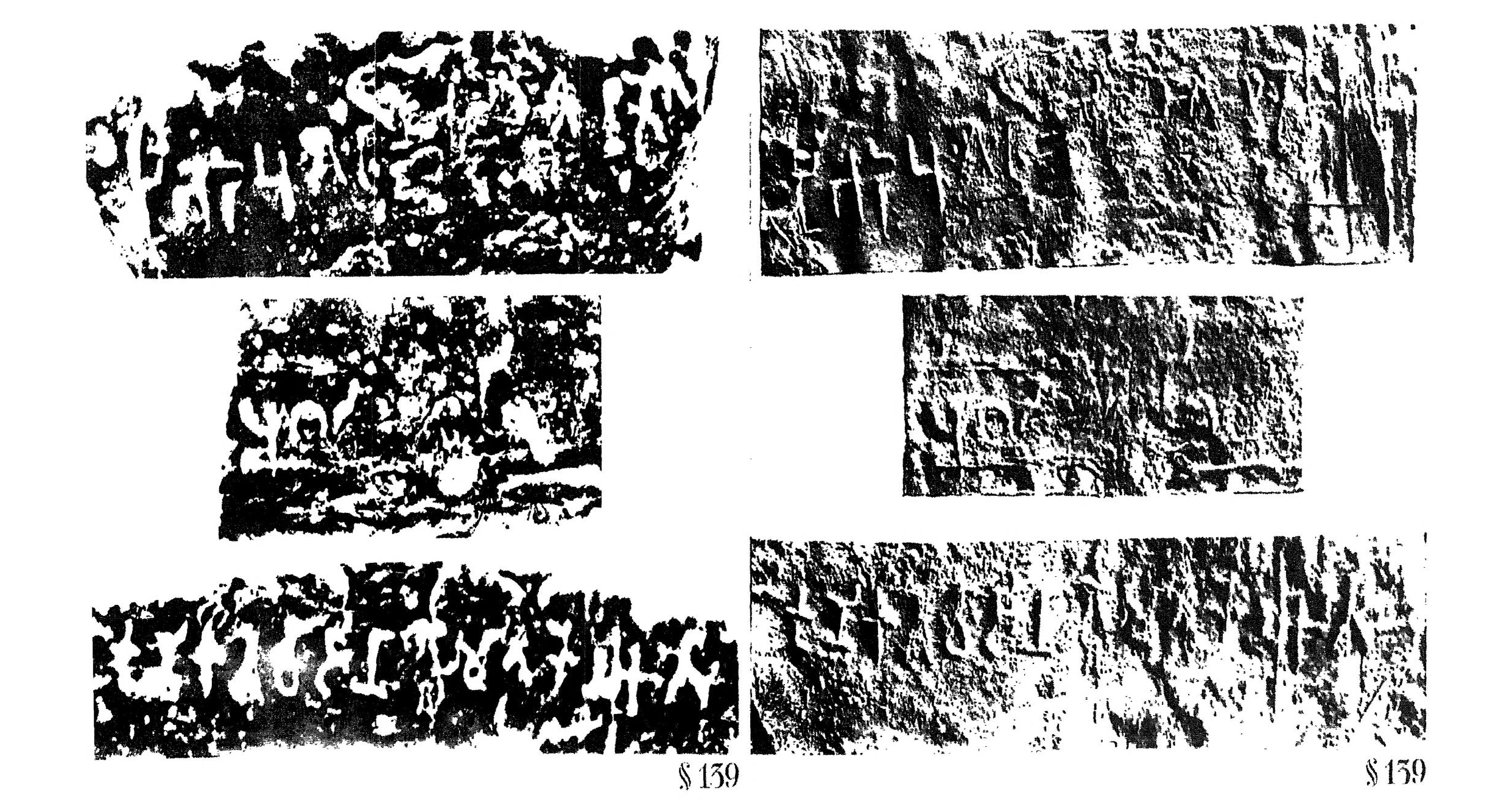
Parkham Yaksha inscription, paleographically dated to mid-2nd century BCE.

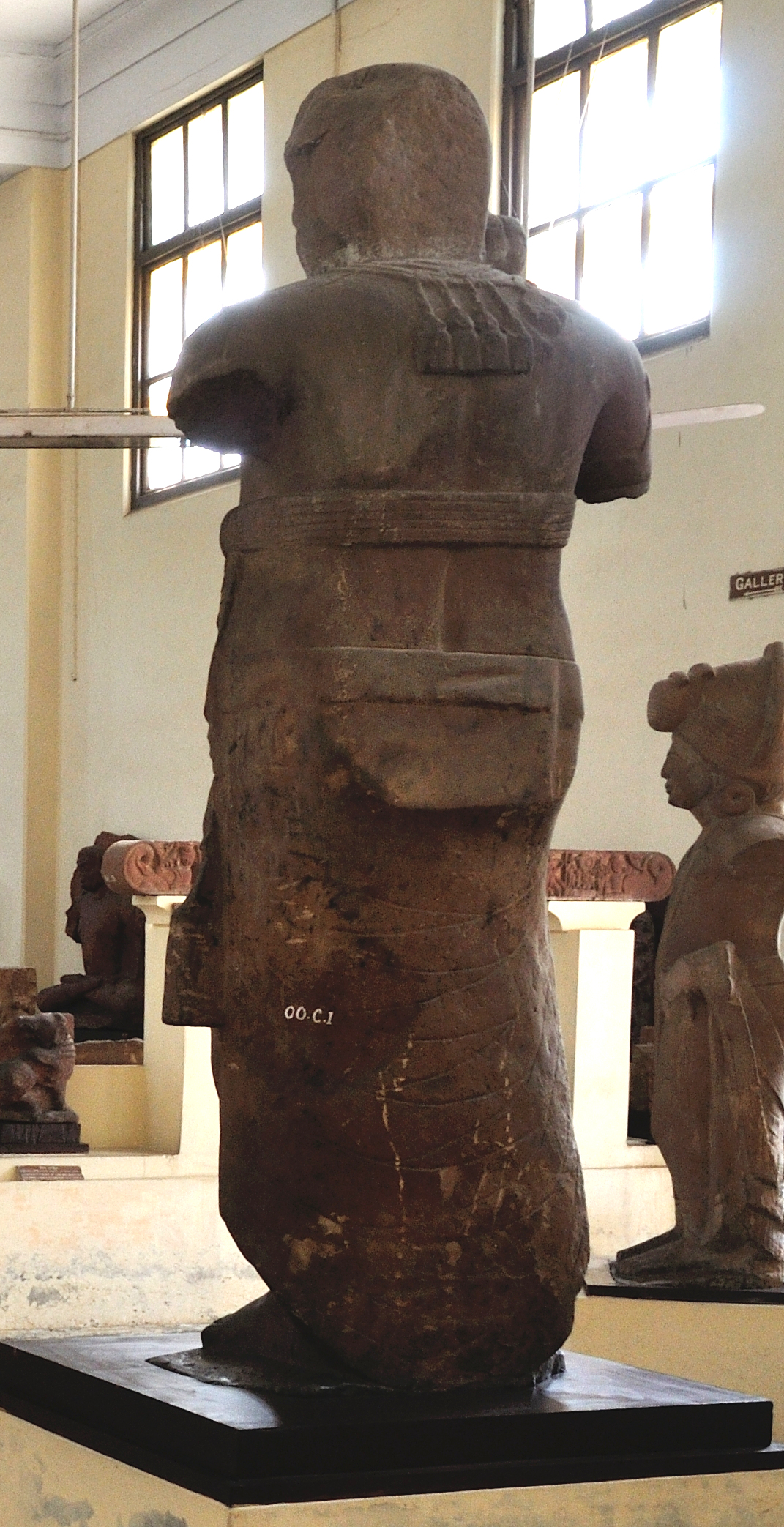
Parkham Yaksha (rear view)

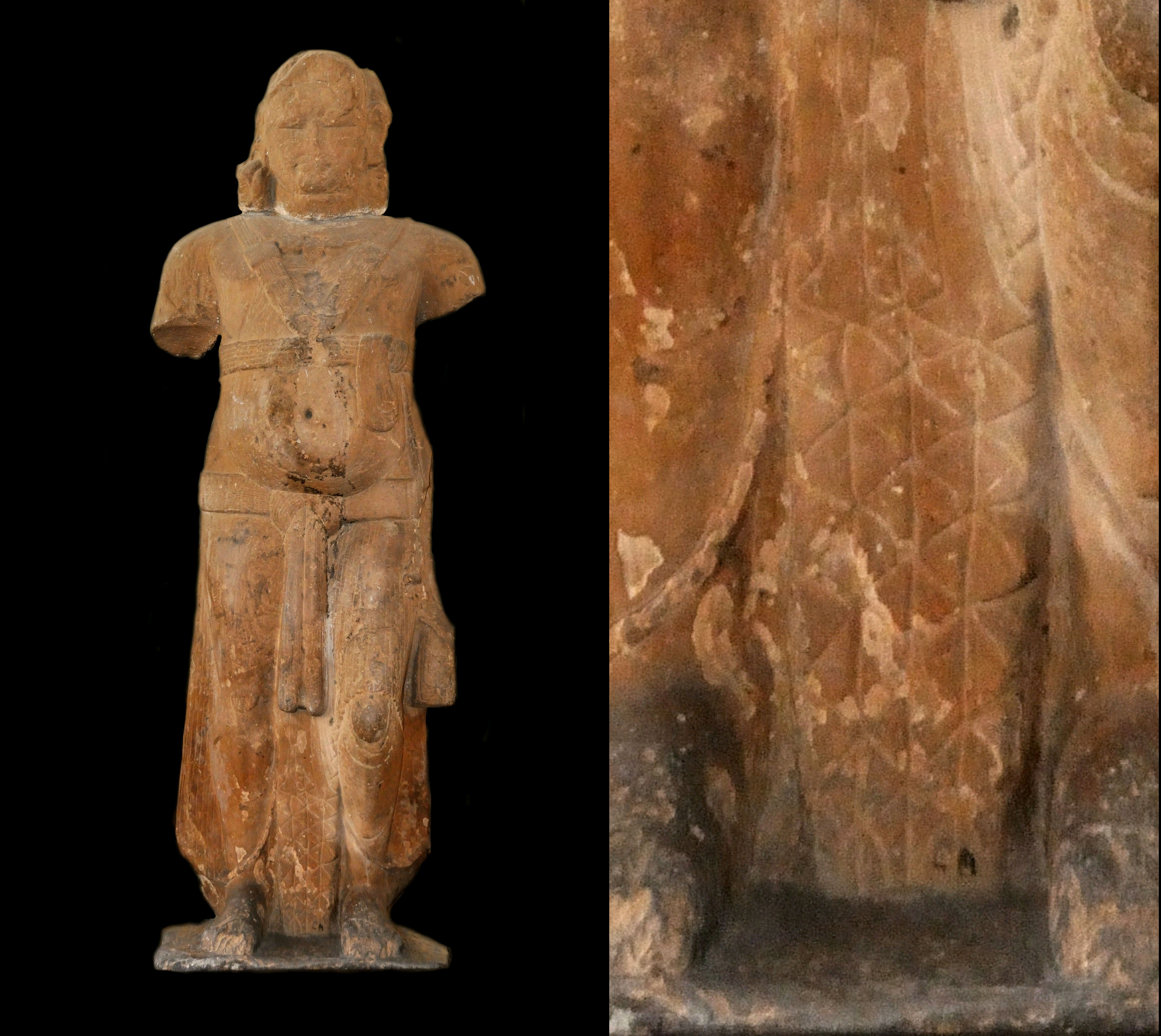
Parkham Yaksha, and detail of the wavy fold pattern of the dress. 150 BCE

=== Yaksha Manibhadra from Padmavati Pawaya ===
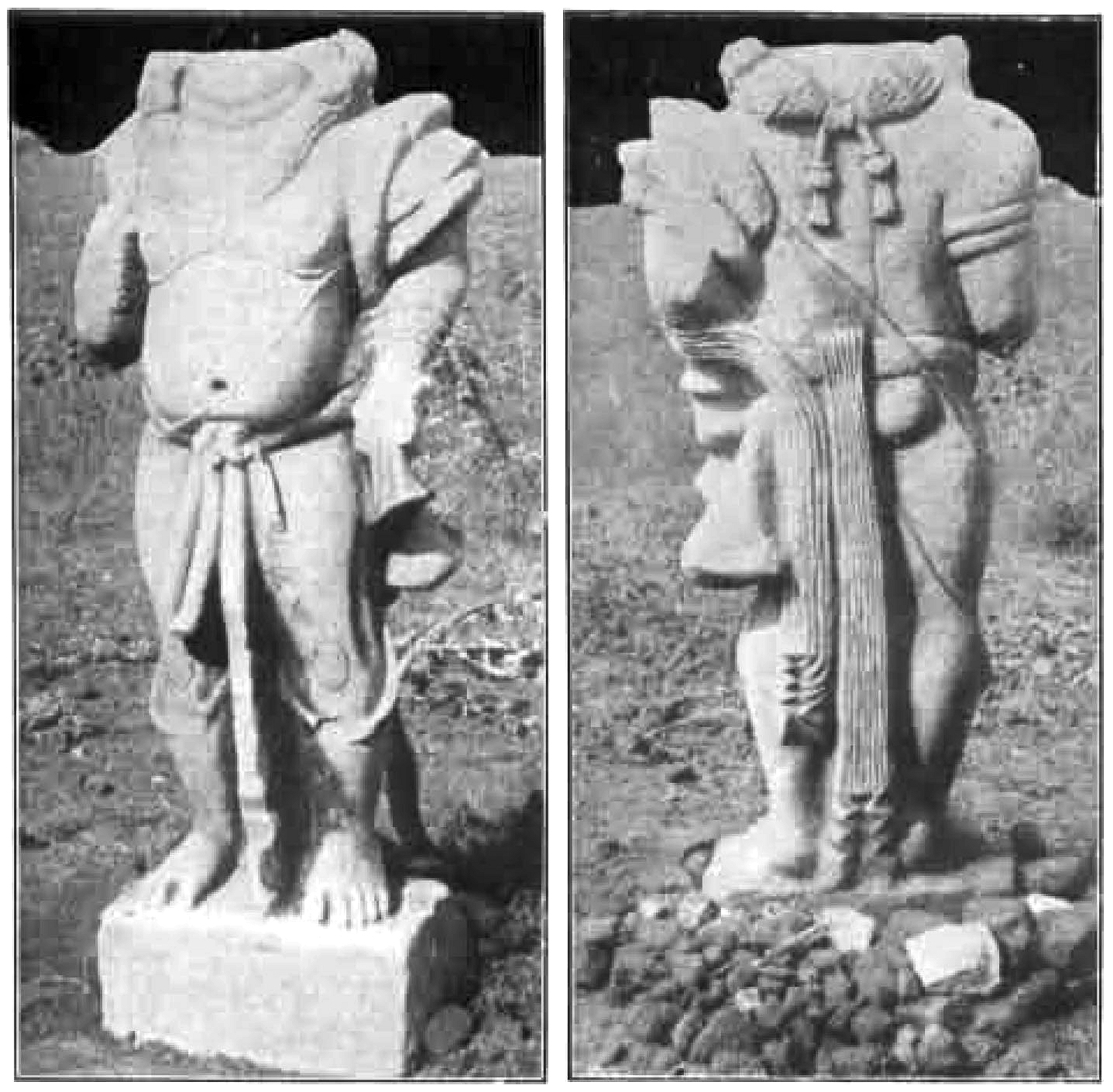
Manibhadra image at Pawaya

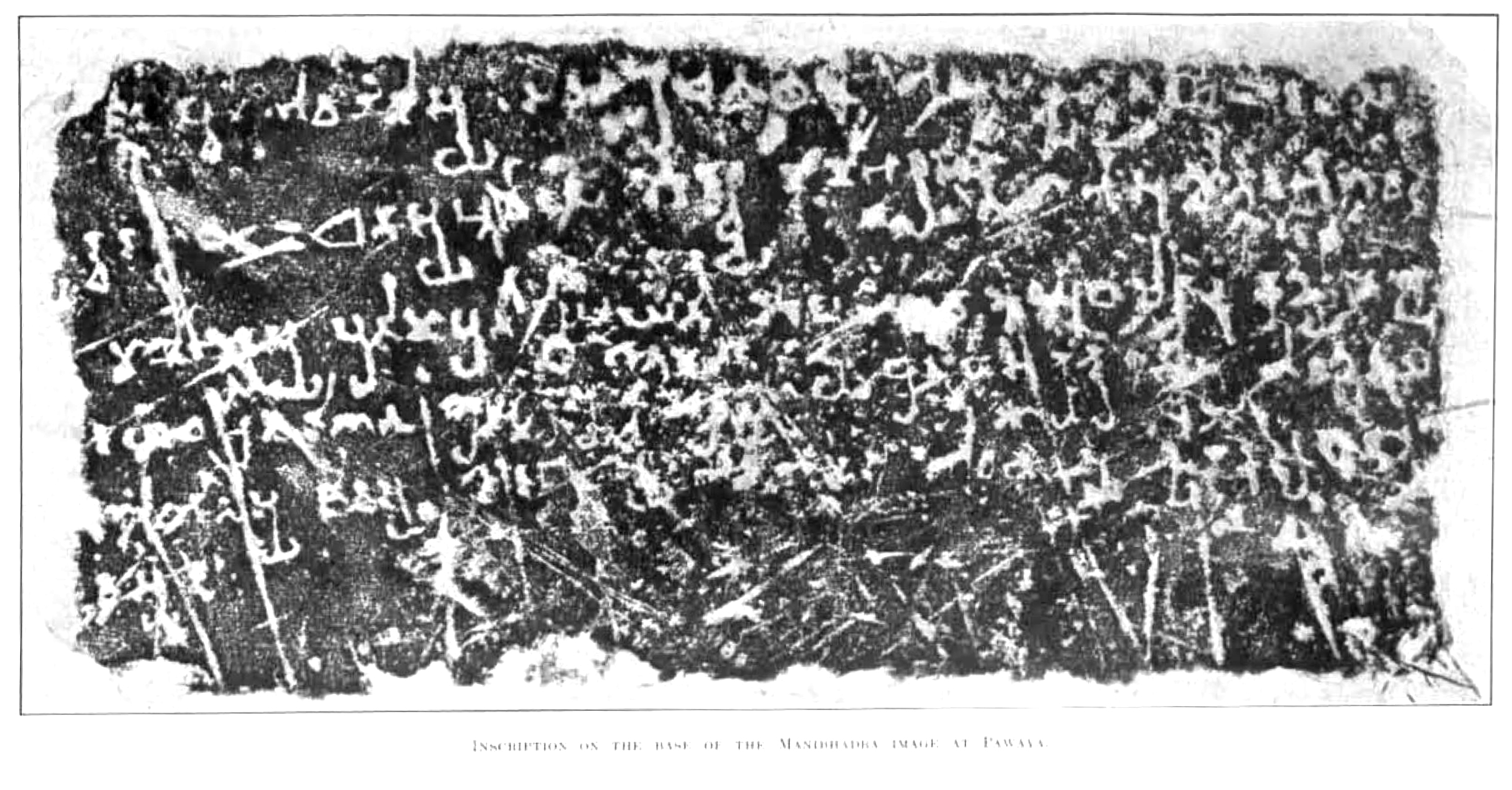
Inscription on the base of the image of Manibhadra at Pawaya.

- Yaksha Manibhadra from Padmavati Pawaya. The inscription under the image mentions a group of Manibhadra worshippers.

Both of them are monumental larger than life sculptures, often dated to Maurya or Shunga period. The Parkham Yaksha was used an inspiration by Ram Kinker Baij to carve the Yaksha image that now stands in front of the Reserve Bank of India in Delhi.

Manibhadra was often shown with a bag of money in his hand.

== Hinduism ==
Manibhadra is stated to be a son of Kubera and his wife, Bhadra. He is described to have a brother named Nalakuvara. In the Ramayana, Manibhadra fought with Ravana to defend Lanka, but failed. In the Mahabharata, Manibhadra is mentioned along with Kubera as a chief of the yakshas. Arjuna is stated to have worshipped him. The Bhagavata Purana narrates a story about the brothers. Once, Manibhadra and Nalakuvara were playing with their respective wives or apsaras in the river Ganges. They were drunk and nude. When the divine sage, Narada, passed by to visit Vishnu, the women covered themselves, but the nude brothers were too intoxicated to see the sage and started to boast about themselves. Narada wanted to teach the brothers a lesson and cursed them to be turned into trees and only to be liberated by Vishnu's avatar. During the Dvapara Yuga, an infant Krishna was tied to a mortar by his mother, Yashoda, as a punishment for eating dirt. Krishna crawled with the mortar, which became stuck between two trees. Krishna, using his divine powers, uprooted the trees, liberating Nalakuvara and Manibhadra from their curse.

=== Other legends ===
Another figure with the same name is mentioned to be an avatar of Shiva which he called when he was angry and summoned for warfare. Manibhadra decimated the army of Jalandhara along with Virabhadra, another avatar of Shiva. It is possible that the avatar of Shiva and the chief of the yakshas may be the same Manibhadra but there is no confirmation. Manibhadra is also a god of sea-farers especially merchants venturing out in the sea for business in faraway lands.

== Buddhism ==
In Samyukta Nikaya, Manibhadra is said to reside in the Manimala chaitya in Magadha. Yaksha Manibhadra is invoked in The Exalted Manibhadra’s Dhārani.

== Jainism ==
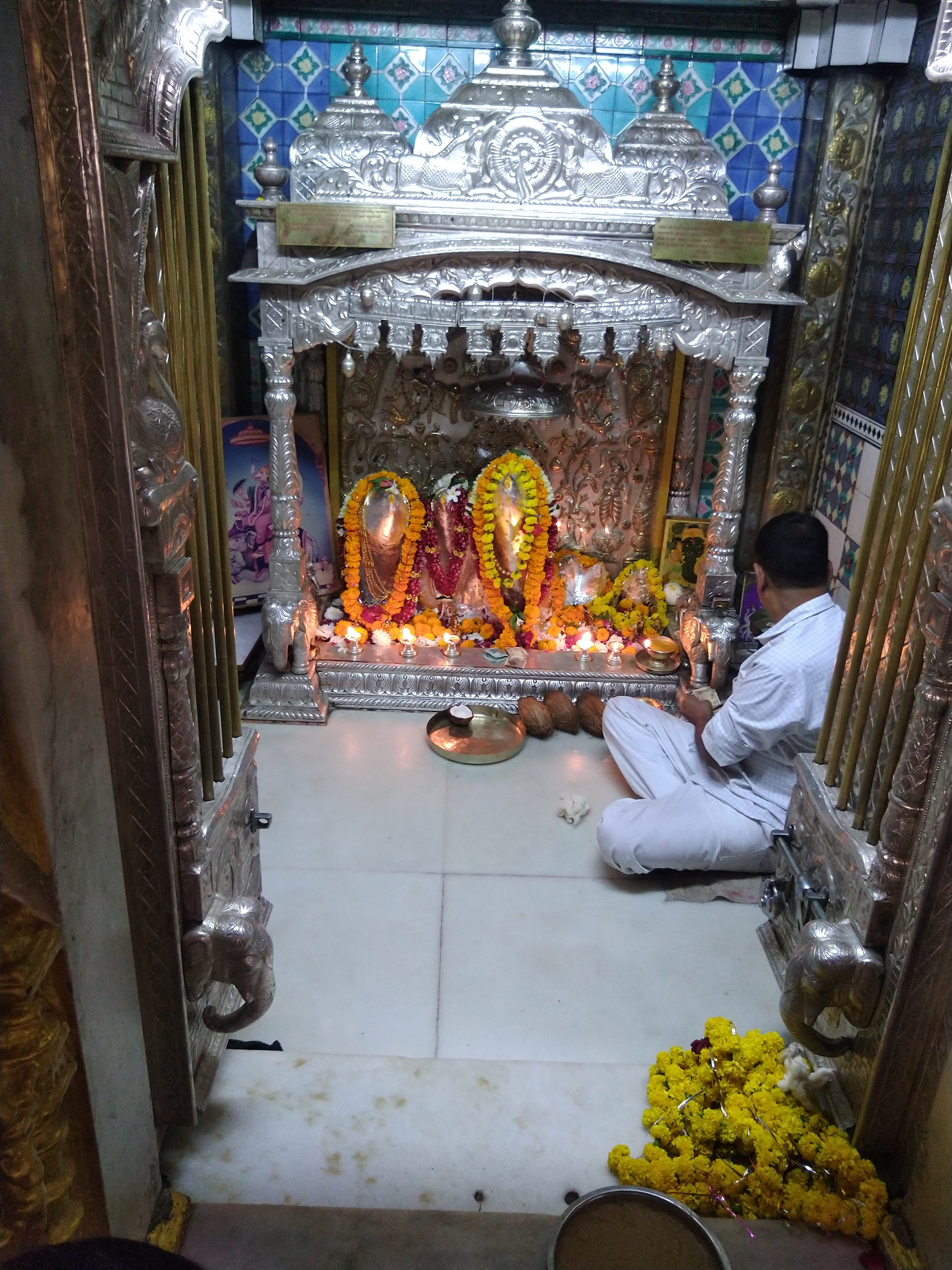
Manibhadra Temple, Magarwada

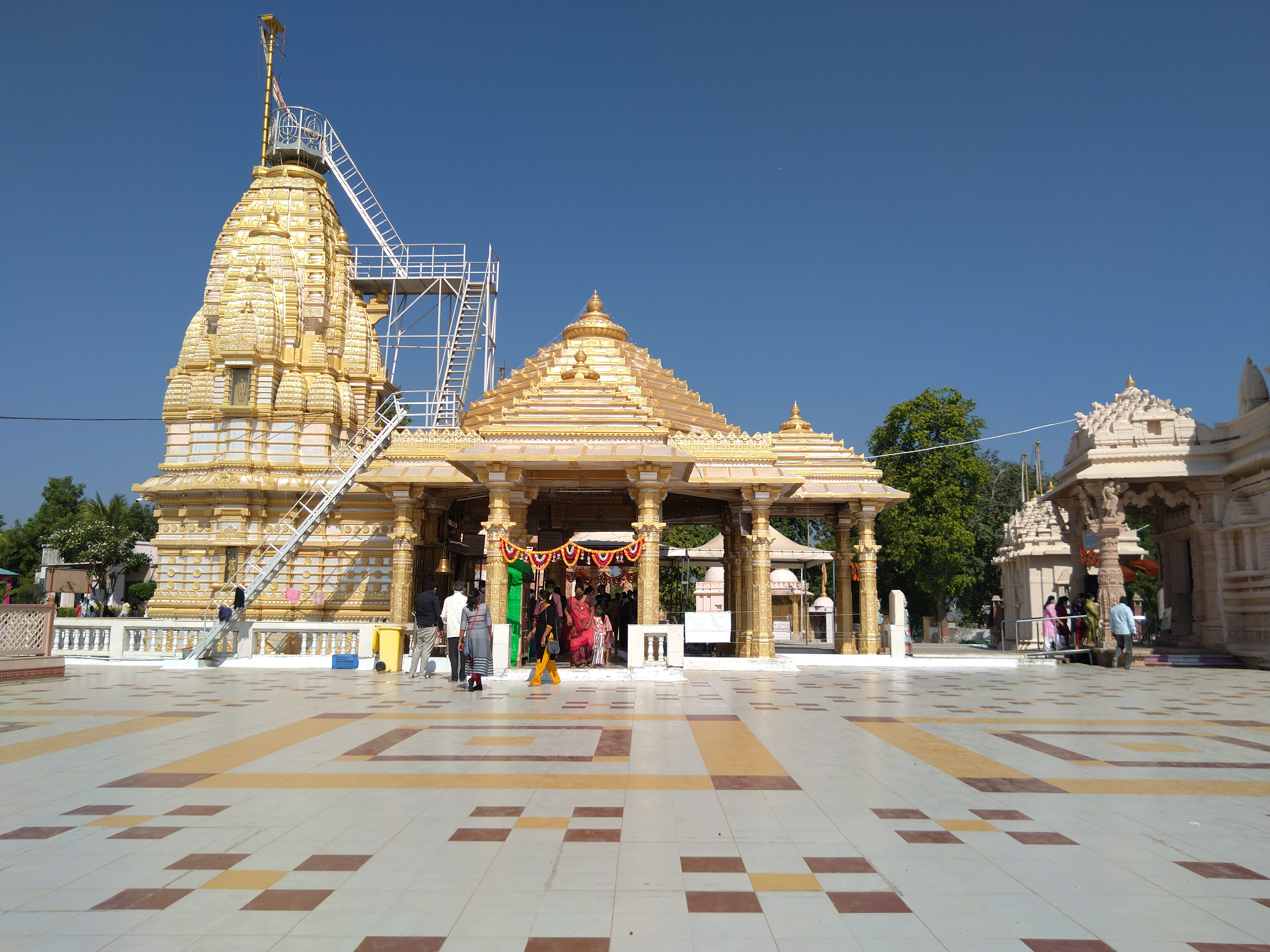
Manibhadra Temple, Aglod

In Sūryaprajñapti, a Manibhadra chairya in Mithila is mentioned. Yakshas are referred to in the Harivamsa Purana (783 A.D.) of Jinasena made the beginning of this concept. Among them, Manibhadra and Purnabadra yakshas and Bahuputrika yakshini have been the most popular. Manibhadra and Purnabadra yakshas are mentioned a chief of yakshas, Manibhadra of Northern ones and Purnabadra of Southern ones.

Manibhadra Vir still a yaksha worshipped by the Jains, specially those affiliated with the Tapa Gachchha. Three temples are famous for association with Mandibhadra: Ujjain, Aglod (Mehsana) and Magarwada (Banaskantha). Manibhadra Yaksha (or Vira) is a popular demigod among the Jains in Gujarat. His image can take many forms, including unshaped rocks, however in the most common representation, he is shown with a multi-tusked elephant Airavata.

== See also ==
- Kubera
- Pañcika
- Yaksha
