= Adbhuta Ramayana =

Śāktaḥ Sanskrit work

The Adbhuta Ramayana is a Śāktaḥ Sanskrit work. It is considerably less popular than both the Valmiki Ramayana as well as Tulsidas’ Awadhi version entitled Ramacharitamanasa, northern India's most popular version of the Ramayana story.

Scholarly analysis of its content and text history has, to this point, been minor. Its significance lies in its traditional place in the body of Ramayana literature. It is not to be confused with the Kannada prose work of the same name by Nandalike Lakshminarayana.

The Adbhuta Ramayana is composed in 27 sargas of various metres, and only briefly recounts the traditional Rama narrative. The earliest episodes of Rama's life, as depicted in Valmiki’s original telling—such as the story of Rama's birth, his training with Vishvamitra, and the breaking of Shiva’s bow at Sita’s svayamvara—are omitted. This adaptation of Rama's life begins with his confrontation with Parashurama as he and his family returned from his wedding in Janakpura. The story glosses over other noteworthy events of the epic, focusing more on supportive stories intended to elaborate upon the major themes of Valmiki's primary work.

Sita is accorded far more prominence in this variant of the Ramayana narrative, and indeed two of its most notable contributions are an elaboration of the events surrounding her birth—in this case to Ravana’s wife, Mandodari—as well as her conquest of Ravana's older brother in the form of Mahakali.

== Summary ==
=== Sarga 1 ===
The rishi Bharadvaja approached Valmiki and asked him to narrate the story of Rama, reminding him that the Ramayana includes hundreds of thousands of shlokas (verses), most of which have been unavailable. Bharadvaja asked to hear one of those secret stories, to which Valmiki agreed, noting that this version would emphasize the deeds of Sita, the incarnation of Prakriti (nature). Valmiki emphasized, however, that Rama was the manifestation of the supreme, and that ultimately there is no distinction between Rama and Sita—they are one.

=== Sarga 2 ===
Parabrahma, the Supreme Being, has three forms, Brahma, Vishnu and Shiva. King Ambarisha was a great devotee of Vishnu, and one day Vishnu offered him a boon. Ambarisha asked that he always remain absorbed in the supreme bliss of Vishnu (tvayi Vishno paranande nityam me varttatam matih), vowing in return that he would defend all of Vishnu's devotees. Vishnu was pleased and granted the boon, promising that his divine discus would always protect the king.

=== Sarga 3 ===
Ambarisha had a daughter named Shrimati (she was an avatar of Lakshmi, who later took the form of Sita), who was beautiful and famous for her virtues and good qualities. The sages Narada and Parvata each desired her for a wife (they did not know Shrimati's true form), and so Ambarisha—unable to choose one without incurring the wrath of the other—arranged her svayamvara so that she could decide who should be her husband. Narada and Parvata then independently approached Vishnu, asking for each other to unknowingly appear in the disguise of a monkey, which only Shrimati could see. Vishnu agreed to both, and the two sages proceeded to Shrimati's svayamvara.

=== Sarga 4 ===
Narada and Parvata attended the svayamvara, both appearing to Shrimati as monkeys, but each imagining himself handsome and irresistible. Vishnu then disguised himself as a human, sitting between them. Shrimati saw the monkey-faced sages before her but of course did not recognize them as Narada and Parvata, and so was surprised when there was no sign of either sage. And so she chose the handsome youth between the two monkey-faced men.

Narada and Parvata then realized what Vishnu had done and cursed him to be born on earth as a human, and to roam the forests searching for his wife—Shrimati reborn, who would be abducted by an evil being. Vishnu accepted, saying that he would be born as Rama, the son of Dasharatha. In the form of Rama, he would also forget about his divinity, his omnipotence and his infinite powers. However, around true devotees, like Parashurama (another avatar) and Hanuman (avatar of Shiva), he might remember his true form temporarily.

=== Sarga 5 ===
The Sage Kaushika became famous for his devotional songs, glorifying the greatness of Vishnu. His reputation spread far and wide, and many devotees from every caste became his disciple. His fame spread to the king of Kalinga, who demanded that Kaushika sing devotional songs to him rather than to Vishnu. Kaushika insisted that he could only praise Vishnu, and his disciples held that they could only listen to praises of Vishnu. The king became angry, took away their property, and banished them from the kingdom. When the end of their lives finally arrived, they departed to Satyaloka, the world of Brahma, who took them to Vishnuloka, the abode of Vishnu, where they lived eternally.

=== Sarga 6 ===
Vishnu once organized a great festival in honour of Kaushika, featuring many beautiful songs. Millions of celestial maidens attended, as well as Lakshmi, the consort of Vishnu, with her retinue of maid servants. When the featured singer Tumburu was accorded great honour and praise, Narada was offended; and when one of Lakshmi’s maids slighted Narada, he cursed Lakshmi to be born on earth in the form of a rakshasi (demoness). When Narada's anger subsided, he became remorseful, and soon thereafter Vishnu and Lakshmi came to assuage his sorrow. Vishnu recommended to Narada that if he wanted to be accorded the same respect as Tumburu, he should study singing with the great Uluka (a being with the form of an owl) known as Ganabandhu, a master of devotional singing.

=== Sarga 7 ===
This sarga outlines the basic rules of expert singing. Narada had learned the skill of singing, and imagining himself an expert, he proceeded to the abode of Tumburu to better him. At Tumburu's home, he was confronted by a collection of beings with mutilated bodies, who explained that they were the embodiments of the musical notes that had been mutilated by Narada's inept singing. Narada realized that he was the victim of his own inflated pride, and sought Vishnu's advice.

Vishnu suggested that he wander as a gandharva celestial musician singing the praises of the deity until the time of Vishnu's incarnation as Krishna. At that time, he should remind Vishnu (as Krishna) of the incident. When Vishnu came to earth as Krishna and was reminded, he sent Narada to various experts until his command of music was almost perfected. Then Krishna himself taught him the best forms of devotional music and song.

=== Sarga 8 ===
Ravana performed great tapas (austerities) to please Brahma, the creator. When Brahma granted him a boon, he requested eternal life, but Brahma indicated that this was not possible. Ravana then asked that he be invulnerable to the deities, rakshasas, yakshas, and many other celestial beings; but he did not include humans in the list as they were, in his view, of no consequence. He also asked that he perish should he make advances towards his own daughter.

Emboldened by Brahma's boon, Ravana began his attempts to conquer the three worlds, but his reckless behavior set in motion the events leading to the birth of Sita from his wife Mandodari.

The sarga ends with Janaka’s discovery of Sita in a field while preparing the ground for his yajna.

=== Sarga 9 ===
The re-telling of the traditional story of Rama begins with Rama's confrontation with Parashurama while he was returning to Ayodhya from his marriage to Sita. Parashurama had heard that Rama had broken Shiva’s bow (Pinaka) and had come to test him. After strong words between them, Rama strung an arrow on Parashurama's bow, and while shooting it in the direction of Parashurama, he showed his cosmic form as the supreme being. At that moment, the earth shook with great peals of thunder, and flashes of lightning lit the sky. Parashurama, recognizing that Rama was indeed the incarnation of Vishnu, bowed to him and returned to Mt. Mahendra to perform tapas.

=== Sarga 10 ===
The story quickly moves forward to Sita's abduction by Ravana following Rama's exile into the Dandaka forest. Upon meeting Hanuman, Rama briefly showed him his cosmic form as Vishnu, with Lakshmi. Lakshmana revealed his form as Shesha, the cobra upon whom Vishnu rests; Shesha is a form of Vishnu himself and also known as Shankarshana. In turn, Hanuman revealed his true nature, though the text does not elaborate upon his true nature (atmanam darshayamasa Hanuman Ramalakshmanau). However, it can be guessed that Hanuman showed the form of Rudra or Shiva.

=== Sarga 11 ===
Rama (temporarily remembered his true form) reveals to Hanuman the fundamental tenets of Yoga and Samkhya philosophies, emphasizing their fundamental unity. In his discussion of Atma, which must be understood through the path of jnana as well as experienced through yoga, Rama revealed his own identity with Atma.

=== Sarga 12 ===
Rama continues his philosophical discourse.

=== Sarga 13 ===
Rama continues his discourse, identifying himself with that entity of which he has been speaking—that from which the entire creation emerges.

=== Sarga 14 ===
Rama continues speaking to Hanuman about himself as the progenitor of creation, and all that is, was, and will be.

=== Sarga 15 ===
Hanuman, meditating upon the form of Rama in his heart, expressed his devotion to Rama as atma, purusha, hiranyagarbha, the source of all creation, and then bowed to him.

=== Sarga 16 ===
In twenty verses, Rama explains his need to find Ravana and Sita, his departure to Lanka, his conquest of Ravana, and his triumphant return to Ayodhya.

=== Sarga 17 ===
In the court of Ayodhya, in the presence of saints and seers, Sita noted that the slaying of Ravana was not that big a deal. When she was very young living in her father's home in Janakpura, a Brahmin had passed through and told her of Ravana's older brother Sahasra Ravana, who had two thousand arms and a thousand heads, lived on an island named Pushkara, and was originally much more powerful than his younger brother. However, since Ravana had Brahma’s boon and Shiva's blessings, he had gained immense power.

=== Sarga 18 ===
Rama collected his army of monkeys, men, and rakshasas, and departed to conquer Sahasra Ravana. Sahasra Ravana was surprised to see Rama's army deployed against him, but quickly assembled his hordes of rakshasas. This sarga describes the rakshasa army commanders and their weapons in detail.

=== Sarga 19 ===
A continuation, enumerating the participants in the forthcoming battle.

=== Sarga 20 ===
The battle begins, a closely fought encounter in which the monkeys gain the upper hand.

=== Sarga 21 ===
Sahasra Ravana, seeing Rama's army on the verge of victory, decided to participate. Employing the vayavastra weapon, he dispersed Rama's army to the places from which they came: the men to Ayodhya, monkeys to Kishkindha, and the rakshasas to Lanka. Rama was angry, and prepared to engage Sahasra Ravana.

=== Sarga 22 ===
In their first one-on-one encounter, a fierce and unrelenting battle, Rama employed the Brahmastra, given to him by Agastya. Sahasra Ravana grabbed it with his hand and snapped it in two as though it were straw, dismaying Rama. Rama was overconfident that he could beat Sahasra Ravana very easily, but it was not so easy, and Rama became absent-minded. Taking the advantage of absent-minded Rama, Sahasra Ravana then shot his own arrow at Rama, rendering him unconscious and bringing widespread consternation.

=== Sarga 23 ===
Seeing Rama unconscious on the field, Sita got angry, and giving up her human appearance, she took on the form of Mahakali (the goddess of time and death). Instantly, she severed Sahasra Ravana's 1,000 heads and began destroying rakshasas everywhere. Innumerable mother goddess came to the battlefield to join Mahakali, playing with the heads of rakshasas. The earth shook and almost sank into the netherworld, but was rescued by Shiva disguised as a corpse.

=== Sarga 24 ===
Realizing that the earth might be destroyed if Sita as Mahakali did not calm down, the deities came to appease her. They exclaimed that only through shakti does the Supreme Being become accessible. She pointed to the unconscious Rama, making clear that because he was unconscious, she could not consider the world's welfare. Brahma restored Rama's consciousness, but as he regained awareness, he was frightened of Sita's horrific form. Brahma explained to Rama that she had taken this form to highlight the fact that everything he does—the creation and destruction of the universe, and all other activities can only be accomplished in association with her, with shakti. Rama was satisfied, and his fears allayed.

=== Sarga 25 ===
Brahma assured Rama that the horrific form before him was indeed Sita, and so he asked her who she really was. She explained that she was the entity within everyone, known as Shiva, who can take one across the ocean of samsara. She then gave Rama “celestial sight” so that he could perceive her divine state (due to Narada and Parvata's curse, Rama forgot that he was the Supreme Being and thus Sahasra Ravana could make him unconscious and he needed celestial sight to see Sita's divine form). Seeing her true nature, he was thrilled, and praised her by reciting her 1,008 names.

=== Sarga 26 ===
Rama continued to praise her, and at his request, she reverted to her form as Sita. They then prepared to return to Ayodhya.

=== Sarga 27 ===
Rama and Sita mounted the car known as pushpaka and soon arrived in Ayodhya. Once there, he narrated the story of the elder Ravana's defeat to everyone. They then bade farewell to Sugriva and his army of monkeys, as well as to Vibhishana and his army of rakshasas. The sarga concludes with a brief re-counting of Rama's story and an ennumeration of the merits and benefits of hearing the story of the Adbhuta Ramayana (also known as the Adbhutottara Kandam).
