= Nalakubara =

Son of Kubera in Hinduism

- God of Desire
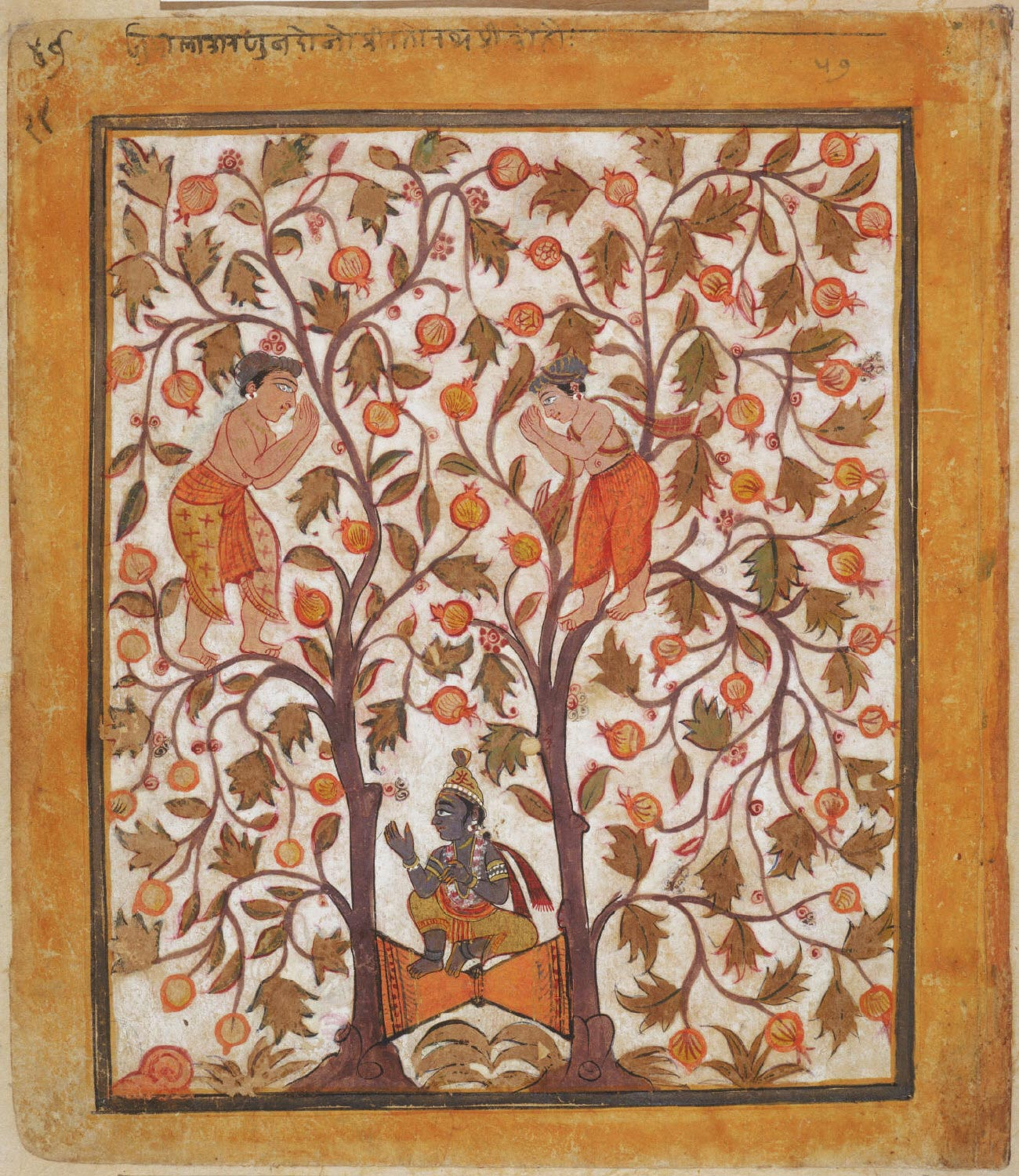
- Krishna liberates Nalakuvara and Manibhadra from their curse.
- Other names: Nalakubera, Kuberaputra, Mayuraja, Kamayaksha
- Affiliation: Deva, Yaksha
- Abode: Alakapuri
- Mantra: Om Kuberaputra Kamyukshaha Nalakubera Namah
- Weapon: Bow and Arrow
- Symbol: Cashewnut
- Day: Monday
- Mount: Parrot

Genealogy
- Parents: Kubera (father); Bhadra (mother)
- Siblings: Manibhadra
- Consort: Rambha and Priti (love partners) Somaprabhā,Ratnamala,Chandrini and Padmini (wives)
- Children: Sumita by Rambha and Chitrangadata by Priti (sons)

Nalakuvara, also known as Nalakubara (Sanskrit: नलकूबर, romanized: Nalakūbara), appears in Hindu and Buddhist mythology as the brother of Manigriva (also known as Manibhadra), the son of the yaksha king Kubera (also known as Vaishravana), and husband of Rambha and Ratnamala. Nalakuvara often appears as a sexual trickster figure in Hindu and Buddhist literature.

== Names ==
Various Sanskrit and Prakrit texts offer the name "Nalakuvara", "Nalakūvala", "Mayuraja", "Narakuvera", and "Naṭakuvera" to describe the son of Kubera. The god also appears in Chinese texts as "Nazha", and later "Nezha", a shortened transliteration of the word "Nalakuvara".

== Legend ==
=== Hinduism ===
==== Ramayana ====
In the Ramayana, Nalakuvara's, first wife, Rambha, was sexually assaulted by his uncle, Ravaṇa. In the Valmiki Ramayana, Nalakuvara curses Ravana that he would never be able to approach another youthful woman unless she shares his love; if, carried away by lust, he does violence to any woman who does not love him, his head would split into seven pieces. This curse protected the chastity of Sita, the wife of Rama, after she was kidnapped by Ravana.

==== Bhagavata Purana ====
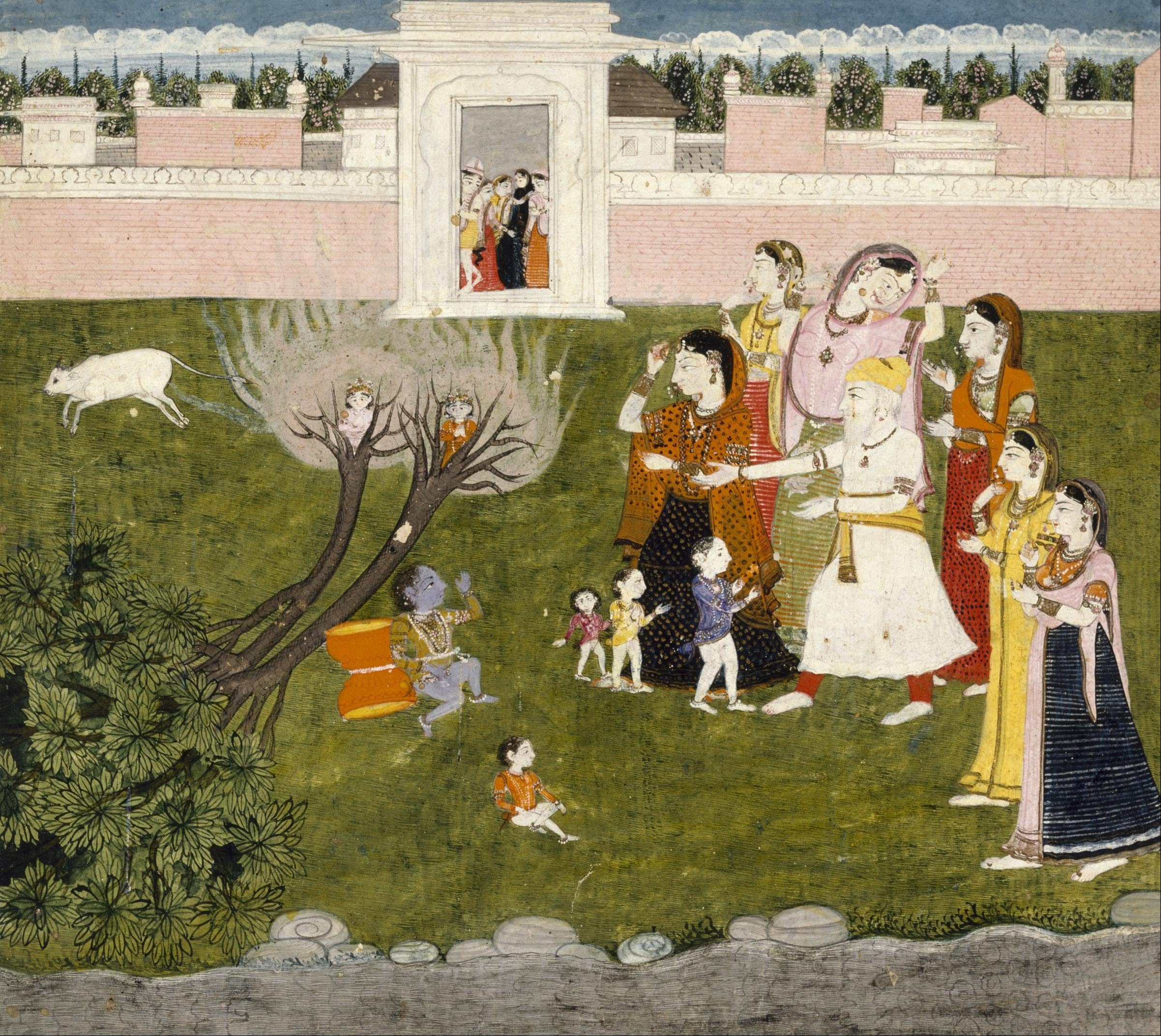
Krishna frees the brothers from the curse.

In the Bhagavata Purana, Nalakuvara, and his brother Manigriva, are cursed by the sage Narada into becoming trees. They are later liberated by the child-god Krishna.

Nalakuvera and Manigriva were playing, in the nude, in the Ganges, with apsaras, when Narada walked by after a visit with Vishnu. Upon seeing Narada, the maidens covered themselves, while Nalakuvara and Manigriva were too intoxicated to notice Narada, and remained unclothed. According to some accounts, Narada pitied the brothers for wasting away their lives through their excessive indulgence in women and wine. In order to help the brothers realise their mistake, Narada cursed them into two Arjuna trees. Narada wished for the brothers to meet Krishna after many years, who would be able to liberate them from the curse. In other accounts, it is said that Narada is so offended by the brothers’ lack of dignity and respect, that he cursed them into trees. After the two brothers pleaded with Narada, he consented that they could be liberated if Krishna touched them.

Many years later, when Krishna was in his infancy, his foster-mother Yashoda had tied him to a mortar in order to prevent him from eating dirt. Krishna dragged the mortar along the ground until it became wedged between two trees. These trees happened to be Nalakuvara and Manigriva, and upon contact, they returned to their original forms. The brothers then paid homage to Krishna, apologised for their previous mistakes, and departed.

=== Buddhism ===
In the Kākāti Jātaka story, Nalakuvara (here Naṭakuvera), appears as the court musician of the king of Benares. After the King's wife, Queen Kākātī, is kidnapped by the Garuḍa King, the King of Benares sends Naṭakuvera to look for her. Naṭakuvera hides within the plumage of the Garuḍa King, who carries Naṭakuvera to his nest. Once he has arrived, Naṭakuvera has sex with Queen Kākātī. Afterwards Naṭakuvera returned to Benares in the Garuḍa's wing, and composed a song telling of his experiences with Kākātī. When the Garuḍa hears the song, he realises that he has been tricked, he brings Kākātī back home to her husband.

Tantric masters invoked Nalakuvara as the commander of Kubera's army of yakṣas. He appears in the tantric text "Great Peacock-Queen Spell," which portrays him as a heroic yakṣa general and invokes Nalakūvara's name as a way to cure snakebites. Some versions of the "Great Peacock-Queen Spell" (Mahāmāyūrīvidyārājñī and the "Amogha-pāśa" give Nalakuvara the title "Great Yakṣa General." Nalakuvara appears in two other tantric texts: "The Yakṣa Nartakapara’s Tantra," and "The Great Yakṣa General Natakapara’s Tantric Rituals."

== Worship in East Asia ==
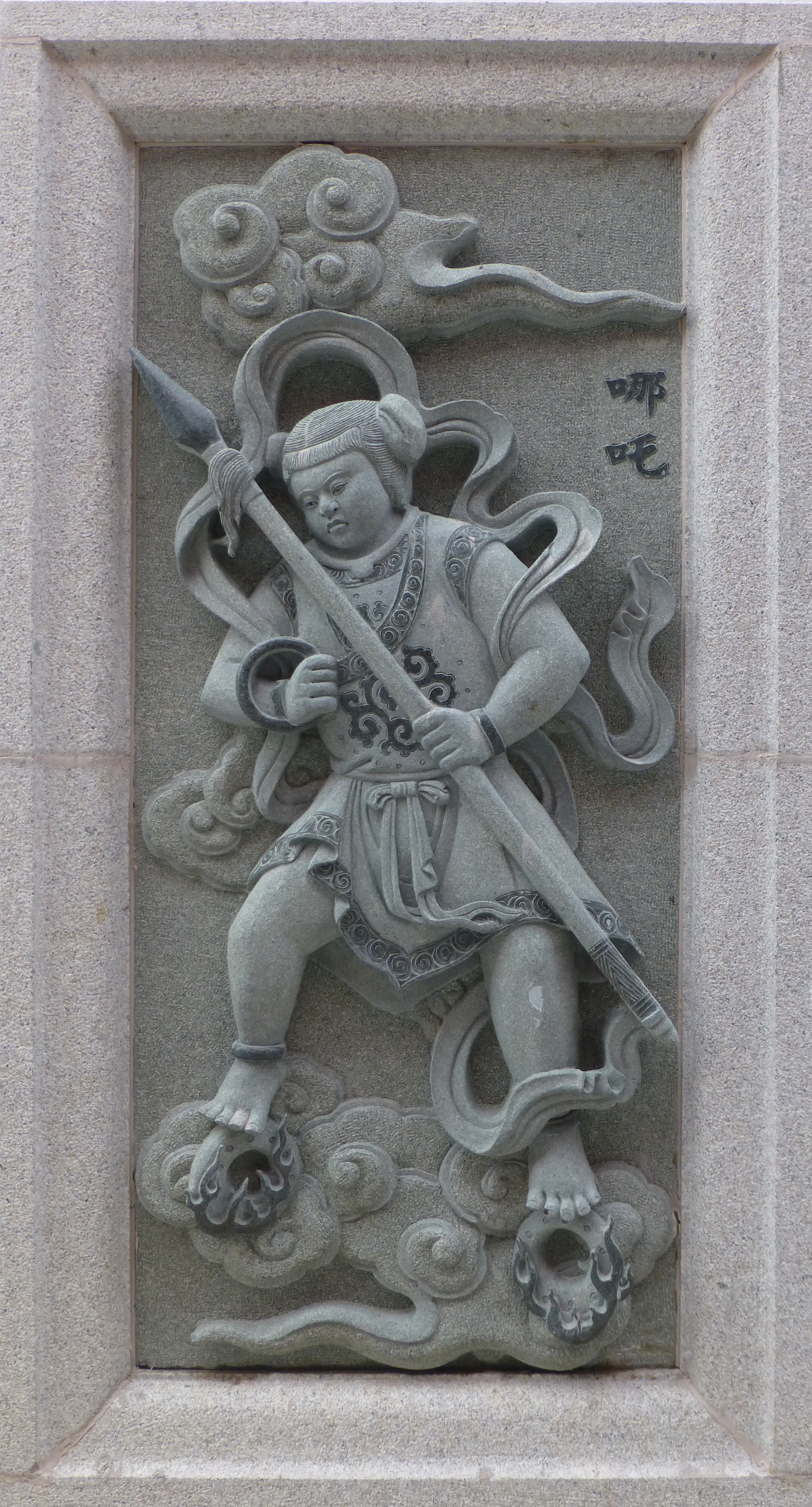
Nezha (on the left) in Fengshen Yanyi

Nalakuvara was transmitted through Buddhist texts into China, where he became known as Nezha (known earlier as Nazha). In Chinese mythology, Nezha is the third son of the Tower King, so many people also called Nezha as the third prince. Nezha is also called "Marshal of the Central Altar".

According to Meir Shahar, the etymology of the word “Nezha” showed that the name is a shortened (and slightly corrupted) transcription of the Sanskrit name "Nalakūbara." It has been suggested by Shahar that the legends surrounding Nezha are a combination of the mythology of Nalakuvara and the child-god Krishna (Bala Krishna).

Nezha is a well-known Daoist deity in Japan. The Japanese refer to Nezha as Nataku or Nata, which came from the readings of Journey to the West

== See also ==
- Kubera
- Manibhadra
- Ravana
