= Edward Washburn Hopkins =

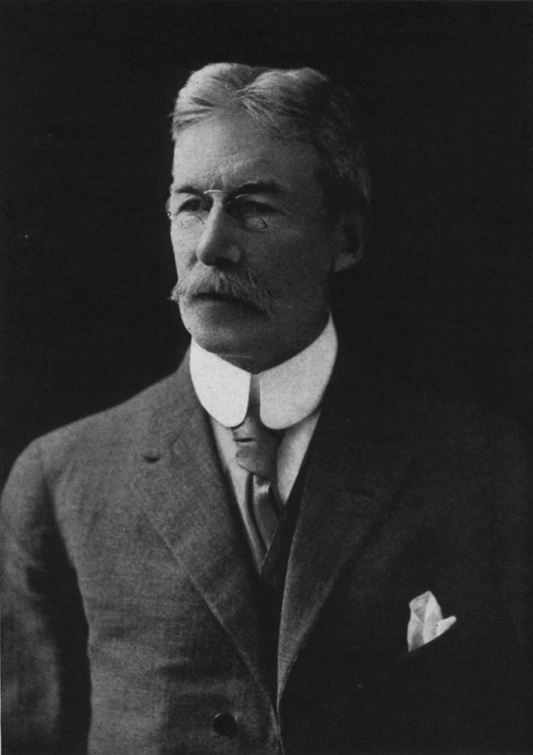
- Born: September 8, 1857; Northampton, Massachusetts
- Died: July 16, 1932 (aged 74); Cambridge, Massachusetts
- Education: Columbia College, Leipzig
- Known for: Sanskrit scholar and editor of the Journal of the American Oriental Society
- Spouse: Marry S. Clark
- Scientific career
- Fields: Sanskrit Language and Literature
- Workplaces: Yale University

Edward Washburn Hopkins, Ph.D., LL.D. (September 8, 1857 – July 16, 1932), an American Sanskrit scholar, was born in Northampton, Massachusetts.

He graduated at Columbia College in 1878, studied at Leipzig, where he received the degree of Ph.D. in 1881, was an instructor at Columbia (1881–1885), and professor at Bryn Mawr (1885–1895), and became professor of Sanskrit and comparative philology in Yale University in 1895.

He became secretary of the American Oriental Society and editor of the Journal of the American Oriental Society, to which he contributed many valuable papers, especially on numerical and temporal categories in early Sanskrit literature. He wrote:

- Caste in Ancient India (1881)
- Manu's Lawbook (1884)
- Religions of India (1895)
- The Great Epic of India (1901)
- India Old and New (1901)
- Epic Mythology (1915)
- History of Religions (1918)
- Origin and Evolution of Religion (1923)
- The Ethics of India (1924)
