= Kubera =

Hindu god of wealth

- God of Wealth; Treasurer of the Devas
- Member of Lokapalas
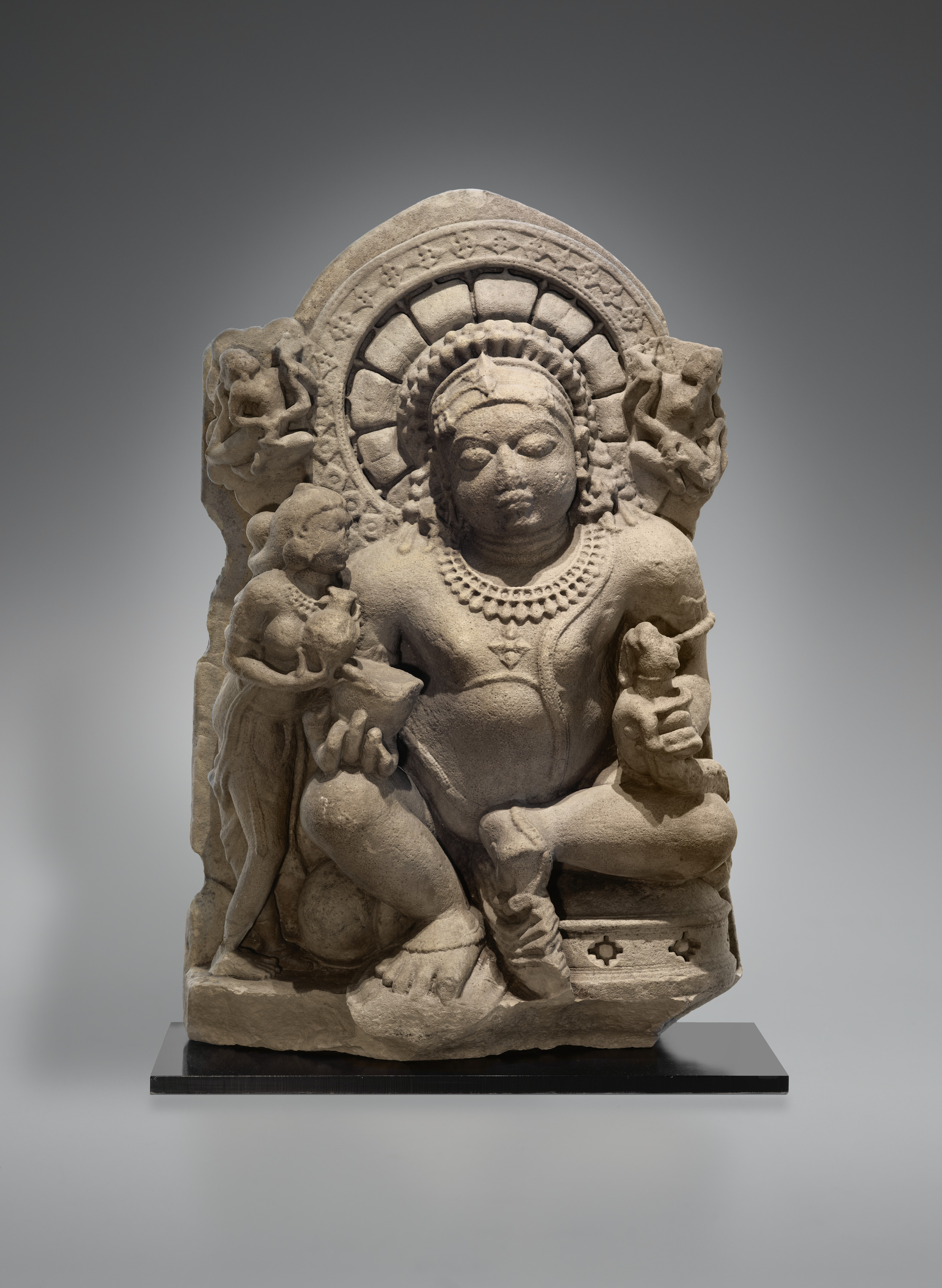
- 10th century sandstone sculpture of Kubera with his consort
- Affiliation: Yaksha, Deva, Lokapala
- Abode: Lanka and later Alaka
- Mantra: Oṃ Shaṃ Kuberāya Namaḥ
- Weapon: Gadā (Mace or club)
- Mount: Mongoose,Human

Genealogy
- Parents: Vishrava (father); Ilavida (mother)
- Siblings: Ravana, Kumbhakarna
- Consort: Bhadra (Lakshmi)
- Children: Nalakuvara, Manibhadra, Mayuraja, and Minakshi

Kubera (Sanskrit: कुबेर, IAST: Kuvera) also known as Kuvera, Kuber and Kuberan, is the god of wealth, and the god-king of the semi-divine yakshas in Hinduism. He is regarded as the regent of the north (Dikpala), and a protector of the world (Lokapala). His many epithets extol him as the overlord of numerous semi-divine species, and the owner of the treasures of the world. Kubera is often depicted with a plump body, adorned with jewels, and carrying a money-pot and a club.

Originally described as the chief of evil spirits in Vedic-era texts, Kubera acquired the status of a deva (god) only in the Puranas and the Hindu epics. The scriptures describe that Kubera once ruled Lanka, but was overthrown by his half-brother Ravana, later settling in the city of Alaka in the Himalayas. Descriptions of the "glory" and "splendour" of Kubera's city are found in many scriptures.

Kubera has also been assimilated into the Buddhist and Jain pantheons. In Buddhism, he is known as Vaisravana, the patronymic used of the Hindu Kubera and is also equated with Pañcika, while in Jainism, he is known as Sarvanubhuti.

== Iconography ==
Kubera is often depicted as a dwarf, with complexion of lotus leaves and a big belly. He is described as having three legs, only eight teeth, one eye, and being adorned with jewels. He is sometimes described riding a man. The description of deformities like the broken teeth, three legs, three heads and four arms appear only in the later Puranic texts. Kubera holds a mace, a pomegranate, or a money bag in his hand. He may also carry a sheaf of jewels or a mongoose with him. In Tibet, the mongoose is considered a symbol of Kubera's victory over nāgas—the guardians of treasures. Kubera is usually depicted with a mongoose in Buddhist iconography.

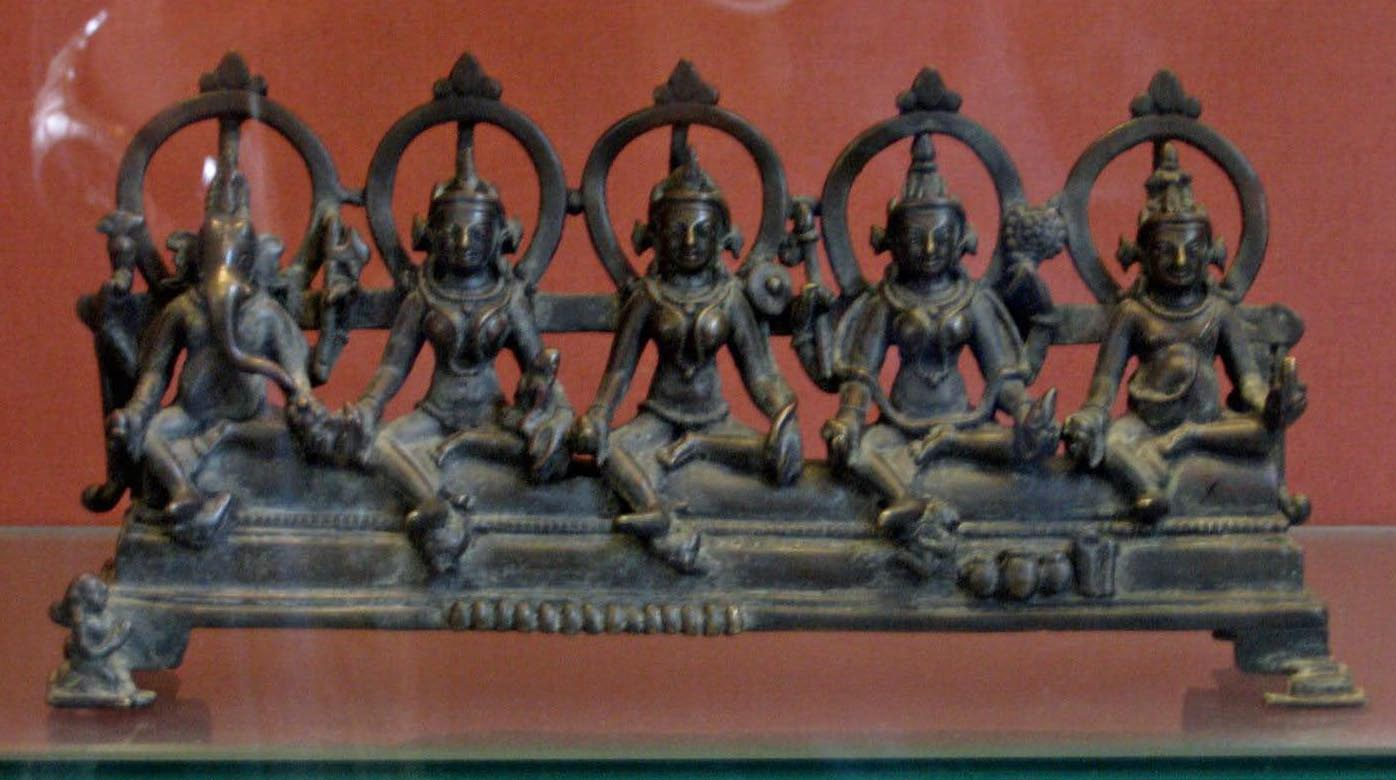
A bronze Matrika goddess group along with Ganesha (left) and Kubera (right) currently at the British Museum. Originally from Eastern India, it was dedicated in 43rd year of reign of Mahipala I (c. 1043 AD).

In the Vishnudharmottara Purana, Kubera is described as the embodiment of both Artha ("wealth, prosperity, glory") and Arthashastras, the treatises related to it—and his iconography mirrors it. Kubera's complexion is described as that of lotus leaves. He rides a man—the state personified, adorned in golden clothes and ornaments, symbolizing his wealth. His left eye is yellow. He wears an armour and a necklace down to his large belly. The Vishnudharmottara Purana further describes his face to be inclined to the left, sporting a beard and mustache, and with two small tusks protruding from the ends of his mouth, representing his powers to punish and to bestow favours. His wife Riddhi, representing the journey of life, is seated on his left lap, with her left hand on the back of Kubera and the right holding a ratna-patra (jewel-pot). Kubera should be four-armed, holding a gada (mace: symbol of dandaniti—administration of justice) and a shakti (power) in his left pair, and standards bearing a lion—representing Artha and a shibika (a club, the weapon of Kubera). The nidhi treasures Padma and Shankha stand beside him in human form, with their heads emerging from a lotus and a conch respectively.

The Agni Purana states that Kubera should be installed in temples as seated on a goat, and with a club in his hand. Kubera's image is prescribed to be that of gold, with multi-coloured attributes. In some sources, especially in Jain depictions, Kubera is depicted as a drunkard, signified by the "nectar vessel" in his hand.

== Etymology and other names ==
The exact origins of the name Kubera are unknown. "Kubera" or "Kuvera" (कुवेर) as spelt in later Sanskrit, means "deformed or monstrous" or "ill-shaped one"; indicating his deformities. Another theory suggests that Kubera may be derived from the verb root kumba, meaning to conceal. Kuvera is also split as ku (earth), and vira (hero).

As the son of Vishrava ("Fame"), Kubera is called Vaisravana (in the Pali language, Vessavana) and as the son of Ilavila, Ailavila. Vaisravana is sometimes translated as the "Son of Fame". The Sutta Nitapa commentary says that Vaisravana is derived from a name of Kubera's kingdom, Visana. Once, Kubera looked at Shiva and his wife Parvati with jealousy, so he lost one of his eyes. Parvati also turned this deformed eye yellow. So, Kubera gained the name Ekaksipingala ("one who has one yellow eye"). He is also called Bhutesha ("Lord of spirits") like Shiva. Kubera usually is drawn by spirits or men (nara), so is called Nara-vahana, one whose vahana (mount) is nara. Hopkins interprets naras as being water-spirits, although Mani translates nara as men. Kubera also rides the elephant called Sarvabhauma as a loka-pala. His garden is named Chaitraratha.

Kubera also enjoys the titles "king of the whole world", "king of kings" (Rajaraja), "Lord of wealth" (Dhanadhipati) and "giver of wealth" (Dhanada). His titles are sometimes related to his subjects: "king of yakshas" (Yaksharajan), "Lord of rakshasas" (Rakshasadhipati), "Lord of Guhyakas" (Guhyakadhipa), "king of Kinnaras"(Kinnararaja), "king of animals resembling men" (Mayuraja), and "king of men" (Nararaja). Kubera is also called Guhyadhipa ("Lord of the hidden"). The Atharvaveda calls him the "god of hiding".

== Literature ==
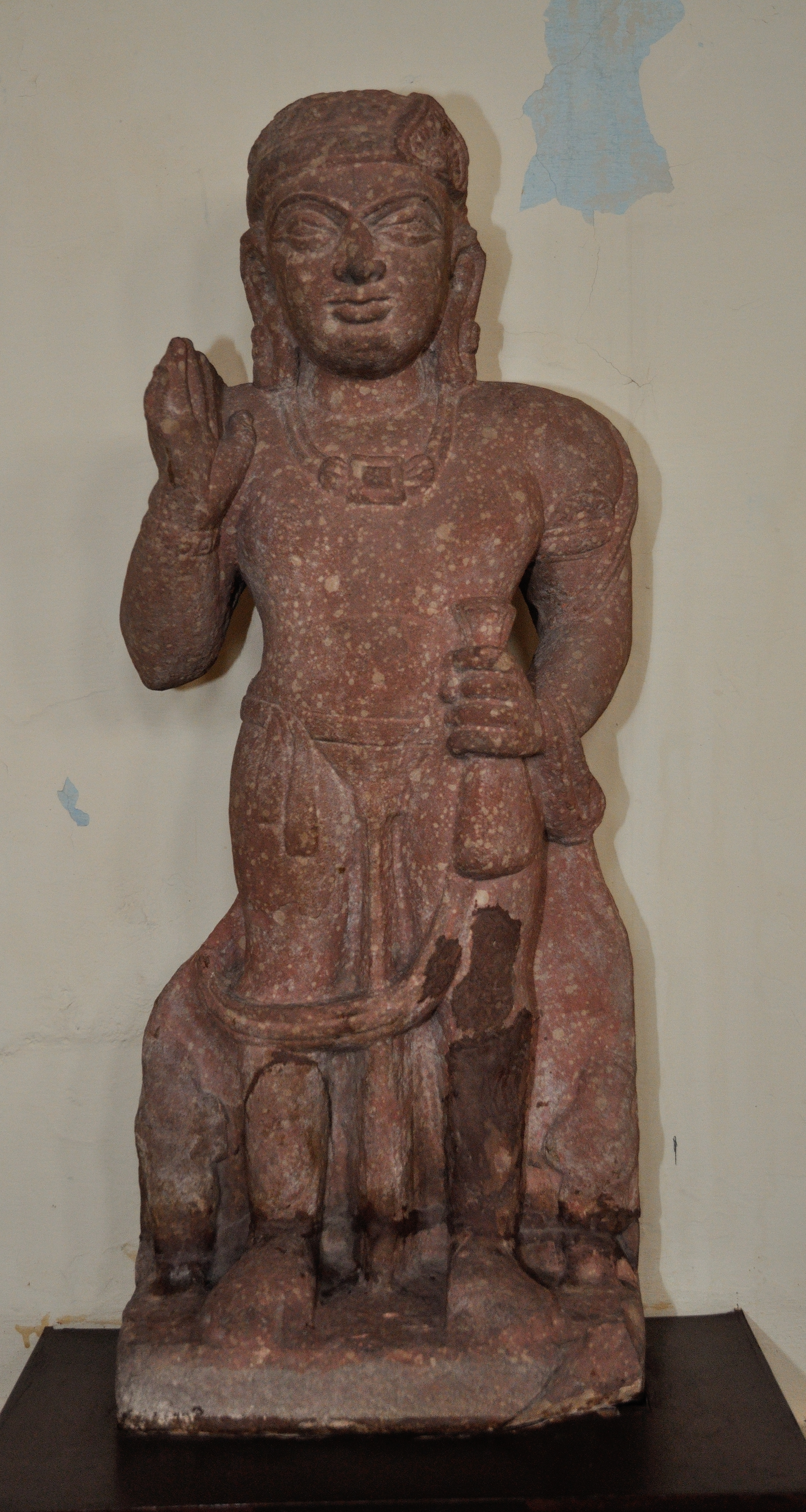
Kubera, 1st century CE, Mathura Museum.

=== Early descriptions and parentage ===
In the Atharvaveda—where he first appears—and the Shatapatha Brahmana, Kubera is the chief of evil spirits or spirits of darkness, and son of Vaishravana. The Shatapatha Brahmana calls him the Lord of thieves and criminals. In the Manusmriti, he becomes a respectable lokapala ("world protector") and the patron of merchants. In the epic Mahabharata, Kubera is described as the son of Prajapati Pulastya and his wife Idavida, and the brother of sage Vishrava. Kubera is described as born from a cow. However, from the Puranas, he is described as the grandson of Pulastya and the son of Vishrava and his wife Ilavida (or Ilivila or Devavarnini), daughter of the sage Bharadvaja or Trinabindu.

By this time, though still described as an asura, Kubera is offered prayers at the end of all ritual sacrifices. His titles, such as "best of kings" and "Lord of kings" (TheHarivamsa indicates that Kubera is made "Lord of kings"), in contrast to the god-king of heaven, Indra, whose title of "best of gods" led to the later belief that Kubera was a man. The early texts Gautama Dharmashastra and Apastamba describe him as a man. Only the Grihyasutras of Shankhayana and Hiranyakesin call him a god, and suggest offerings of meat, sesame seeds and flowers to him.

=== Puranic and epic descriptions ===
The Puranas and the epics Mahabharata and Ramayana grant Kubera unquestioned godhood. Kubera also acquired the status of the "Lord of riches" and the wealthiest Deva. He also becomes a lokapala ("world protector") and guardian (dikapala) of the North direction, although he is also sometimes associated with the East. Kubera's status as a lokapala and a dikpala is assured in the Ramayana, but in the Mahabharata, some lists do not include Kubera. Thus, Kubera is considered a later addition to the original list of Loka-palas, where the gods Agni or Soma appear in his place. This status, the Ramayana records, was granted to Kubera by Brahma—the creator-god and father of Pulastya—as a reward for his severe penance. Brahma also conferred upon Kubera the riches of the world (Nidhis), "equality with gods", and the Pushpaka Vimana, a flying chariot. Kubera then ruled in the golden city of Lanka, identified with modern-day Sri Lanka. The Mahabharata says that Brahma conferred upon Kubera the lordship of wealth, friendship with Shiva, godhood, status as a world-protector, a son called Nalakubera/Nalakubara, the Pushpaka Vimana and the lordship of the Nairrata demons.

Both the Puranas and the Ramayana feature the half-blood siblings of Kubera. Vishrava, Kubera's father, also married the rakshasa (demigod) princess Kaikesi, who mothered four rakshasa children: Ravana, the chief antagonist of the Ramayana, and his siblings, Kumbhakarna, Vibhishana, and Shurpanaka. The Mahabharata regards Vishrava as the brother of Kubera, so Kubera is described as the uncle of Ravana and his siblings. It records that when Kubera approached Brahma for the favour of superseding his father Pulastya, Pulastya created Vishrava. To seek the favour of Vishrava, Kubera sent three women to him, by whom Vishrava begot his demon children. Ravana, after acquiring a boon of Brahma, drove Kubera away from Lanka and seized his Pushpaka Vimana, which was returned to Kubera after Ravana's death. Kubera then settled on Gandhamandana mountain, near Mount Kailash – the abode of the god Shiva—in the Himalayas. Sometimes, Kailash itself is called Kubera's residence. His city is usually called Alaka or Alaka-puri ("curl-city"), but also Prabha ("splendour"), Vasudhara ("bejeweled") and Vasusthali ("abode of treasures"). There, Kubera had a grove called Caitraratha, where the leaves were jewels and the fruits were girls of heaven. There is also a charming lake called Nalini in the grove. Kubera is often described as a friend of Shiva in the epics. The Padma Purana says that Kubera prayed to Shiva for many years, and Shiva granted him the kingship of yakshas.

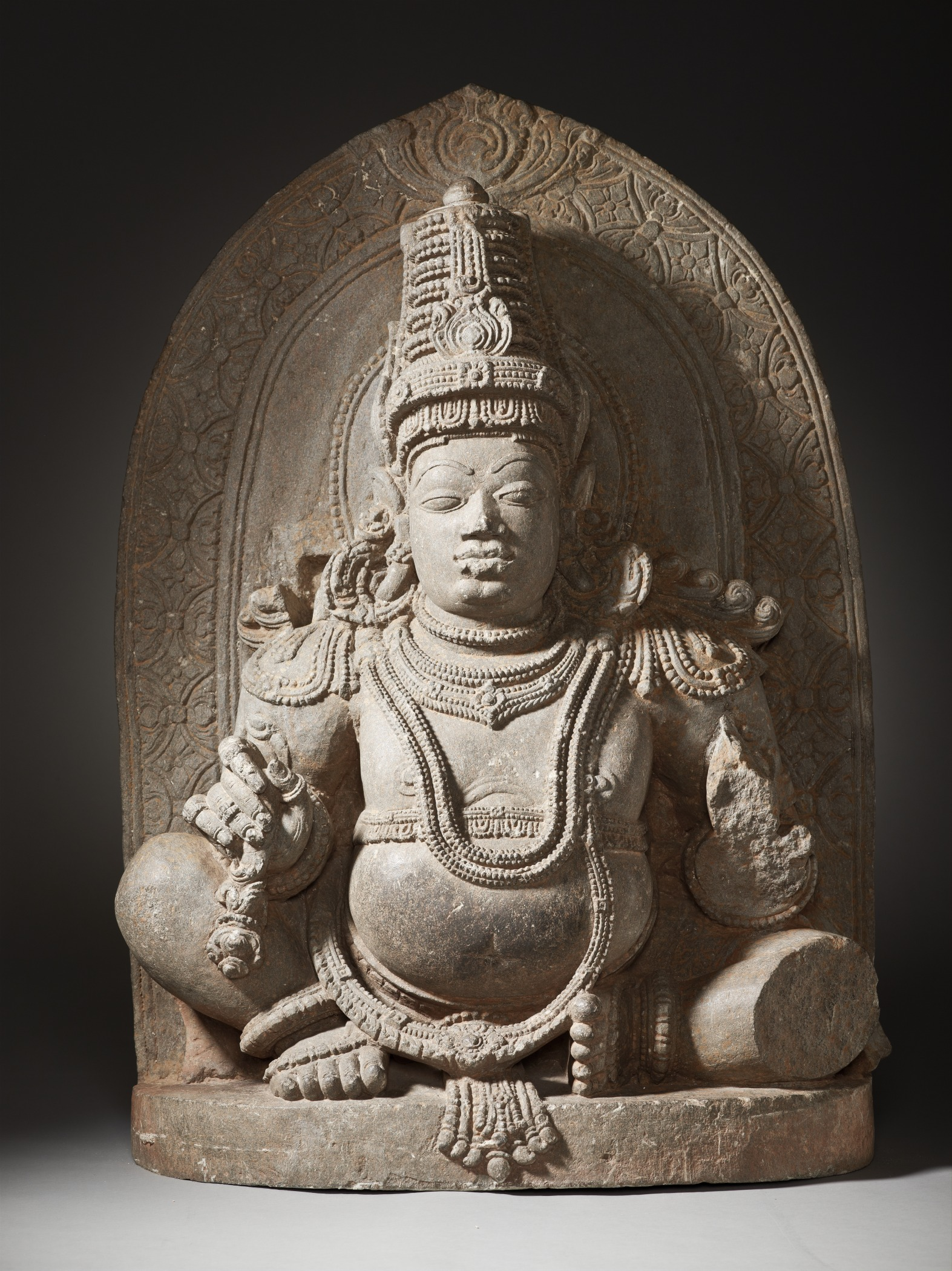
An 11th century Kubera, Karnataka.

A description of Kubera's magnificent court appears in the Mahabharata as well as the Meghaduta. Here, gandharvas and apsaras entertain Kubera. Shiva and his wife Parvati often frequent Kubera's court, which is attended by semi-divine beings like the vidyadharas; kimpurushas; rakshasas; pishachas; as well as Padma and Shankha; personified treasures (nidhi); and Manibhadra, Kubera's chief attendant and chief of his army. Like every world-protector, Kubera has seven seers of the North in residence. Alaka is recorded to be plundered by Ravana once, and attacked by the Pandava prince, Bhima once. Kubera's Nairrata army is described to have defeated king Mucukunda, who then defeated them by the advice of his guru Vashishta. Shukra, the preceptor of the asuras, is also recorded to have defeated Kubera and stolen his wealth. Another major tale in the scriptures records how Kubera entertained the sage Ashtavakra in his palace.

Kubera is the treasurer of the gods, and the overlord of the semi-divine yakshas, the guhyakas, kinnaras and gandharvas, who act as his assistants and protectors of the jewels of the earth, as well as guardians of his city. Kubera is also the guardian of travelers and the giver of wealth to individuals, who please him. The rakshasas also serve Kubera, however, some cannibalistic rakshasas are described to have sided with Ravana in the battle against Kubera. Kubera also developed as minor marriage-divinity. He is invoked with Shiva at weddings and is described as Kameshvara ("Lord of Kama – pleasure, desire etc."). He is associated with fertility of the aquatic type.

The Puranas and the Mahabharata record that Kubera married Bhadra ("auspicious"), or Riddhi ("prosperity"), daughter of the demon Mura. She is also called Yakshi – a female yaksha, Kauberi ("wife of Kubera") and Charvi ("splendour"). They had three sons: Nalakubara ("Reed-axle"), Manigriva ("Bejewled-neck") or Varna-kavi ("Colourful poet"), and Mayuraja ("king of animals resembling men"); and a daughter called Minakshi ("fish-eyed").

== Worship ==
As the treasurer of the riches of the world, Kubera is prescribed to be worshipped. Kubera is also credited money to the deity Venkateshwara (a form of Vishnu) for his marriage with Padmavati. In remembrance of this, the reason devotees go to Tirupati to donate money in Venkateshwara's Hundi ("Donation pot"), is so that he can pay it back to Kubera. He is also associated with Lakshmi for this reason, and is sometimes represented with her as Kubera Lakshmi.

While Kubera still enjoys prayers as the god of wealth, his role is largely taken by the god of wisdom, fortune and obstacle-removal, Ganesha, with whom he is generally associated.

== Beyond Hinduism ==
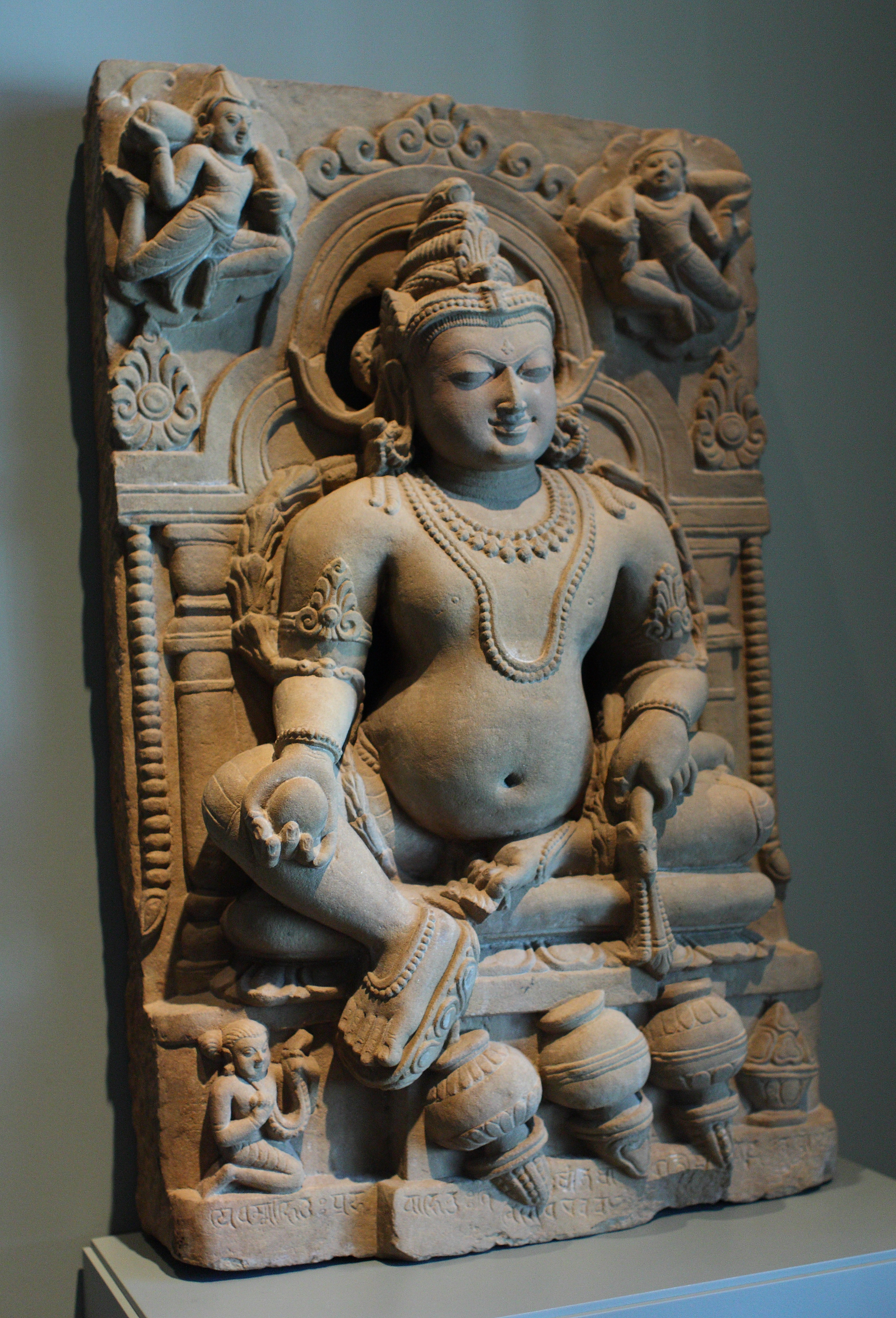
Jambhala, the Buddhist Kubera, depicted similar to Kubera

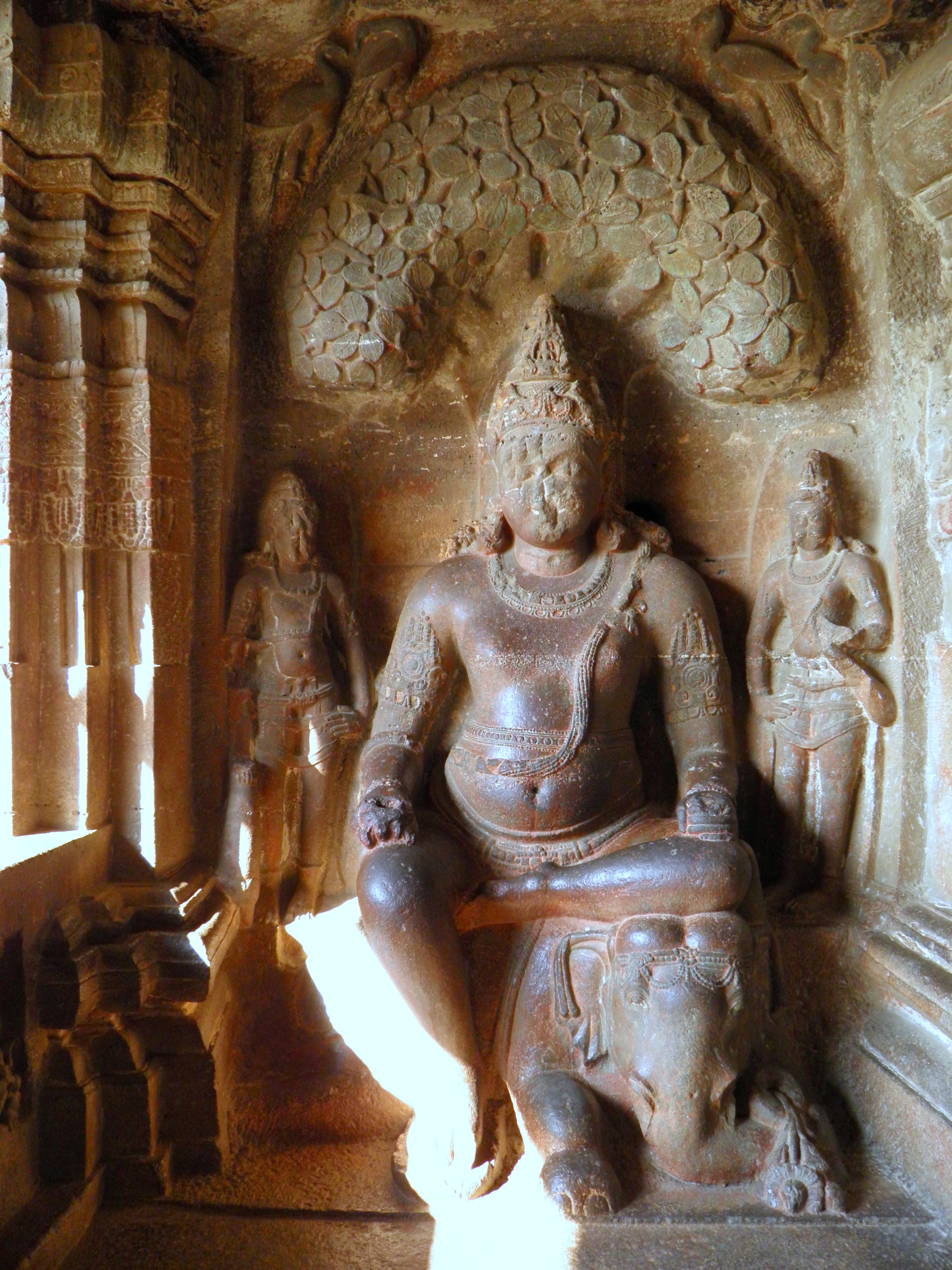
Kubera on an elephant in the Jain caves of Ellora.

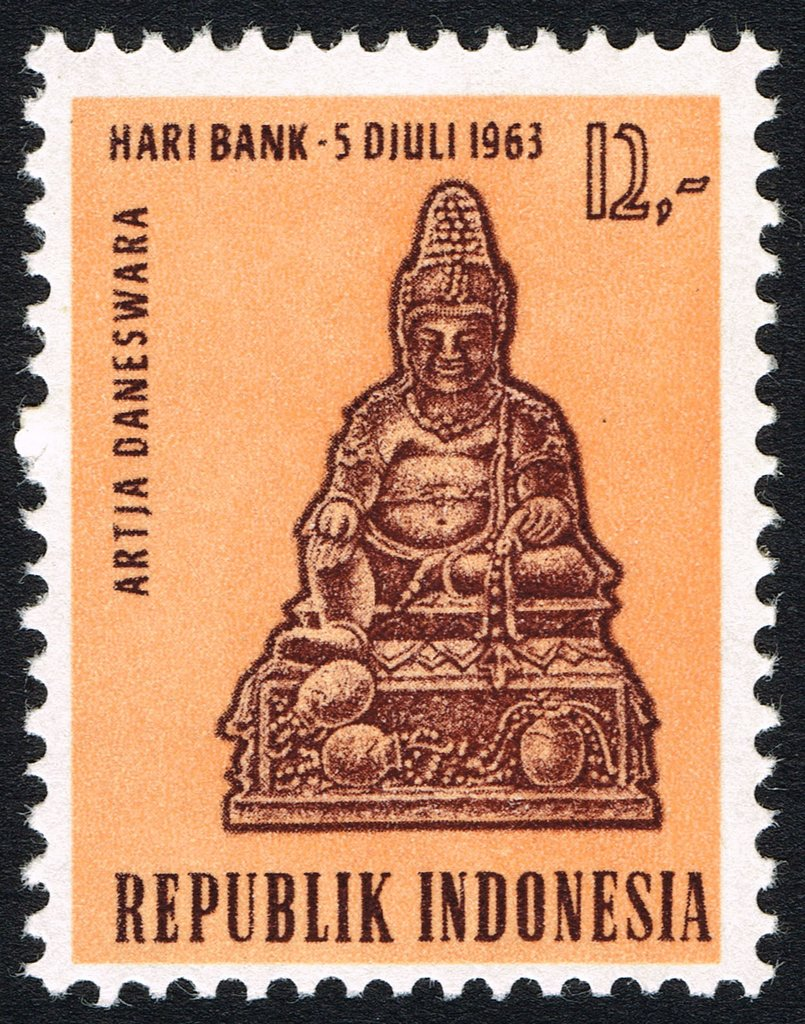
Indonesia often uses Hindu symbolism, such as Daneswara or Kuwera, to symbolise bank and wealth

Kubera is also recognized outside India and outside Hinduism. Kubera is a popular figure in Buddhist and Jain mythology. The orientalist Nagendra Kumar Singh remarked that, "Every Indian religion has a Kubera after the Hindu prototype."

=== Buddhism ===
Kubera is identified as the Buddhist Vaiśravaṇa (or Jambhala) and the Japanese Bishamon. The Buddhist Vaisravana, like the Hindu Kubera, is the regent of the North, a lokapala, and the Lord of yakshas. He is one of the Four Heavenly Kings, who are each associated with a cardinal direction. In Buddhist legends, Kubera is also equated with Pañcika, whose wife Hariti is a symbol of abundance. A. Getty comments that the iconography of Kubera and Pancika is so similar that in certain cases it is extremely difficult to distinguish between them. The Japanese Bishamon, also known as Tamon-Ten, is one of the Jūni-ten (十二天), a group of twelve Hindu deities adopted in Buddhism as guardian deities (deva or ten) who are found in or around Buddhist shrines. The Juni-Ten group of twelve deities were created by adding four deities to the older grouping of Happou-Ten, the eight guardians of the directions. Bishamon rules over the north, like his Hindu counterpart Kubera.

=== Jainism ===
In Jainism, Kubera is the attendant yaksha of the 19th Tirthankar Mallinath. He is usually called Sarvanubhuti or Sarvahna, and may be depicted with four faces, rainbow colours and eight arms. The Digambara sect of Jainism gives him six weapons and three heads, while the Śvetāmbaras portray him with four to six arms and numerous choices of weapons. However, his attributes such as the money bag and citron fruit are consistent. He may ride a man or an elephant. He is related to the Buddhist Jambhala rather than the Hindu Kubera.

== Bibliography ==
- Hopkins, Edward Washburn (1915). Epic mythology. Strassburg K.J. Trübner. ISBN 0-8426-0560-6.
- Sutherland, Gail Hinich (1991). The disguises of the demon: the development of the Yakṣa in Hinduism and Buddhism. SUNY Press. ISBN 0-7914-0622-9.
