= Twelve Devas =

12 Japanese Buddhist gods, associated with directions

Twelve Devas
(14th-/15th-century hanging scrolls)

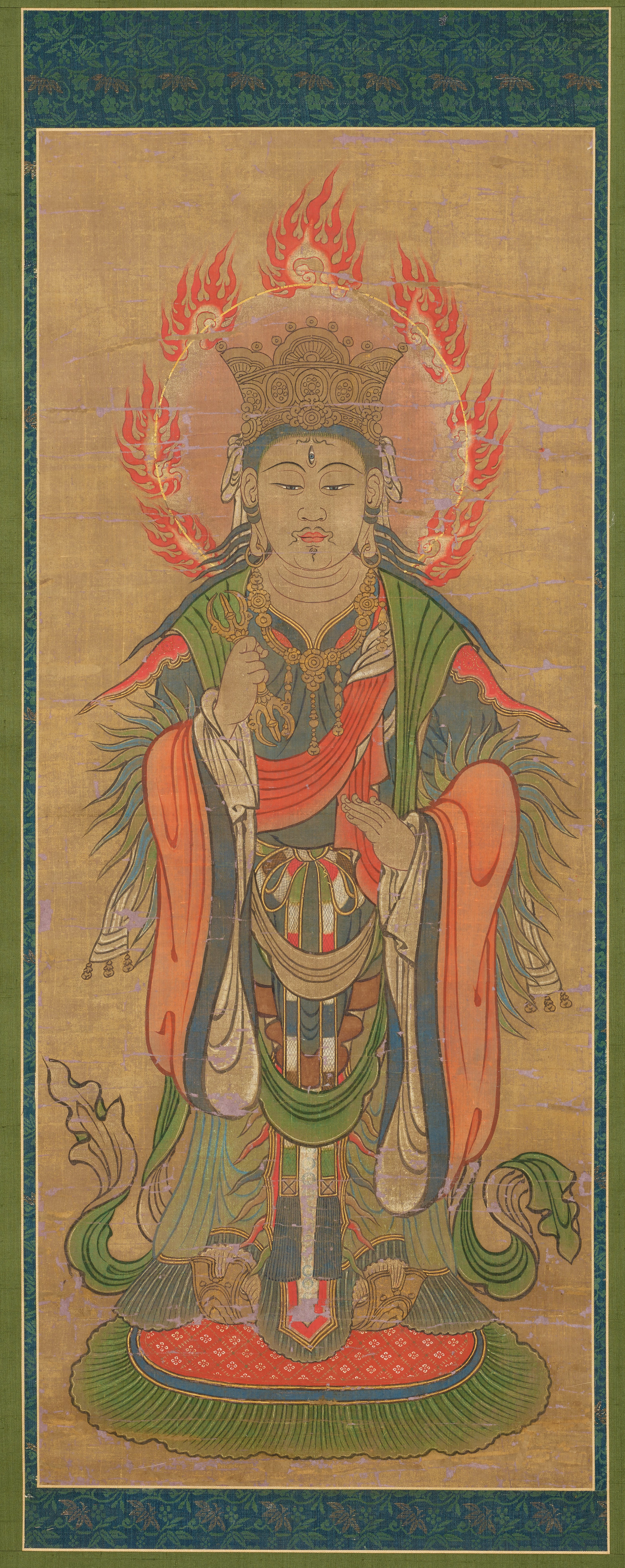
Taishakuten

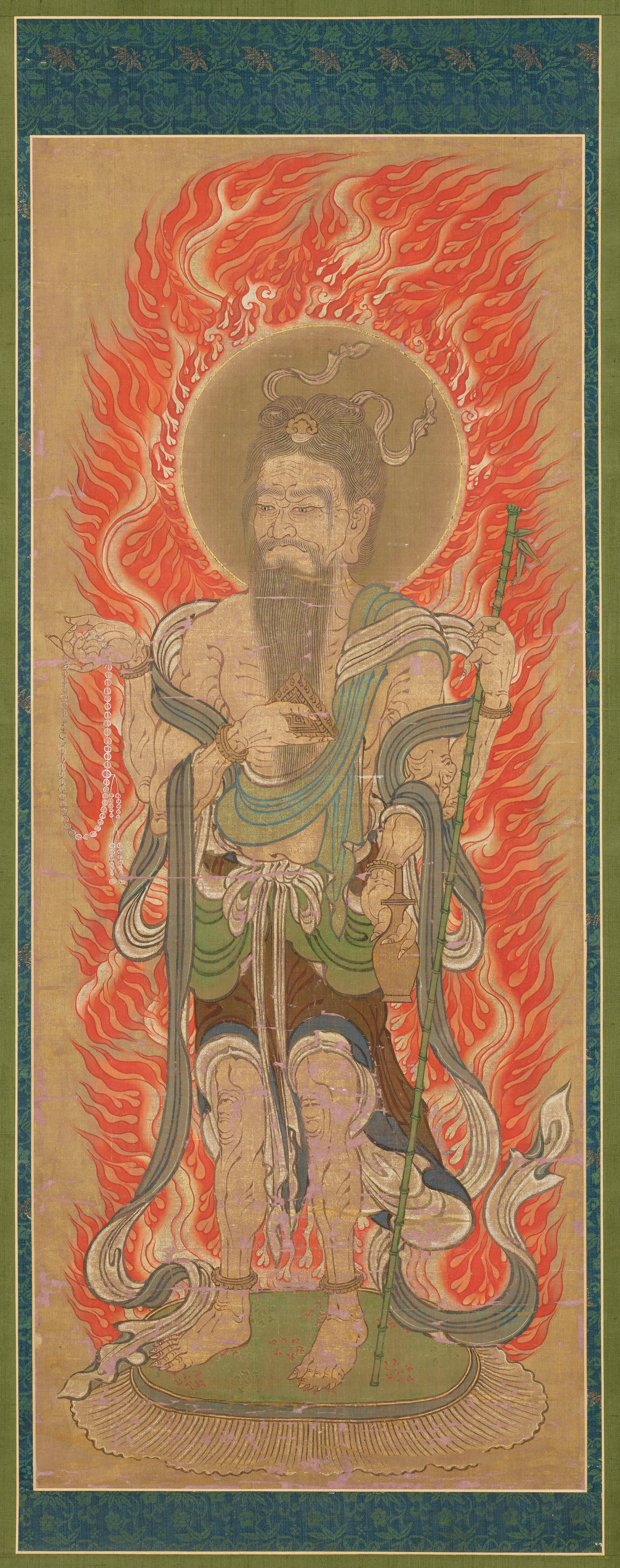
Katen

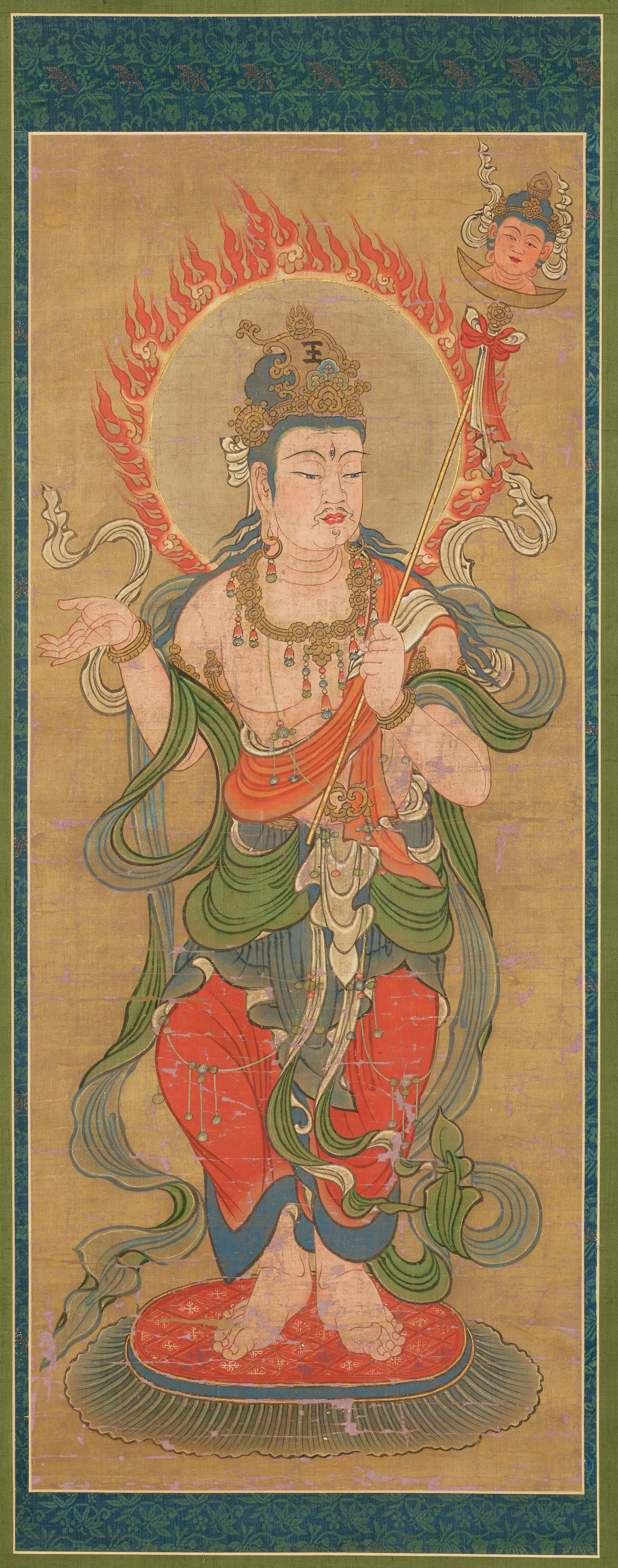
Enmaten

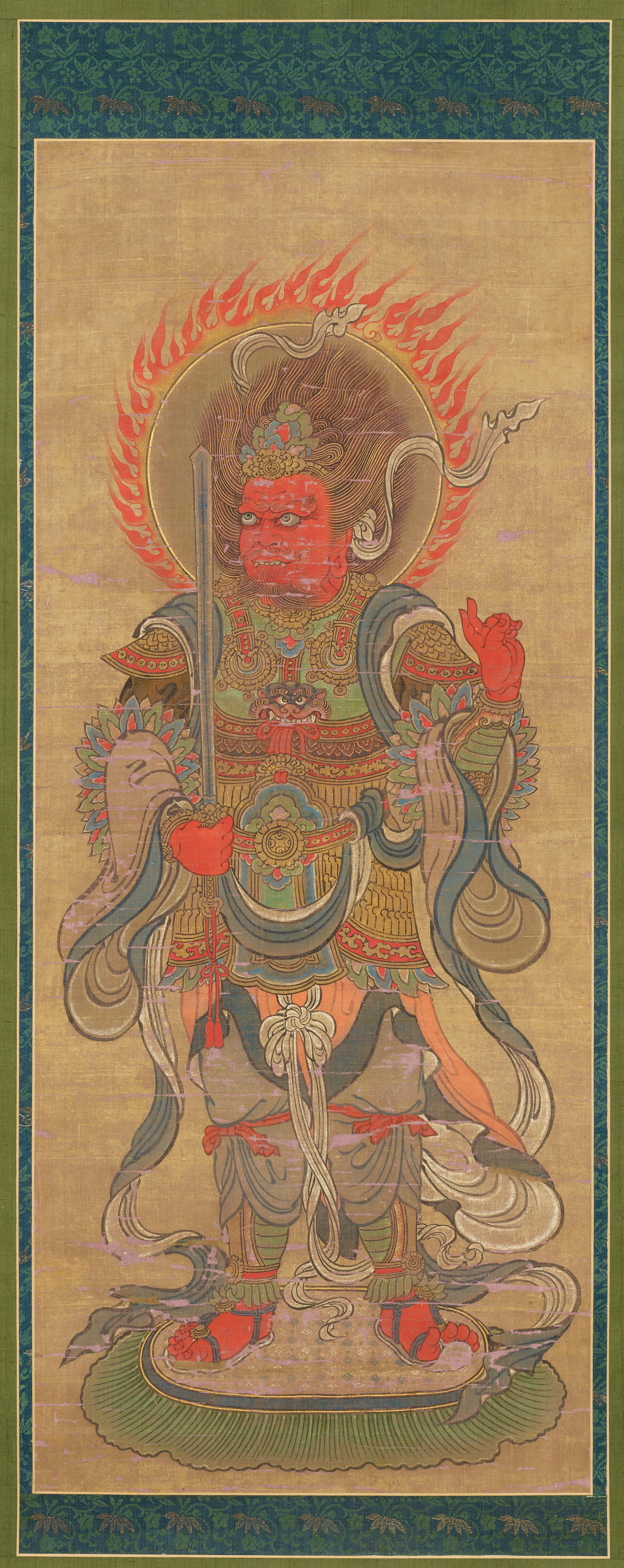
Rasetsuten

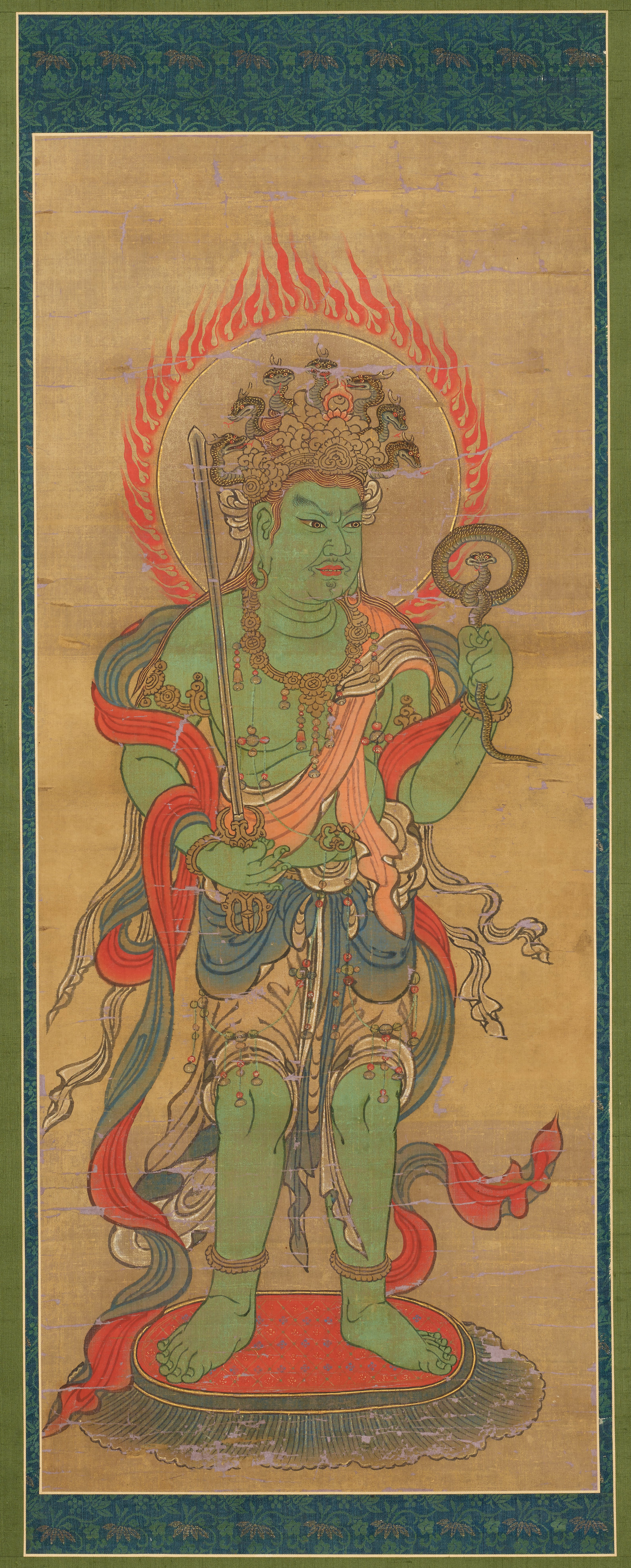
Suiten

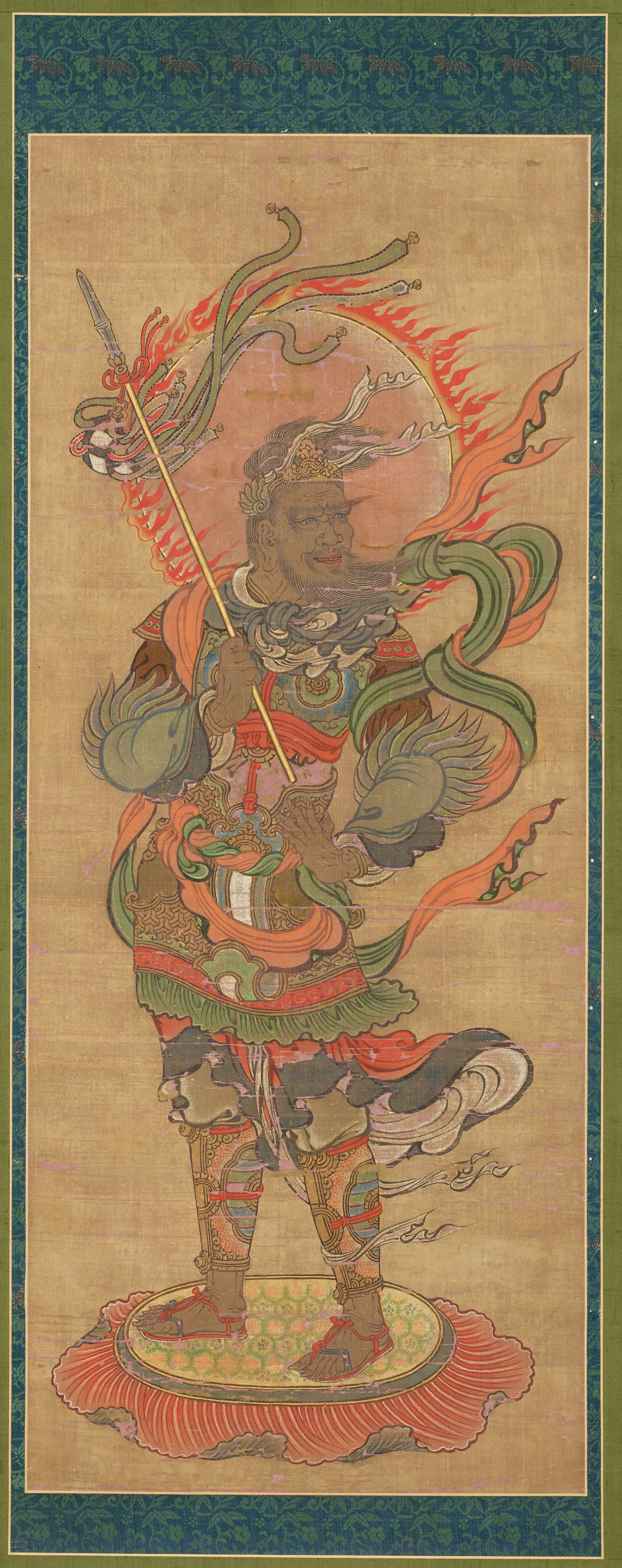
Futen

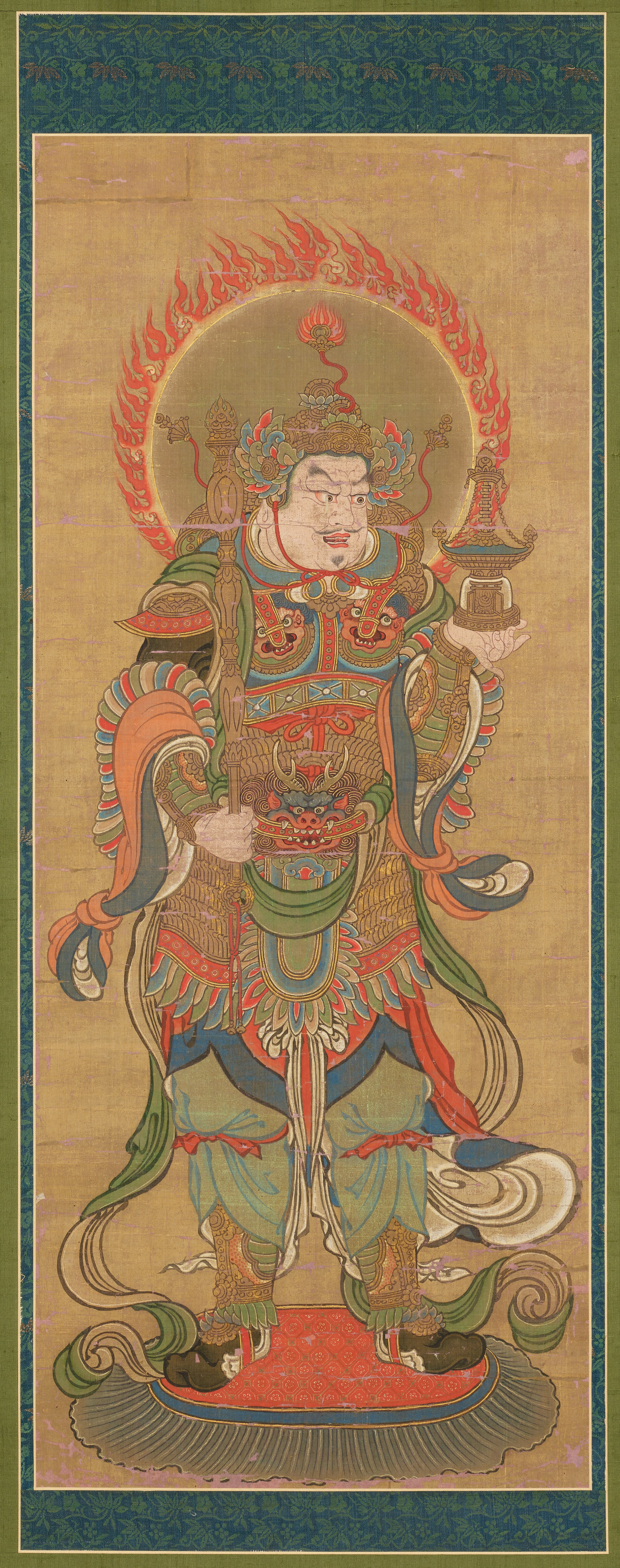
Bishamonten

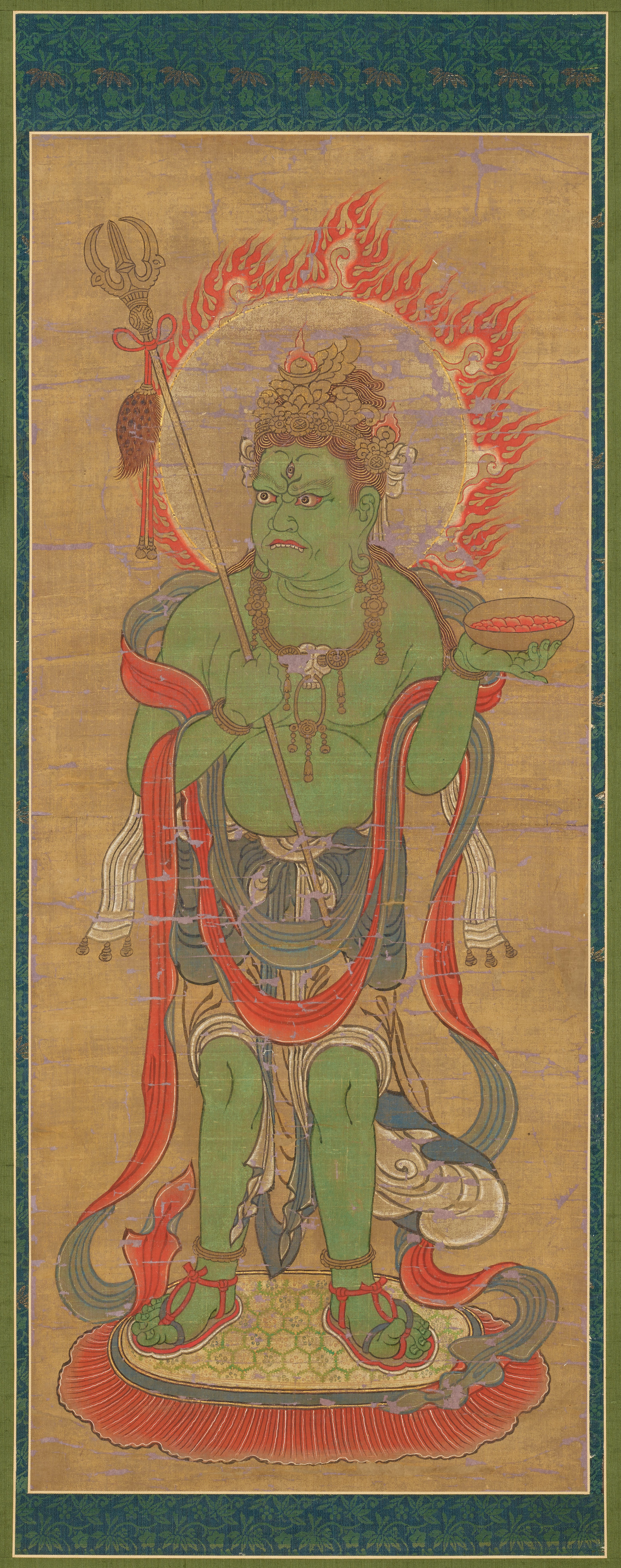
Ishanaten

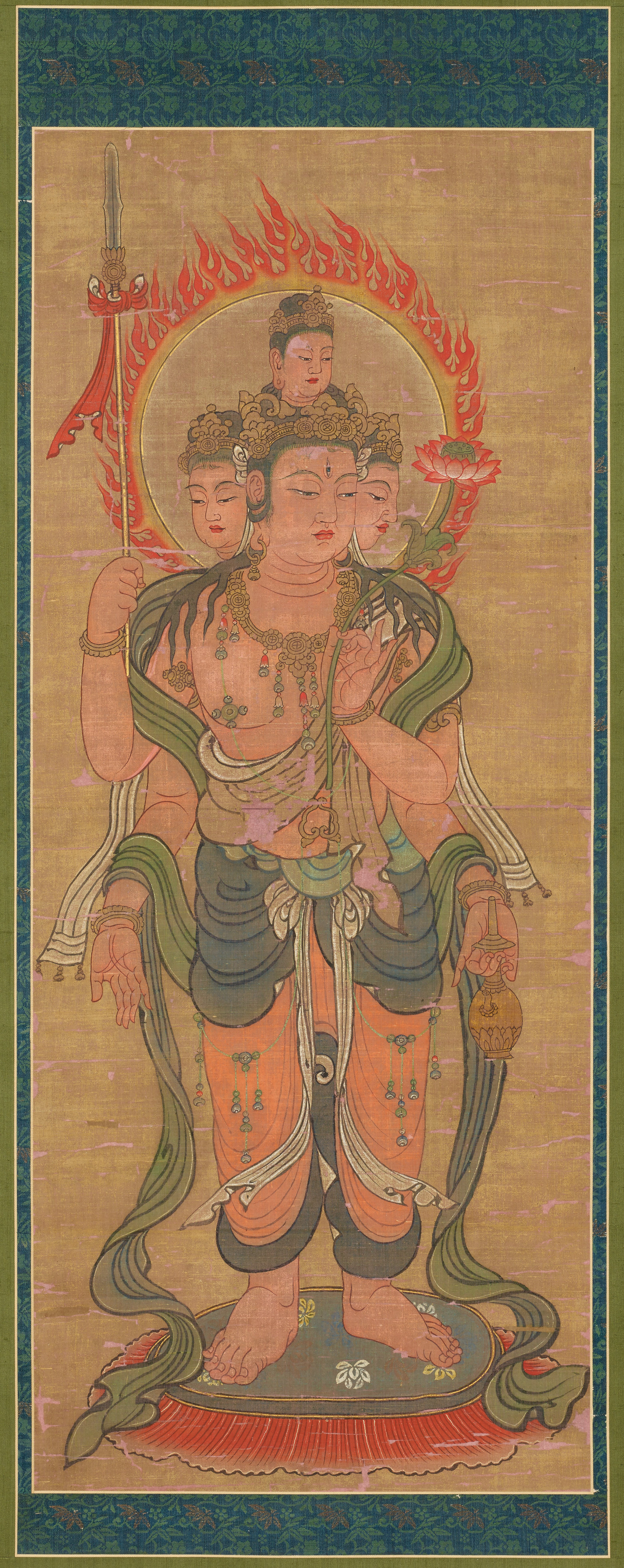
Bonten

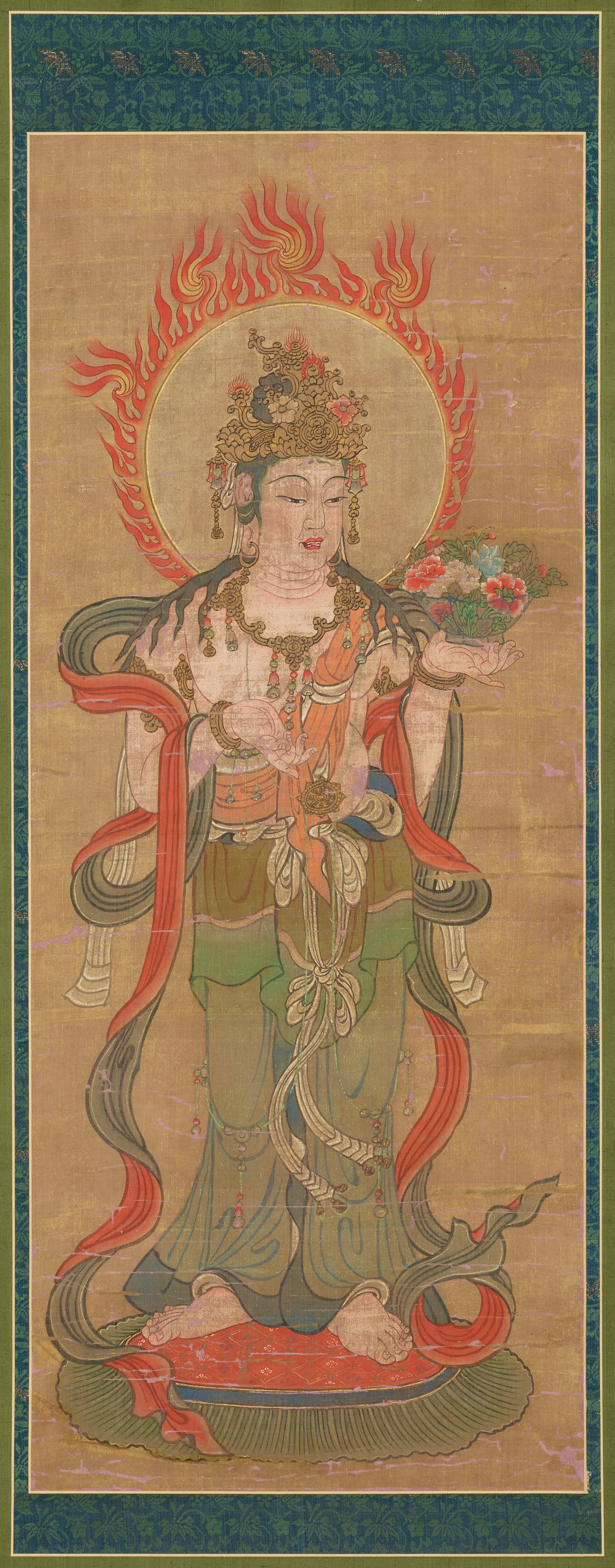
Jiten

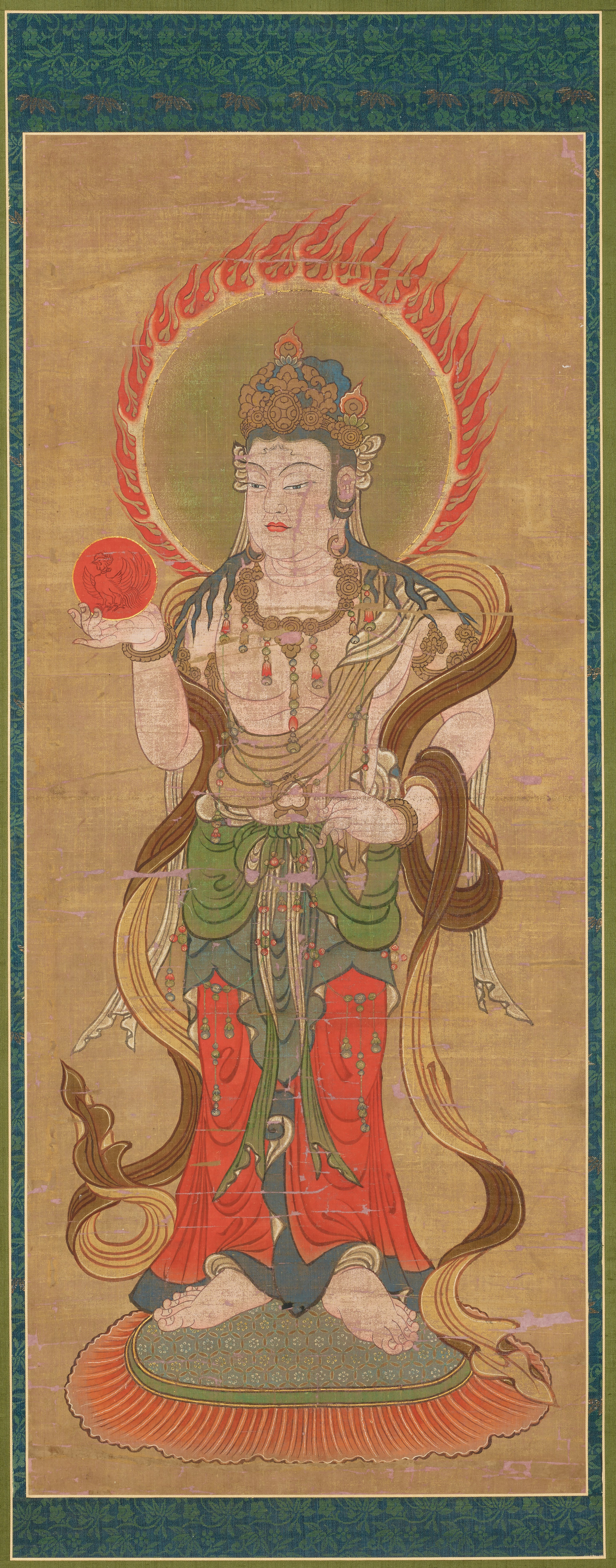
Nitten

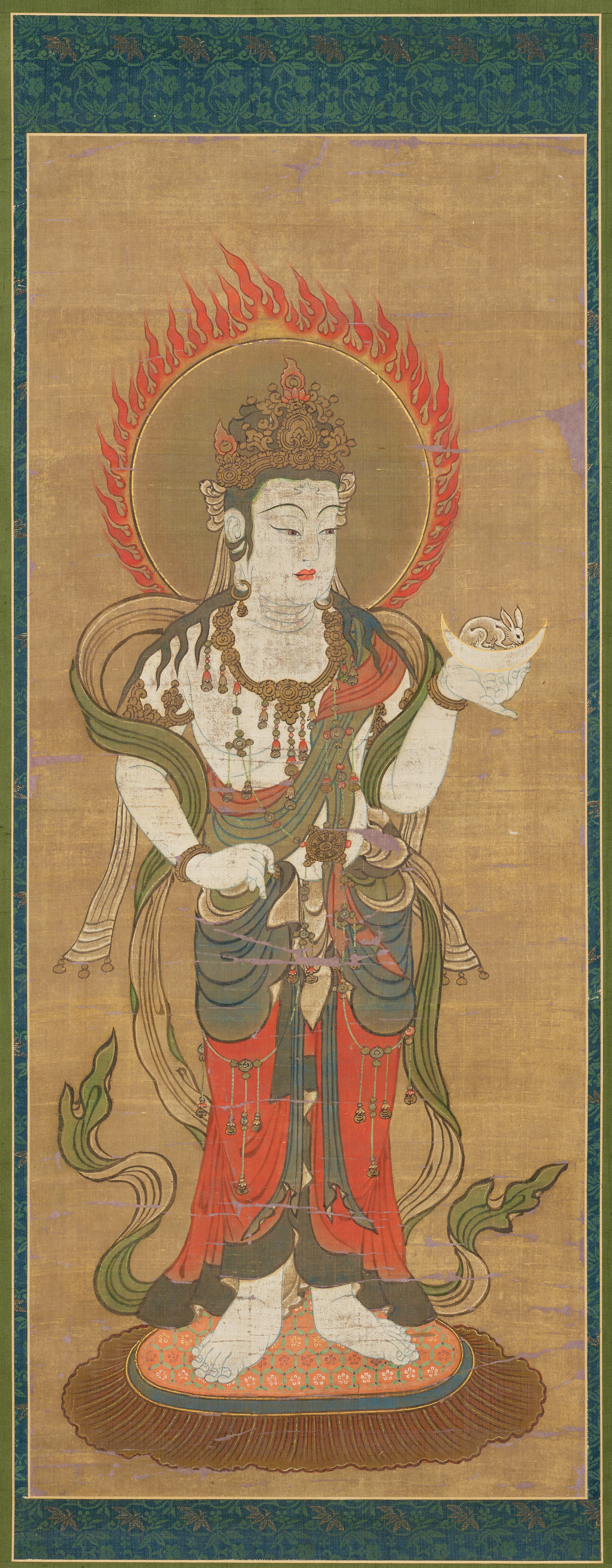
Gatten

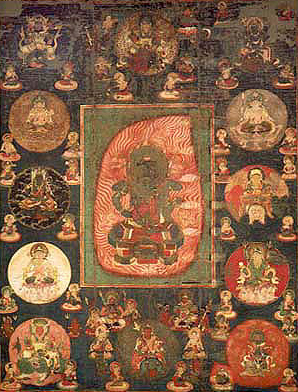
Twelve Deva Mandala, Kokubunji, Shimonoseki, Yamaguchi, Japan

The Twelve Devas or Juniten (Japanese: 十二天, Jūniten or Japanese: 十二大天衆, Jūnidaitenju) are twelve Japanese Buddhist guardian deities (devas or ten), associated with directions and celestial bodies. They are essentially Hindu gods, incorporated in Japanese Esoteric Buddhism (Mikkyō).

Initially, the group consisted of eight deities called Happoten or Happouten (Japanese: 八方天), associated with the four cardinal and four semi-cardinal directions. Later, the deities of Heaven (Zenith) and Earth (Nadir) were added, making the group of ten – Jitten (Japanese: 十天). Finally, the Sun and the Moon deities joined the group to form the Twelve Devas.

The Twelve Devas are depicted together in a group, generally in paintings on folding screens which are used in esoteric rituals.

== List ==
The Twelve Devas are:

No	Rōmaji Name	Japanese	Sanskrit Name	Hindu equivalent	Seed ([Bīja])	Direction/Association
1	Jikokuten	持國天	Dhṛtarāṣṭra	提頭賴吒		East
2	Taishakuten	帝釈天	Indra/Śakra	Indra		East
3	Katen	火天	Agni	Agni		Southeast, Fire
4	Zōjōten	増長天	Virūḍhaka	Virūḍhaka		South
5	Enmaten	焔魔天	Yama	Yama		South
6	Rasetsuten	羅刹天	Rākṣasa/Nirṛti	Rakshasa/Nirrti		Southwest
7	Kōmokuten	廣目天	Virūpākṣa	Virūpākṣa		West
8	Suiten	水天	Varuṇa	Varuna		West, Water
9	Fuuten	風天	Vāyu	Vayu		Northwest, Wind
10	Bishamonten	毘沙門天	Vaiśravaṇa	Kubera(Vaisravana)		North
11	Ishanaten(Izanaten)	伊舎那天	Iśana	Ishana/Shiva		Northeast
12	Bonten	梵天	Brahma(n)	Brahma		Zenith/Heaven
13	Jiten	地天	Pṛthivī	Prithvi		Nadir/Earth
14	Nitten	日天	Sūrya/Āditya	Surya		Sun
15	Gatten	月天	Candra	Chandra		Moon

== History and functions ==
The Twelve Devas functioned as guardians of Esoteric Buddhist monasteries. They are generally represented as a group in paintings. The earliest known Japanese paintings of the Twelve Devas are found in Saidaiji Temple, Nara (early Heian period). Another set is found in Toji Temple in Kyoto, where they were used for esoteric rituals like the Latter Seven Days Ritual (Goshichinichi no Mishiho) for the New Year. During the late Heian period (794–1185), a procession of beings, wearing the masks of the Twelve Devas (juuniten men, 十二天面) was part of esoteric initiation rites. Later from the 12th century, the same was replaced by paintings of the deities, standing in pairs on six-panelled folding screens called juuniten byoubu (十二天屏風) during the initiation rituals (abhiṣeka).

The Twelve Devas also appear in the mandalas - Taizoukai mandara, juuniten mandara and Anchin mandara.

== Iconography ==
Early images of the Twelve Devas depict them seated on animals (choujuuza; e.g., Saidaji) or seated on felt pedestals and with two attendants (e.g., Toji, now in Kyoto National Museum). Later paintings on folding screens usually depict them standing, sometimes on lotus pedestals.

Taishakuten (the king of gods - Indra) and Bonten (the creator god Brahma) are two major Hindu deities who are often depicted as the protector of the Buddha, after assimilation in Buddhism. In Buddhism, Taishakuten is the king of the gods and ruler of the Trāyastriṃśa Heaven. Both deities are depicted dressed as Bodhisattvas. Both are depicted in life-events of the Buddha, on his either side, almost indistinguishable from each other.

In other depictions, Taishakuten is depicted as martial figure with a thunderbolt (vajra) in his right hand and left hand on his hip. He may be seated on an elephant.

Bonten may be depicted with one or four heads. He has a third eye and four arms, holding a fly whisk, a lotus, a staff and hand with palm out. He may be seated on a pedestal of four geese.

Katen (lit. "fire deva") is generally depicted as a serious-faced, aged hermit. His hair and beard are white. His complexion may be red. He is surrounded by a flaming aureole. He may have two or four arms. In his four arms, he generally holds a bamboo stick with some leaves or a staff, a fiery triangle, a rosary and a water vessel. He may ride a blue sheep.

The compassionate-faced Enmaten holds a staff with a head at the top; his other arm is bent with the palm outwards. He may ride a buffalo.

Rasetsuten or Nirichi is the king of the demonic rasetsu (Rakshasa). He may be seated on a lion. He wears an armour. He may be depicted with a fiery halo. In his right hand, he holds a sword and makes a "sword" mudra (hand gesture) with his left hand.

Suiten (lit "water deva") can be depicted as a fair water spirit, in vibrant garments. He may depicted dressed in armour. He may have a snake-noose in his right hand, while the other hand is held against his waist as a fist. He wears a crown of serpents. His complexion may be depicted as light blue. He may be seated on a tortoise.

Futen (lit. "wind deva") is depicted as an aged man. He holds the scepter of the wind.

Bishamonten (Tamonten) is clad in armour and holds a jewelled staff (sansageki) in his right hand and a jewelled pagoda (houtou, stupa) in the other hand.

Ishanaten holds a trident and a bowl, filled with blood.

Jiten (lit. "earth deva") or Kenrojin (“solid earth deity”) may hold a vase or flowers in a basket in his hand.

Nitten (lit. "sun deva") may be depicted similar to a bodhisattva. He may be seated on a cart pulled by three to seven white horses. He may hold a lotus or a sun disc with a three-legged rooster in it.

Gatten (lit. "moon deva") may be depicted similar to a bodhisattva. He may be seated on a white goose. He sometimes holds a crescent moon with a rabbit on it.
