= Lokapala =

Guardians or kings of the cardinal directions

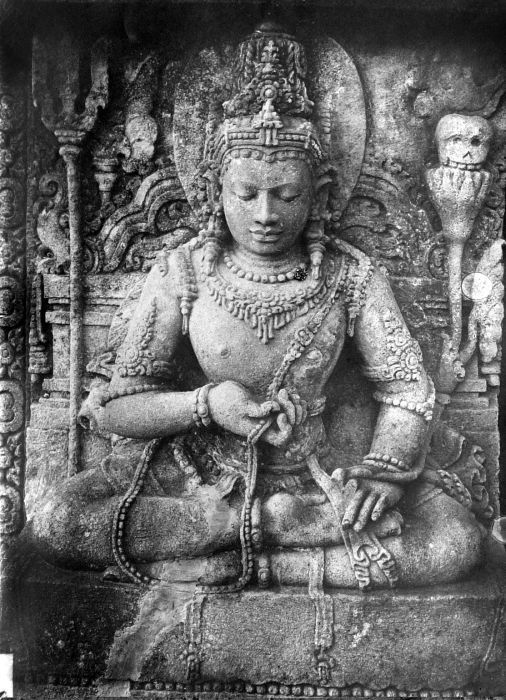
The 9th century Hindu Lokapala devata, the guardians of the directions, on the wall of Shiva temple, Prambanan, Java, Indonesia.

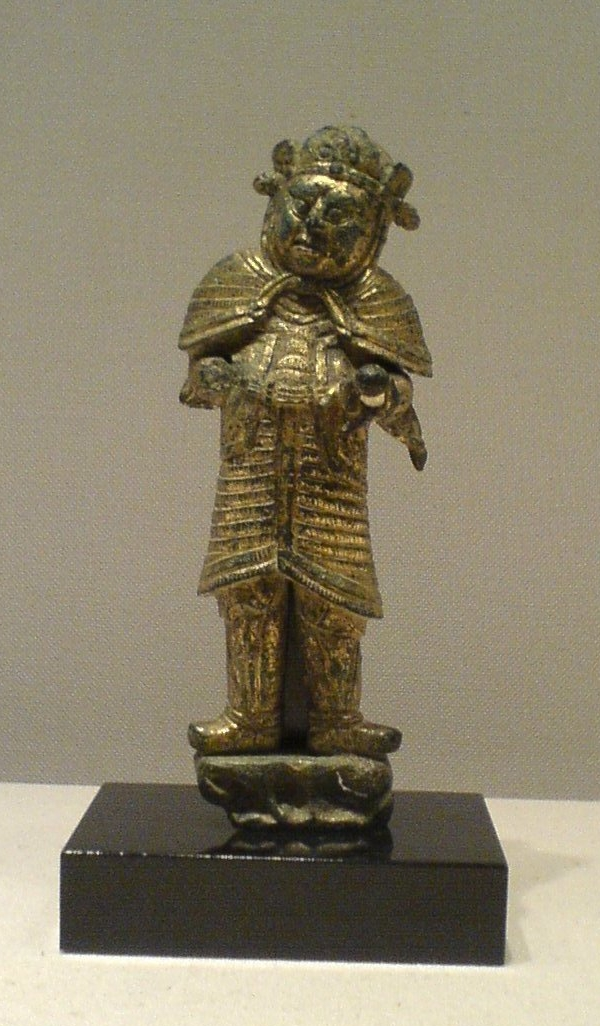
The Korean statuette of Lokapala

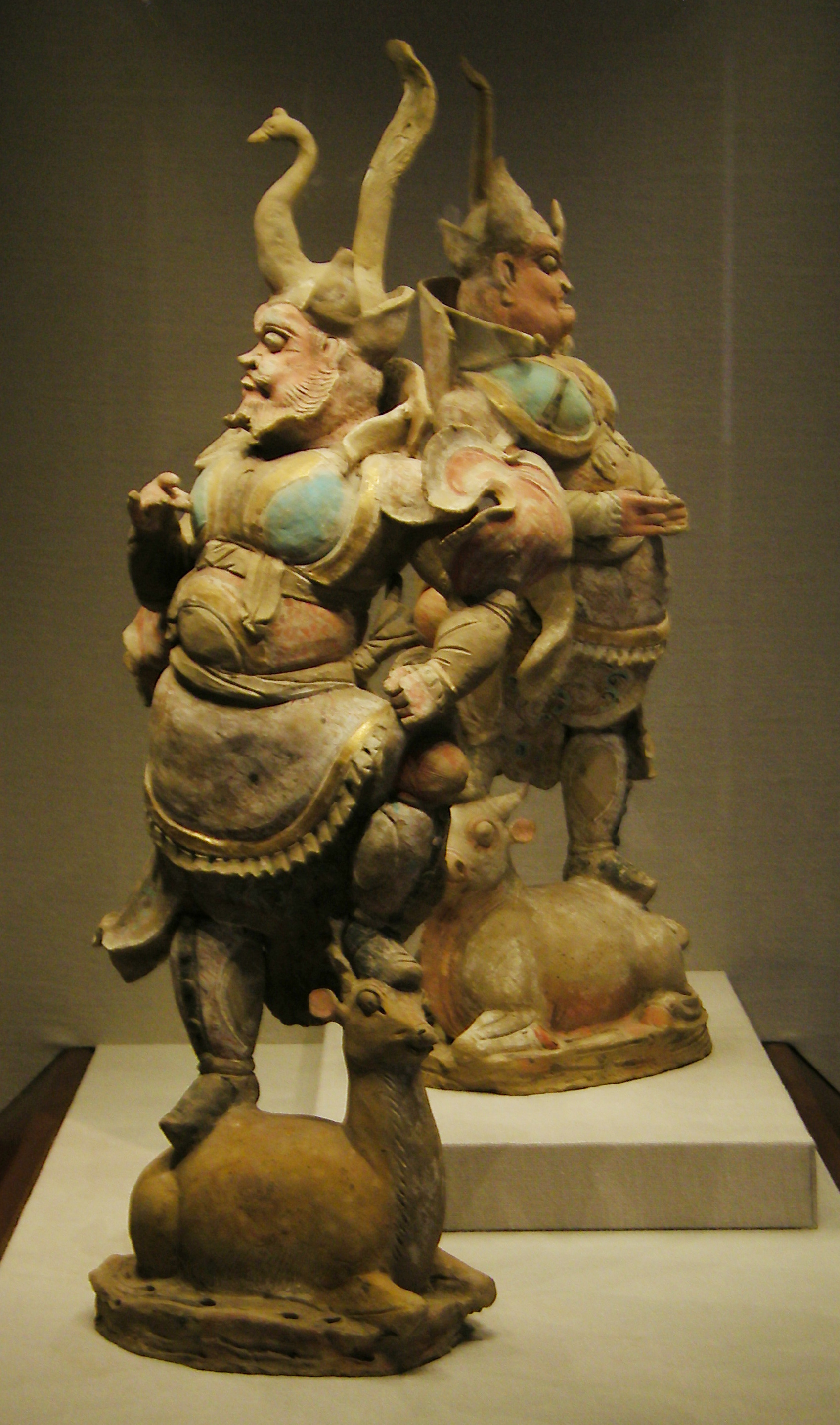
Statues of two Tang dynasty Lokapala

Lokapāla (Sanskrit: लोकपाल, Tibetan: འཇིག་རྟེན་སྐྱོང་བ, Wylie: 'jig rten skyong ba), Sanskrit, Pāli, and Tibetan for "guardian of the world", has different uses depending on whether it is found in a Hindu or Buddhist context. In Hinduism, lokapāla refers to the Guardians of the Directions associated with the eight, nine and ten cardinal directions. In Buddhism, lokapāla refers to the Four Heavenly Kings, and to other protector spirits, whereas the Guardians of the Directions are referred to as dikpāla.

== In Hinduism ==
In Hinduism, the guardians of the cardinal directions are called dikapāla. The four principal guardians are:

1. Kubera (North)
2. Yama (South)
3. Indra (East)
4. Varuṇa (West)

== In Buddhism ==
In Buddhism, lokapāla are one of two broad categories of dharmapāla (protectors of the Buddhist religion) -the other category being Wisdom Protectors. In China, "each is additionally associated with a specific direction and the Four Heraldic Animals of Chinese astronomy/astrology, as well as playing a more secular role in rural communities ensuring favorable weather for crops and peace throughout the land...Easily identified by their armor and boots, each has his own magic weapon and associations." Their names are Dhrtarastra (east), Virupaksa (west), Vaishravana (north), and Virudhaka (south).

In Tibetan Buddhism, many of these worldly protector deities are indigenous Tibetan deities, mountain gods, demons, spirits or ghosts that have been subjugated by Padmasambhava or other great adepts and oath bound to protect a monastery, geographic region, particular tradition or as guardians of Buddhism in general. These worldly protectors are invoked and propitiated to aid the monastery or Buddhist practitioner materially and to remove obstacles to practice. However, since they are considered to be Samsaric beings, they are not worshiped or considered as objects of refuge.

According to Tripitaka Master Shramana Hsuan Hua of the City of Ten Thousand Buddhas, all of these beings are invoked (hooked and summoned) and exhorted to behave (subdued) and protect the Dharma and its practitioners in the Shurangama Mantra.
