= Kumbhanda =

Spirits in Buddhist mythology

Translations of Kumbhāṇḍa
- Sanskrit: कुम्भाण्ड (IAST: Kumbhāṇḍa)
- Pali: कुम्भण्ड (Kumbhaṇḍa)
- Burmese: ကုမ္ဘဏ် (MLCTS: Kumbhaṇ /Kom Ban or Gome Ban/)
- Chinese: 鳩槃荼 or 鳩盤拏 (Pinyin: Jiūpántú or Jiūpánná)
- Japanese: 鳩槃荼 (Rōmaji: kubanda)
- Korean: 구반다 (RR: gubanda)
- Tagalog: Kumbhanda
- Tibetan: གྲུལ་བུམ་ Wylie: grul bum THL: drulbum
- Thai: กุมภัณฑ์
- Vietnamese: Cưu-bàn-đồ

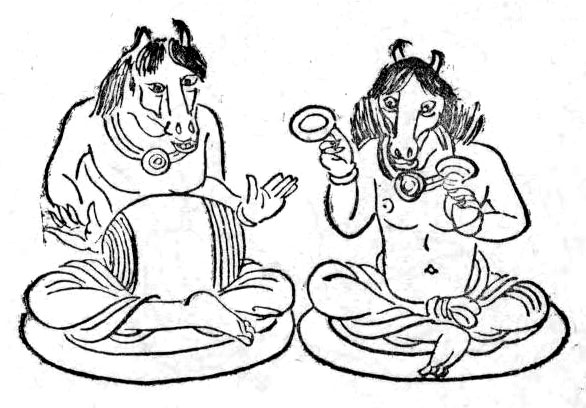
A male kumbhāṇḍa (left) and female Kumbhāṇḍakā (right).

A kumbhāṇḍa (Sanskrit) or kumbhaṇḍa (Pāli) is one of a group of dwarfish, misshapen spirits among the lesser deities of Buddhist mythology.

Kumbhāṇḍa was a dialectal form for "gourd", so they may get their name from being thought to resemble gourds in some way, e.g. in having big stomachs. But kumbhāṇḍa can also be interpreted as "pot-egg"; since "egg" (aṇḍa) was a common euphemism for "testicle", the kumbhāṇḍas were imagined having testicles "as big as pots".

The terms kumbhāṇḍa and yakṣa are sometimes used for the same creature; yakṣa in these cases is the more general term, including a variety of lower deities.

The kumbhāṇḍas are classed among the Cāturmahārājika deities, and are subject to the Great King Virūḍhaka, Guardian of the South. One of their chiefs is called Kumbhīra.

According to the Dà zhìdù lùn, greedy officers are reborn as kumbhāṇḍhas.

== See also ==
- Goblin
- Preta
- Salamanders in folklore
