= Four Heavenly Kings =

Buddhist gods

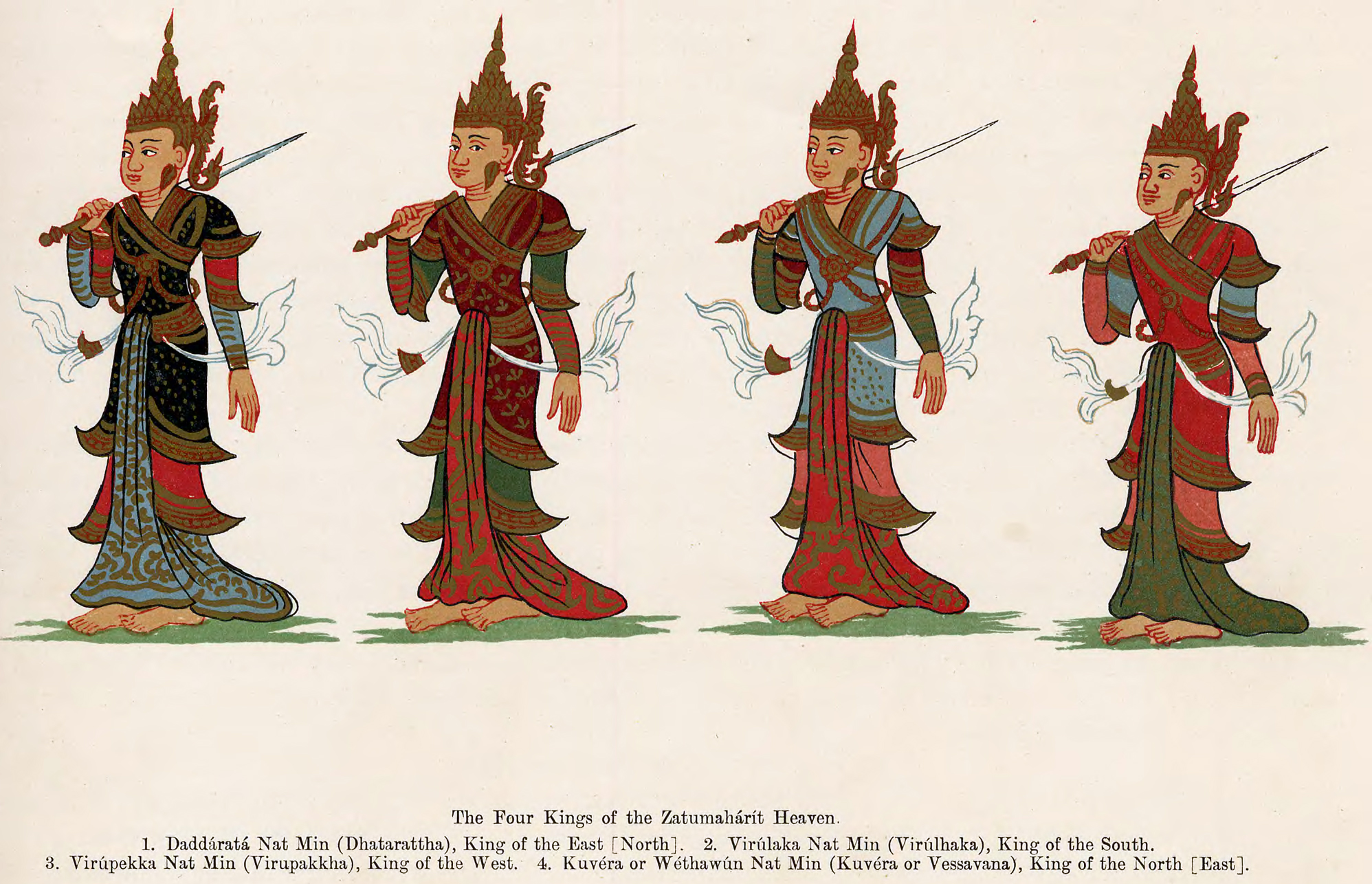
- The Four Guardian Kings in Burmese depiction.
- Sanskrit: चतुर्महाराज (Caturmahārāja)
- Pāli: चतु महाराज (Catu-Mahārāja)
- Chinese: 四大天王 (Sì Dà Tiānwáng)
- Japanese: 四天王 (Shitennō)

The Four Heavenly Kings are four Buddhist gods or devas, each of whom is believed to watch over one cardinal direction of the world. The Hall of Four Heavenly Kings is a standard component of Chinese Buddhist temples.

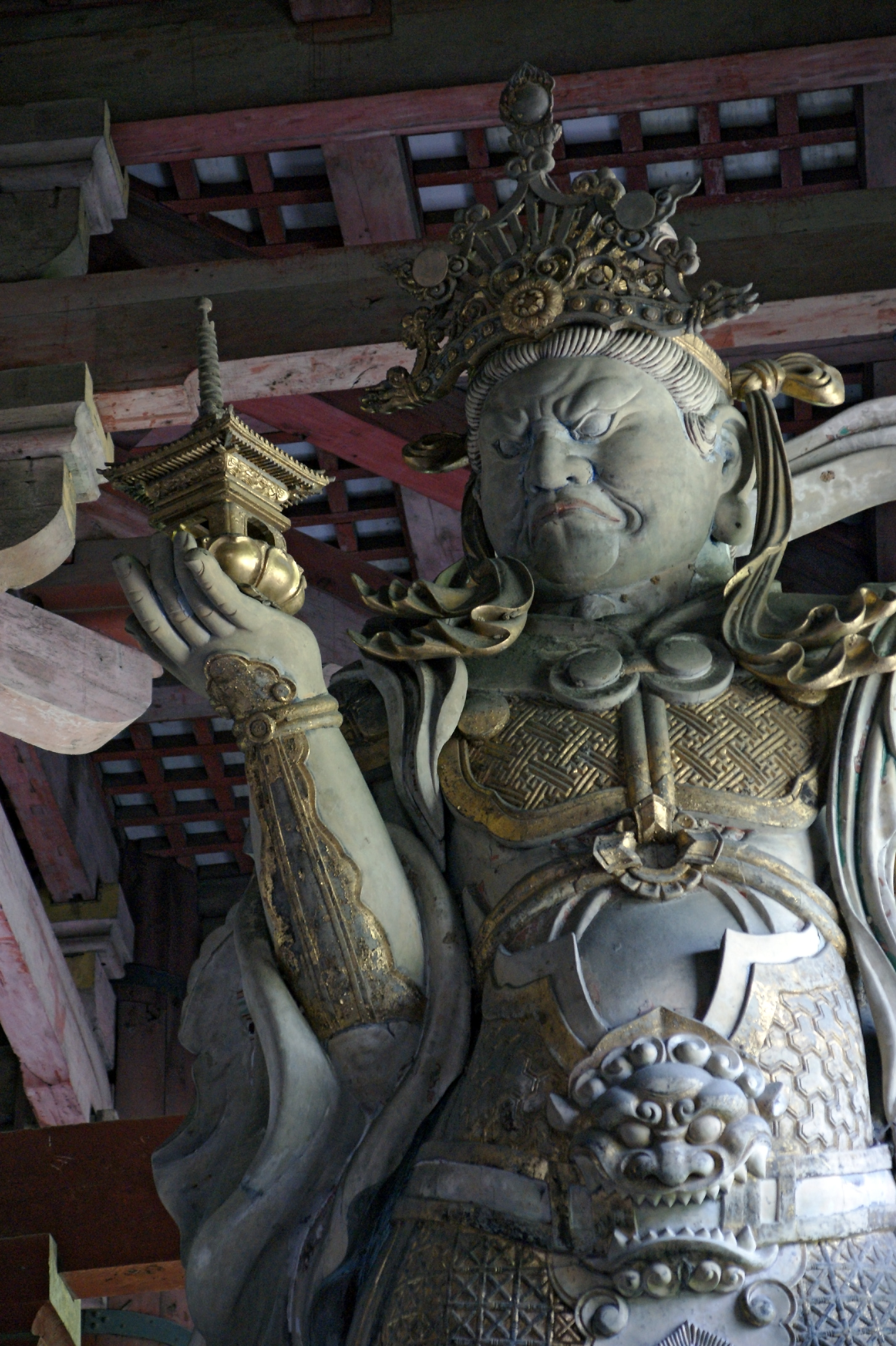
Tamon-ten (Vaiśravaṇa) at Tōdai-ji, Japan

== Individual kings and attributes ==
Each king corresponds to a cardinal direction and leads classes of lesser spirits or beings. Their names and roles vary slightly across Buddhist traditions.

Direction	Name (Sanskrit)	East Asian name	Domain / function
East	Dhṛtarāṣṭra	持國天王 (Chíguó Tiānwáng), 持国天 (Jikokuten)	Guardian of the East; leader of gandharvas and piśācas
South	Virūḍhaka	增長天王 (Zēngzhǎng Tiānwáng), 増長天 (Zōjōten)	Guardian of the South; leads kumbhāṇḍas and pretas
West	Virūpākṣa	廣目天王 (Guǎngmù Tiānwáng), 広目天 (Kōmokuten)	Guardian of the West; leads nāgas and pūtanas
North	Vaiśravaṇa	多聞天王 (Duōwén Tiānwáng), 多聞天/毘沙門天 (Tamonten/Bishamonten)	Guardian of the North; leader of yakṣas and rākṣasas; associated with wealth and protection
East South	Agni	火天（Huǒ Tiān/Katen）	Guardian of the Southeast; leader of gandharvas and piśācas
West South	Yama	焰(閻)摩天 (Yànmó Tiān/Yamaten)	Guardian of the Southwest; leader of nāgas and rākṣasas; leads kumbhāṇḍas and pretas
West North	Vayu	風天 (Fēng Tiān/Fūten)	Guardian of the Northwest; leads nāgas and pūtanas; associated with wealth and protection
East North	Shiva in Buddhism	伊舍那天 (Yīshènà Tiān/Ishanaten)	Guardian of the Northeast; leader of Shiva in Buddhism

== Names ==
The Kings are collectively named as follows:

Language	Written form	Romanization	Translation
Sanskrit	चतुर्महाराज	Chaturmahārāja; Chaturmahārājikā	Four Great Kings
Sanskrit	लोकपाल	Lokapāla	Guardians of the World
Sinhala	සතරවරම් දෙවිවරු	Satharawaram Dewiwaru	Four Privileged/Bestowed Gods
Burmese	စတုလောကပါလ စတုမဟာရာဇ်နတ်	IPA: [sətṵ lɔ́ka̰ pàla̰] IPA: [sətṵ məhà ɹɪʔ naʔ]	Loanword from catulokapāla loanword from catumahā + king nats
Chinese	天王	Tiānwáng	Heavenly Kings
Chinese	四天王	Sìtiānwáng	Four Heavenly Kings
Chinese	四大天王	Sìdà Tiānwáng	Four Great Heavenly Kings
Chinese	风调雨顺/風調雨順	Fēng Tiáo Yǔ Shùn	Good, rainy weather for growing crops
Japanese	四天王	Shi Tennō	Four Heavenly Kings
Japanese	四大天王	Shidai Tennō	Four Great Heavenly Kings
Korean	四天王/사천왕	Sa-cheonwang	Four heavenly kings
Vietnamese	四天王	Tứ Thiên Vương	Four heavenly kings
Vietnamese	四大天王	Tứ Đại Thiên Vương	Four great heavenly kings
Tibetan	རྒྱལ༌ཆེན༌བཞི༌	rgyal chen bzhi	Four great kings
Mongolian	ᠳᠤᠷᠪᠠᠨ ᠶᠡᠬᠡ ᠬᠠᠭᠠᠨ; Дөрвөн их хаан	Dörwön ih haan (dörben yeke qaɣan)	Four great kings
Mongolian	ᠳᠦᠷᠪᠡᠨ ᠮᠠᠾᠠᠷᠠᠨᠽᠠ Дөрвөн махранз	Dörwön Makhranz (Dörben maharanja)	Four great kings, loan word from mahārāja (Sanskrit)/mahārājan (Pali)
Thai	จาตุมหาราชา	Chatumaharacha	Four Great Kings, loan word from catumahārāja (Pali)
Thai	จตุโลกบาล	Chatulokkaban	Four Guardians of the World, loan word from catulokapāla (Pali)
Pali	Catu-Mahārāja	Catu-Mahārāja	The Four Great Kings

Individually, they have different names and features.

Pali name	Vessavaṇa	Virūḷhaka	Dhataraṭṭha	Virūpakkha
Devanagari Sanskrit romanization	वैश्रवण (कुबेर); Vaiśravaṇa (Kubera)	विरूढक; Virūḍhaka	धृतराष्ट्र; Dhṛtarāṣṭra	विरूपाक्ष; Virūpākṣa
Meaning	He who hears everything	He who causes to grow	He who upholds the realm	He who sees all
Control	yakṣas/yakkhas	kumbhāṇḍhas/kumbhaṇḍhas	gandharvas/gandhabbas	nāgas
Description	This is the chief of the four kings and protector of the north. He is the ruler of rain. His symbolic weapons are the umbrella or pagoda. Wearing heavy armor and carrying the umbrella in his right hand, he is often associated with the ancient Hindu god of wealth, Kubera. Associated with the color yellow or green.	King of the south and one who causes good growth of roots. He is the ruler of the wind. His symbolic weapon is the sword which he carries in his right hand to protect the Dharma and the southern continent. Associated with the color blue.	King of the east and god of music. His symbolic weapon is the pipa (stringed instrument). He is harmonious and compassionate and protects all beings. Uses his music to convert others to Buddhism. Associated with the color white.	King of the west and one who sees all. His symbolic weapon is a snake or red cord that is representative of a dragon. As the eye in the sky, he sees people who do not believe in Buddhism and converts them. His ancient name means "he who has broad objectives". Associated with the color red
Image	Chief of the four kings and protector of the north	King of the south and one who causes good growth of roots	King of the east and god of music	King of the west and one who sees all
Color	yellow or green	blue	white	red
Symbol	umbrella	sword	pipa	serpent
Symbol	mongoose	sword	pipa	stupa
Symbol	stupa	sword	pipa	pearl
Followers	yakṣas	kumbhāṇḍas	gandharvas	nāgas
Direction	north	south	east	west
Traditional/Simplified Chinese Pinyin	多聞天王 / 多闻天王; Duōwén Tiānwáng	增長天王 / 增长天王; Zēngzhǎng Tiānwáng	持國天王 / 持国天王; Chíguó Tiānwáng	廣目天王 / 广目天王; Guăngmù Tiānwáng
Traditional/Simplified Chinese Pinyin	毗沙門天 / 毗沙门天	留博叉天 / 留博叉天	多羅吒天 / 多罗吒天	毗琉璃天 / 毗琉璃天
Kanji Hepburn romanization	多聞天 (毘沙門天); Tamon-ten (Bishamon-ten)	増長天; Zōchō-ten	持国天; Jikoku-ten	広目天; Kōmoku-ten
Kanji Hepburn romanization	多聞天 (毘沙門天); Tamon-ten (Bishamon-ten)	増長天; Zōchō-ten	治国天; Jikoku-ten	広目天; Kōmoku-ten
Hangul romanized Korean	다문천왕; Damun-cheonwang	증장천왕 增長天王; Jeungjang-cheonwang	지국천왕 持國天王; Jiguk-cheonwang	광목천왕 廣目天王; Gwangmok-cheonwang
Vietnamese alphabet Chữ Hán	Đa Văn Thiên Vương 多聞天王	Tăng Trưởng Thiên Vương 增長天王	Trì Quốc Thiên Vương 持國天王	Quảng Mục Thiên Vương 廣目天王
Burmese Script	ဝေဿဝဏ္ဏနတ်မင်း (Wethawun Nat Min) ကုဝေရနတ်မင်း (Kuwera Nat Min)	ဝိရူဠကနတ်မင်း (Wirulakka Nat Min)	ဓတရဋ္ဌနတ်မင်း (Datarattha Nat Min)	ဝိရူပက္ခနတ်မင်း (Wirupakkha Nat Min)
Tibetan alphabet and romanization	རྣམ་ཐོས་སྲས་ (Namthöse)	ཕགས་སྐྱེས་པོ་ (Phakyepo)	ཡུལ་འཁོར་སྲུང་ (Yülkhorsung)	སྤྱན་མི་བཟང་ (Chenmizang)
Mongolian Script and Mongolian Cyrillic and Mongolian Latin alphabet	ᠨᠠᠮᠰᠠᠷᠠᠢ Намсрай Namsrai (Namsarai)	ᠫᠠᠭᠵᠢᠪᠣ Пагжийбуу Pagjiibuu (Pagjibu)	ᠶᠣᠯᠬᠣᠷᠰᠦᠷᠦᠩ Ёлхорсүрэн Yolkhorsüren (Yolhursürüng)	ᠵᠠᠨᠮᠢᠰᠠᠨ Жамийсан/Жанмисан Jamiisan/Janmisan (Janmisan)
Thai script romanization	ท้าวเวสวัณ (Thao Wetsawan) ท้าวเวสสุวรรณ (Thao Wetsuwan) ท้าวกุเวร (Thao Kuwen)	ท้าววิรุฬหก (Thao Wirunhok)	ท้าวธตรฐ (Thao Thatarot)	ท้าววิรูปักษ์ (Thao Wirupak)

Four Heavenly Kings statues at the royal crematorium of King Bhumibol Adulyadej of Thailand

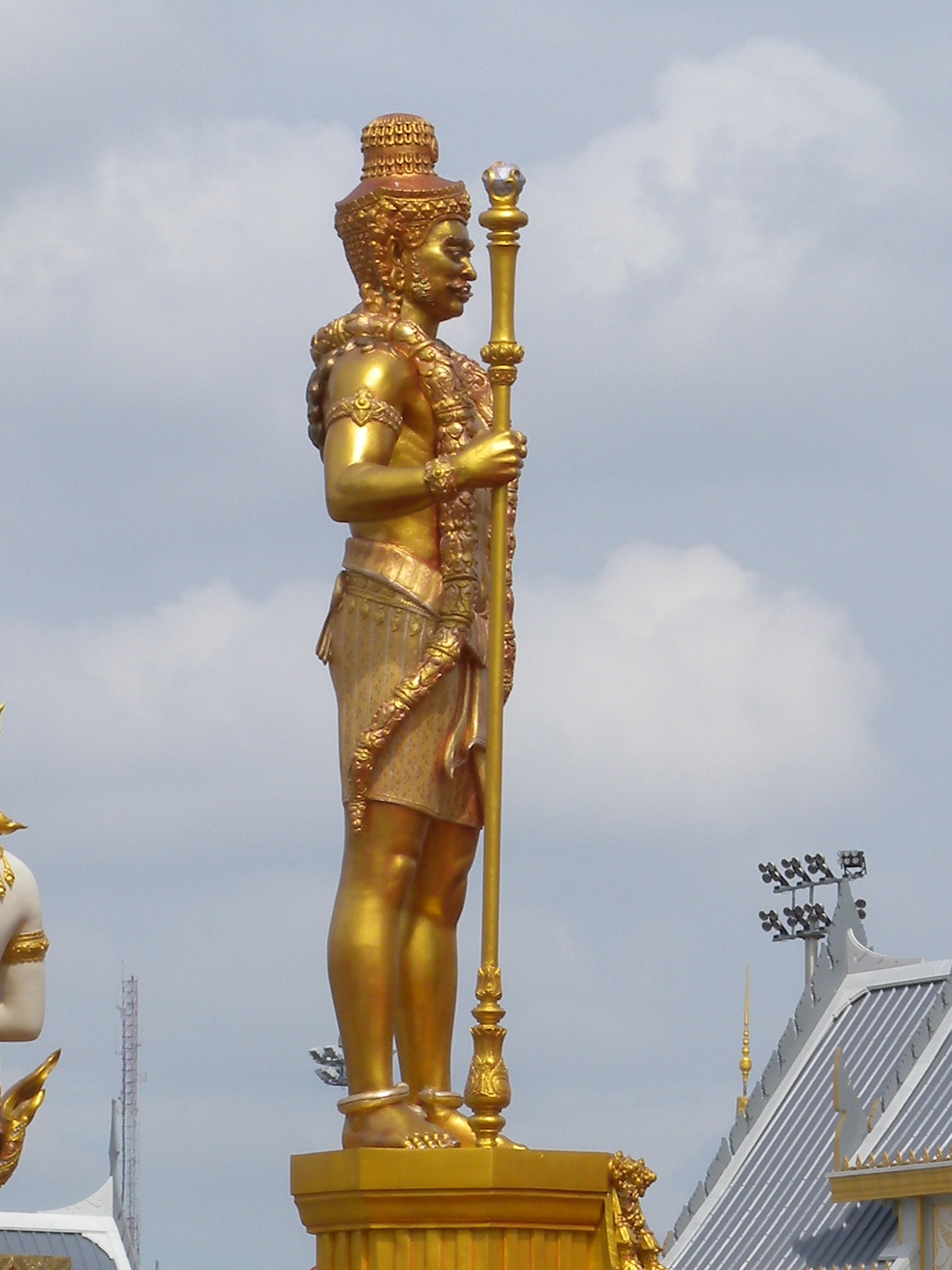
Vaiśravaṇa of the north direction, king of yakṣas.

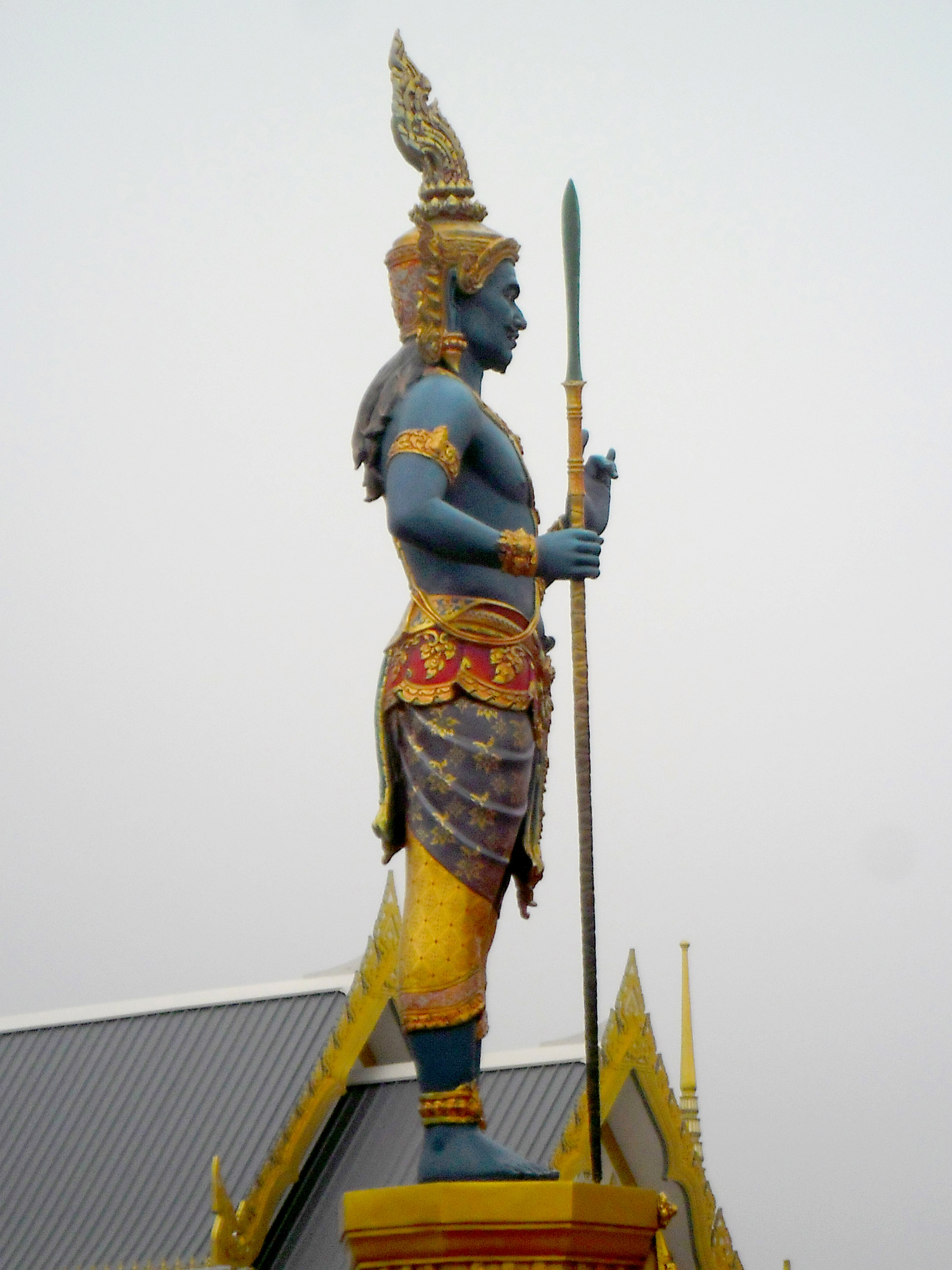
Virūḍhaka of the south direction, king of kumbhāṇḍas.

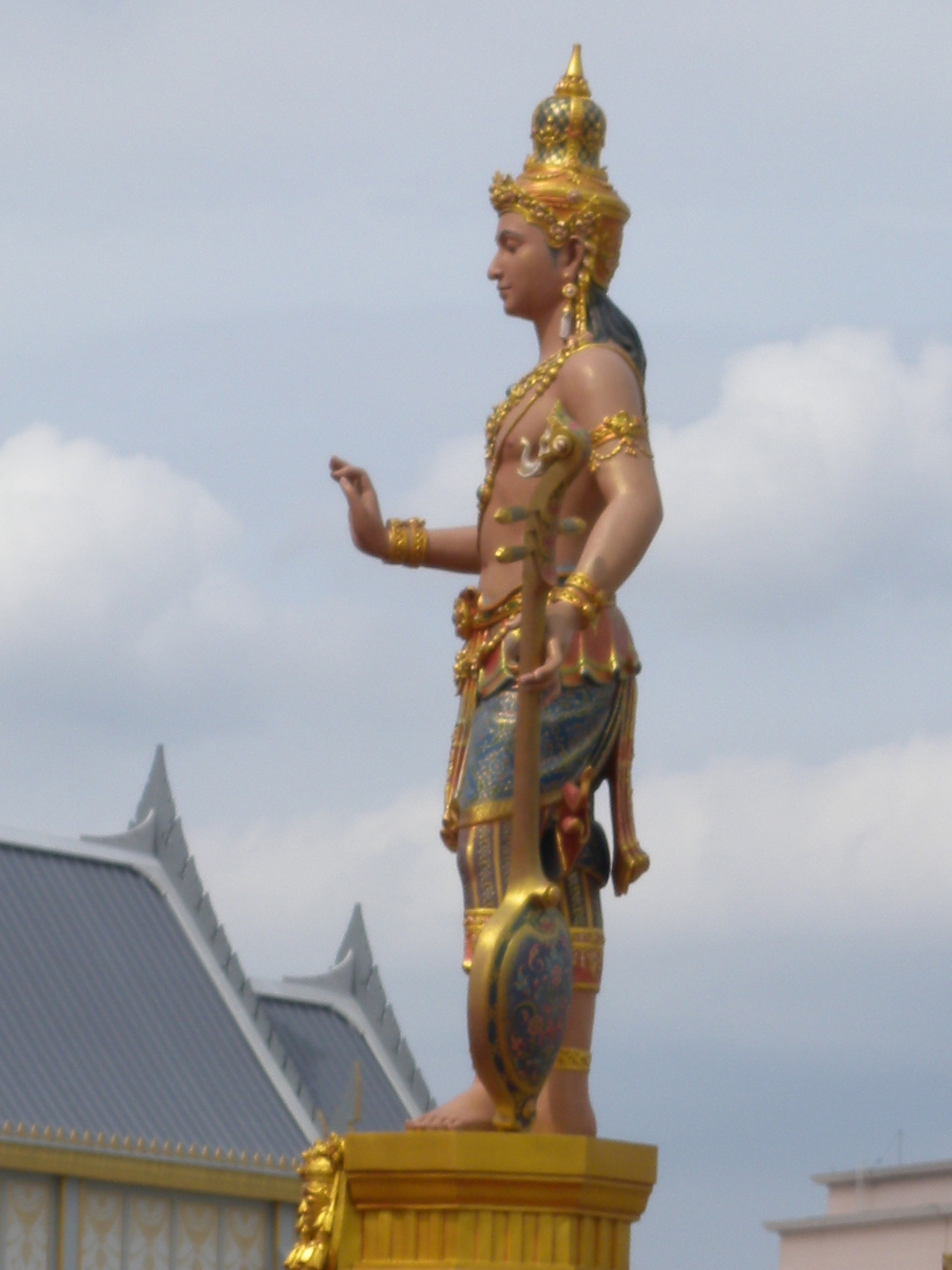
Dhṛtarāṣṭra of the east direction, king of gandharvas.

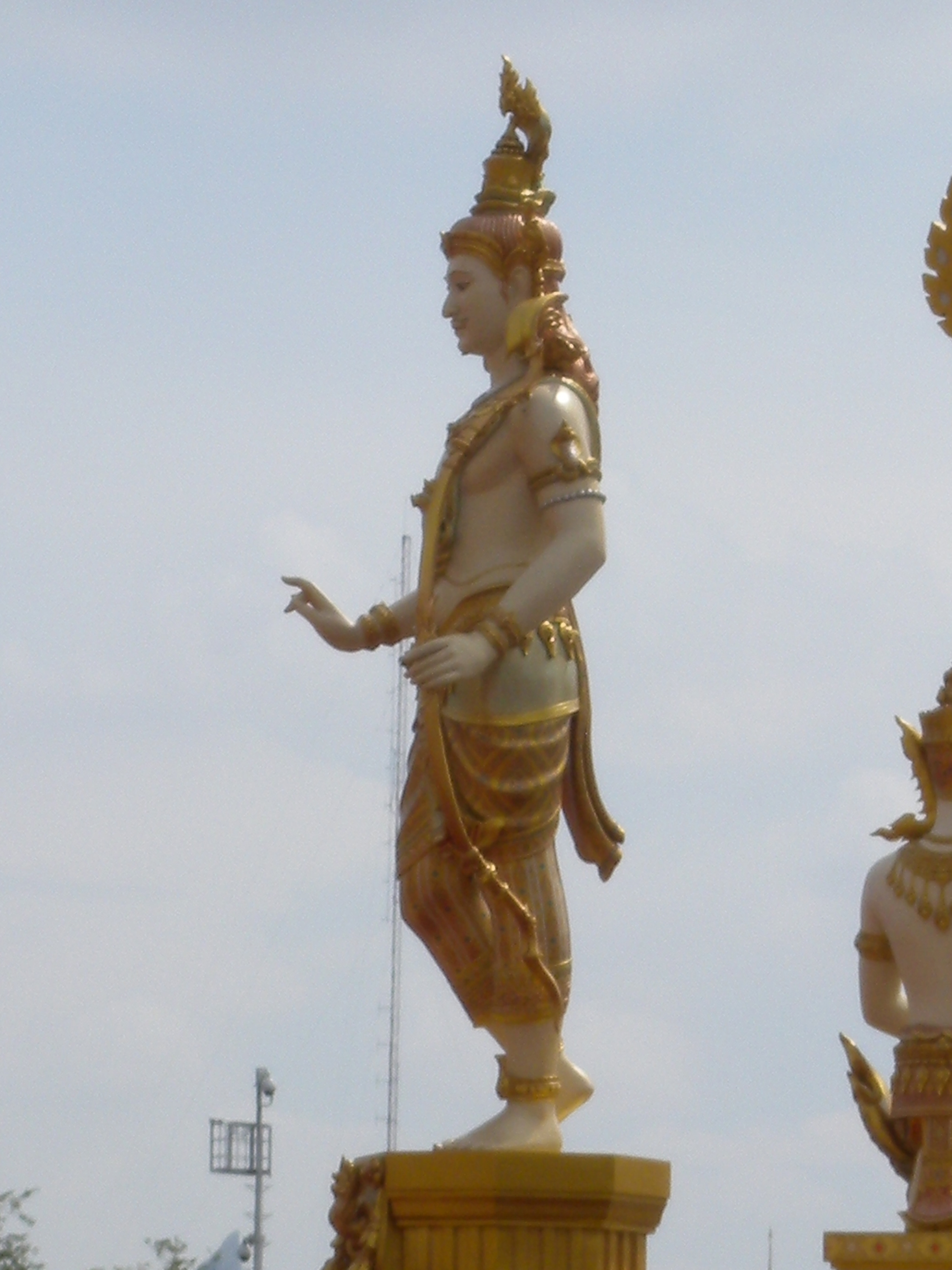
Virūpākṣa of the west direction, king of nāgas.

== Mythology ==
All four Kings serve Śakra, the lord of the devas of Trāyastriṃśa. On the 8th, 14th and 15th days of each lunar month, the Kings either send out emissaries or go themselves to inspect the state of virtue and morality in the world of men. Then they report their findings to the assembly of the Trāyastriṃśa devas.

On the orders of Śakra, the Kings and their retinues stand guard to protect Trāyastriṃśa from another attack by the Asuras, which once threatened to destroy the realm of the devas. They also vowed to protect the Buddha, the Dharma, and the Buddha's followers from danger. In Chinese Buddhism, all four of the heavenly kings are regarded as four of the Twenty Devas (二十諸天 Èrshí Zhūtiān) or the Twenty-Four Devas (二十四諸天 Èrshísì zhūtiān), a group of Buddhist dharmapalas who manifest to protect the Dharma.

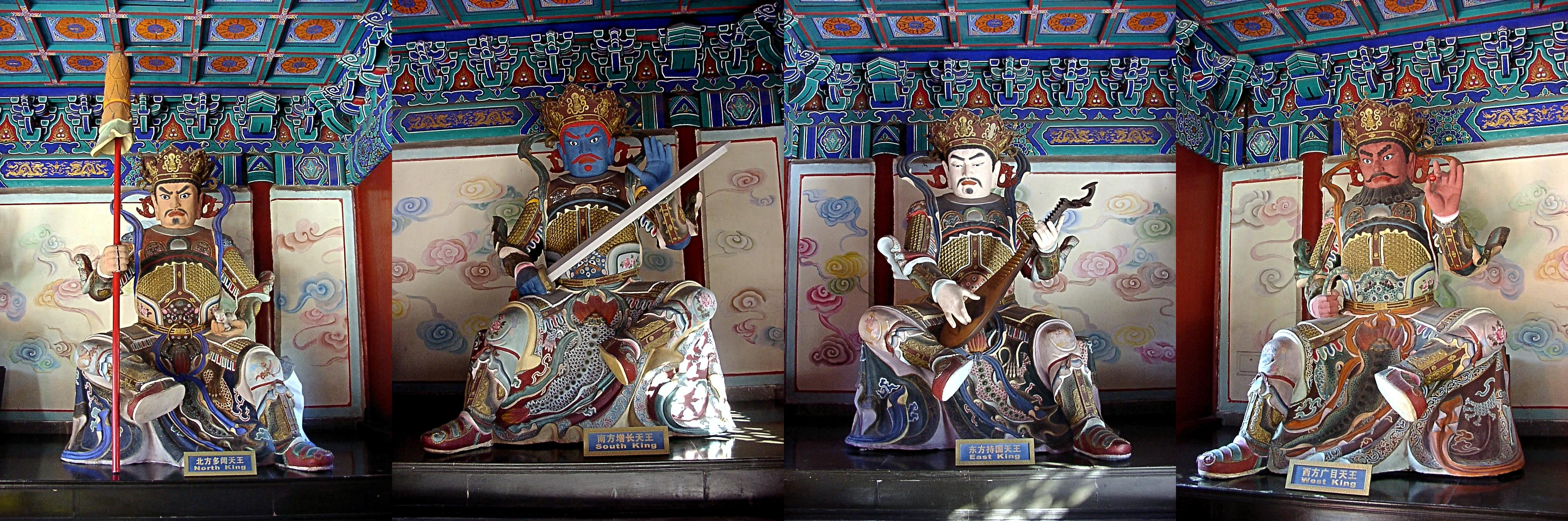
Statues of the Four Heavenly Kings. From left to right: Vaiśravaṇa, Virūḍhaka, Dhṛtarāṣṭra, and Virūpākṣa in Beihai Park in Beijing, China.

According to Vasubandhu, devas born in the Cāturmahārājika heaven are 1/4 of a krośa in height (about 750 feet tall). They have a five-hundred-year lifespan, of which each day is equivalent to 50 years in our world; thus their total lifespan amounts to about nine million years (other sources say 90,000 years).

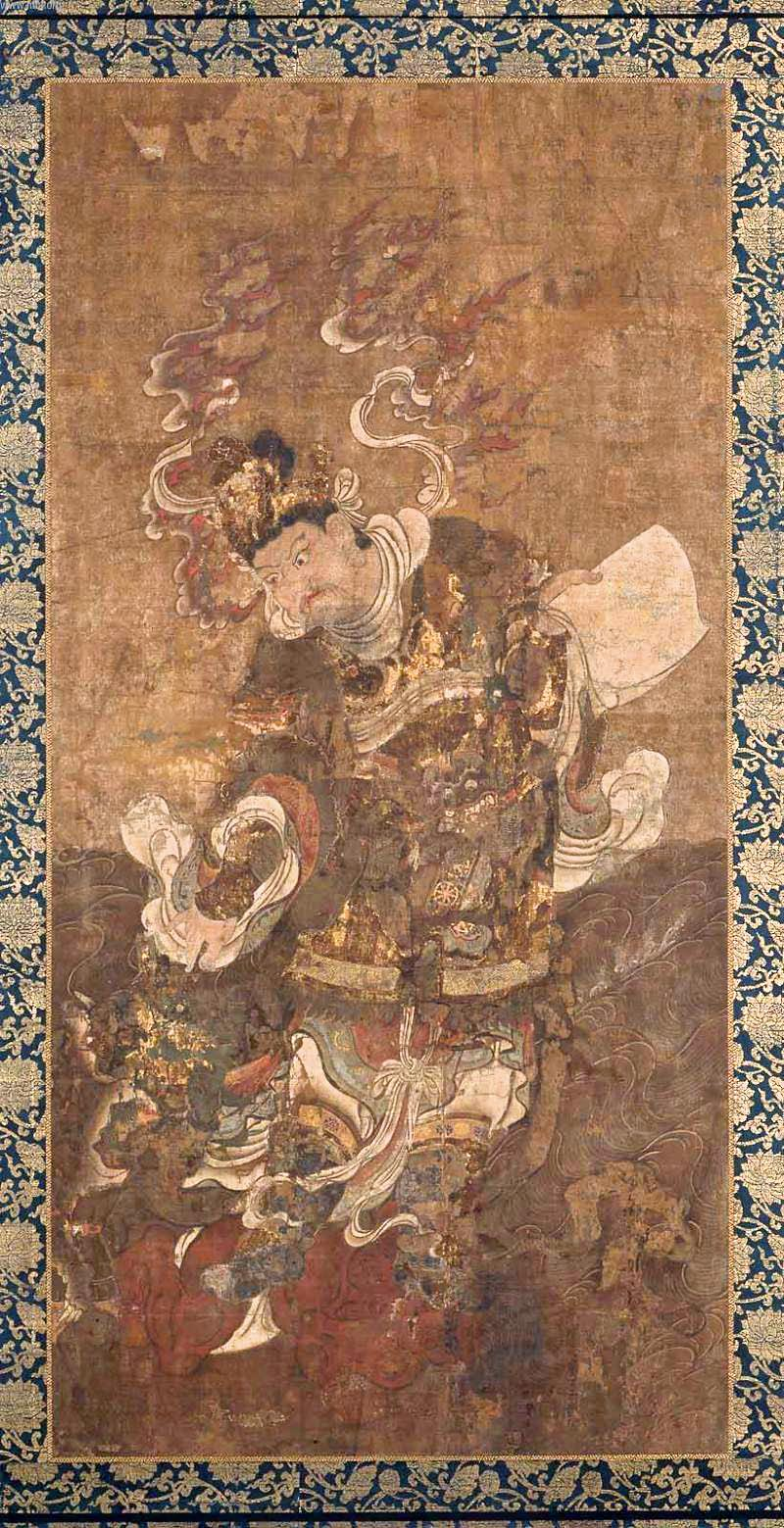
Painting of Kōmokuten (Virūpākṣa), the Guardian of the West (one of the Four Guardian Kings). 13th century, Japan.

The attributes borne by each King also link them to their followers; for instance, the nāgas, magical creatures who can change form between human and serpent, are led by Virūpākṣa, represented by a snake; the gandharvas are celestial musicians, led by Dhṛtarāṣṭra, represented with a lute. The umbrella was a symbol of regal sovereignty in ancient India, and the sword is a symbol of martial prowess. Vaiśravaṇa's mongoose, which ejects jewels from its mouth, is said to represent generosity in opposition to greed.

Vaiśravaṇa

(north)

Virūpākṣa

(west)

Heavenly Kings
Dhṛtarāṣṭra

(east)

Virūḍhaka

(south)

== Gallery ==
Statues of the Four Heavenly Kings of Lingyin Temple, Hangzhou, Zhejiang, China.

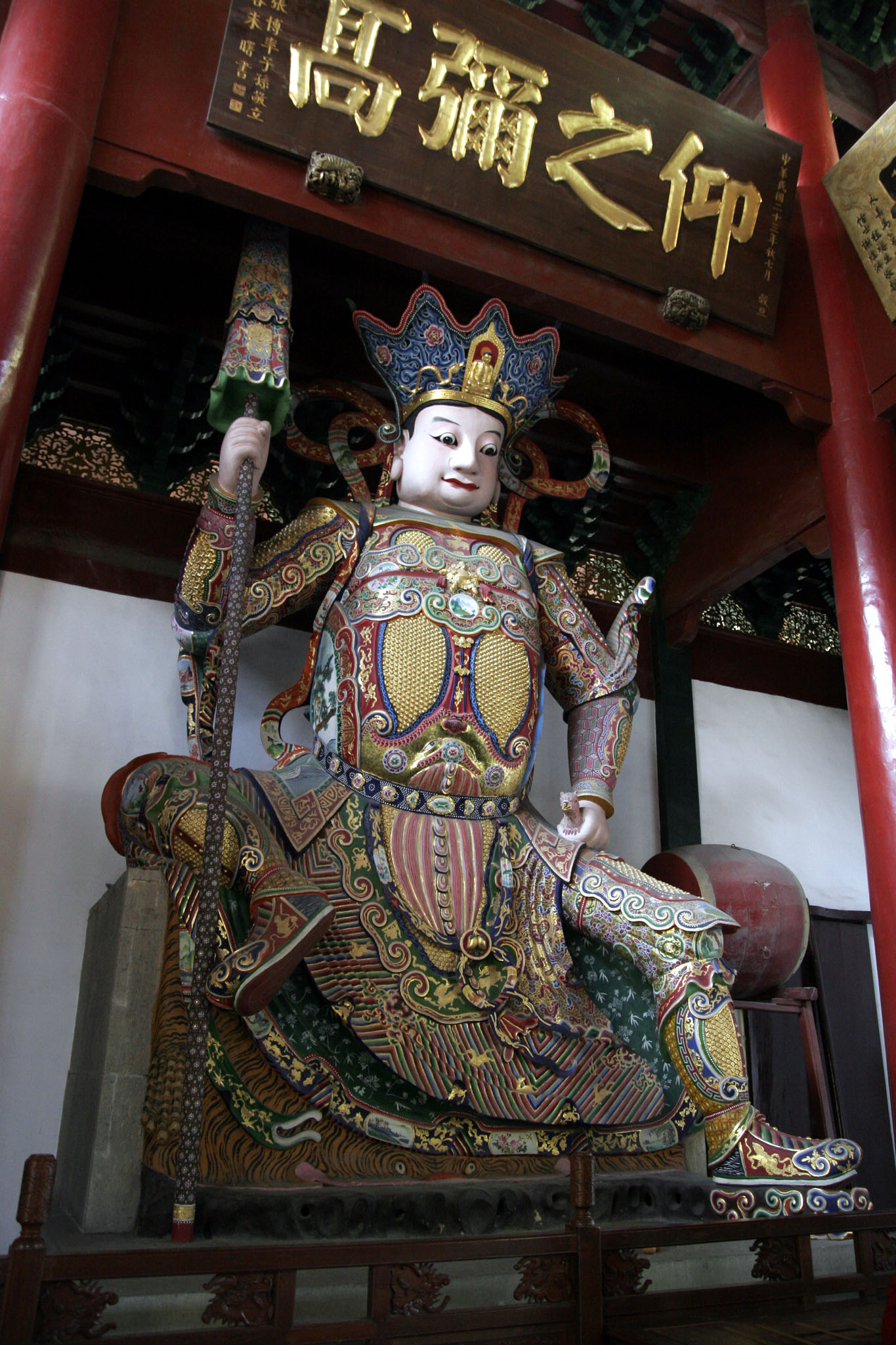
Duowen Tianwang (north)

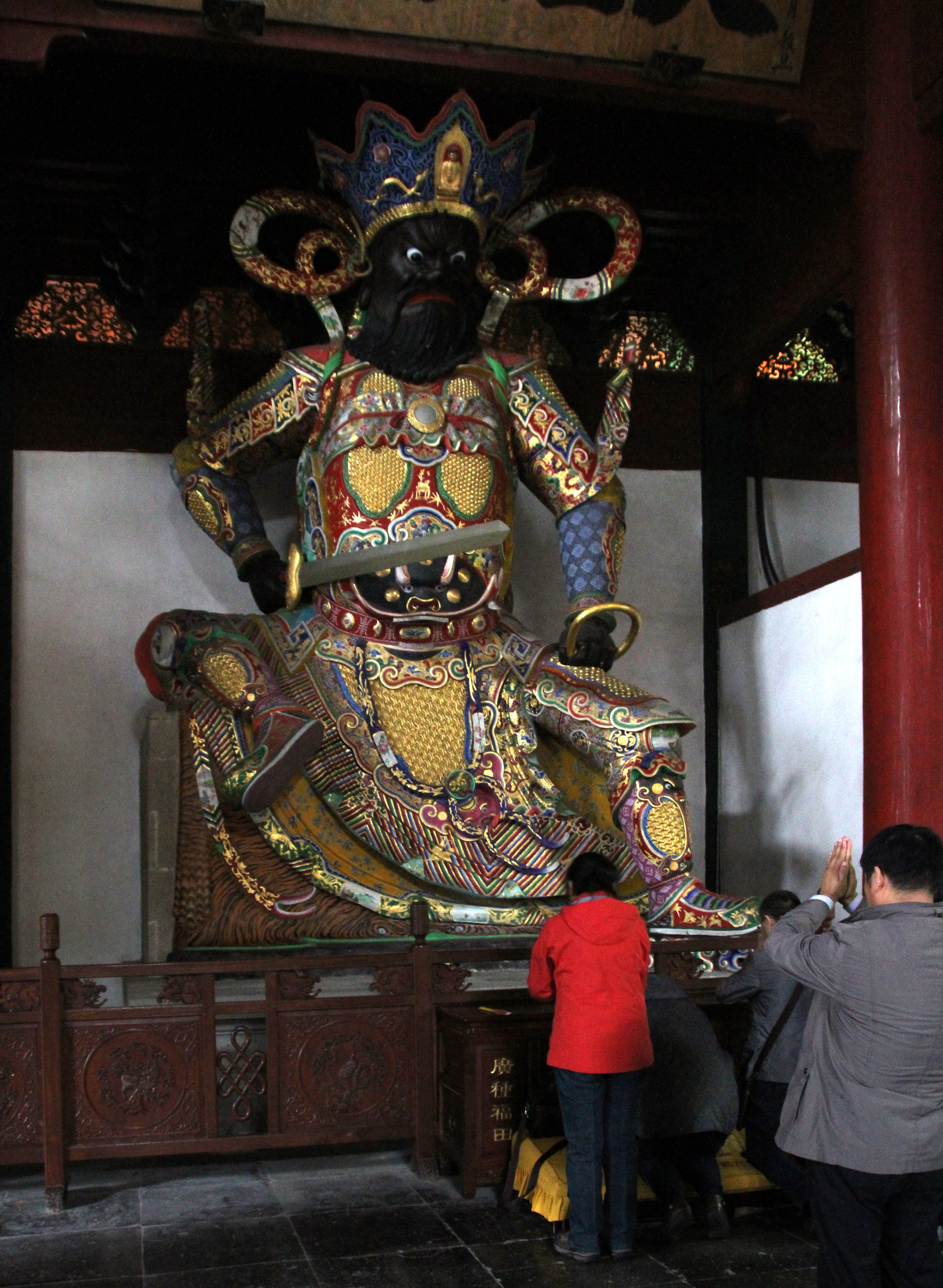
Zengzhang Tianwang (south)

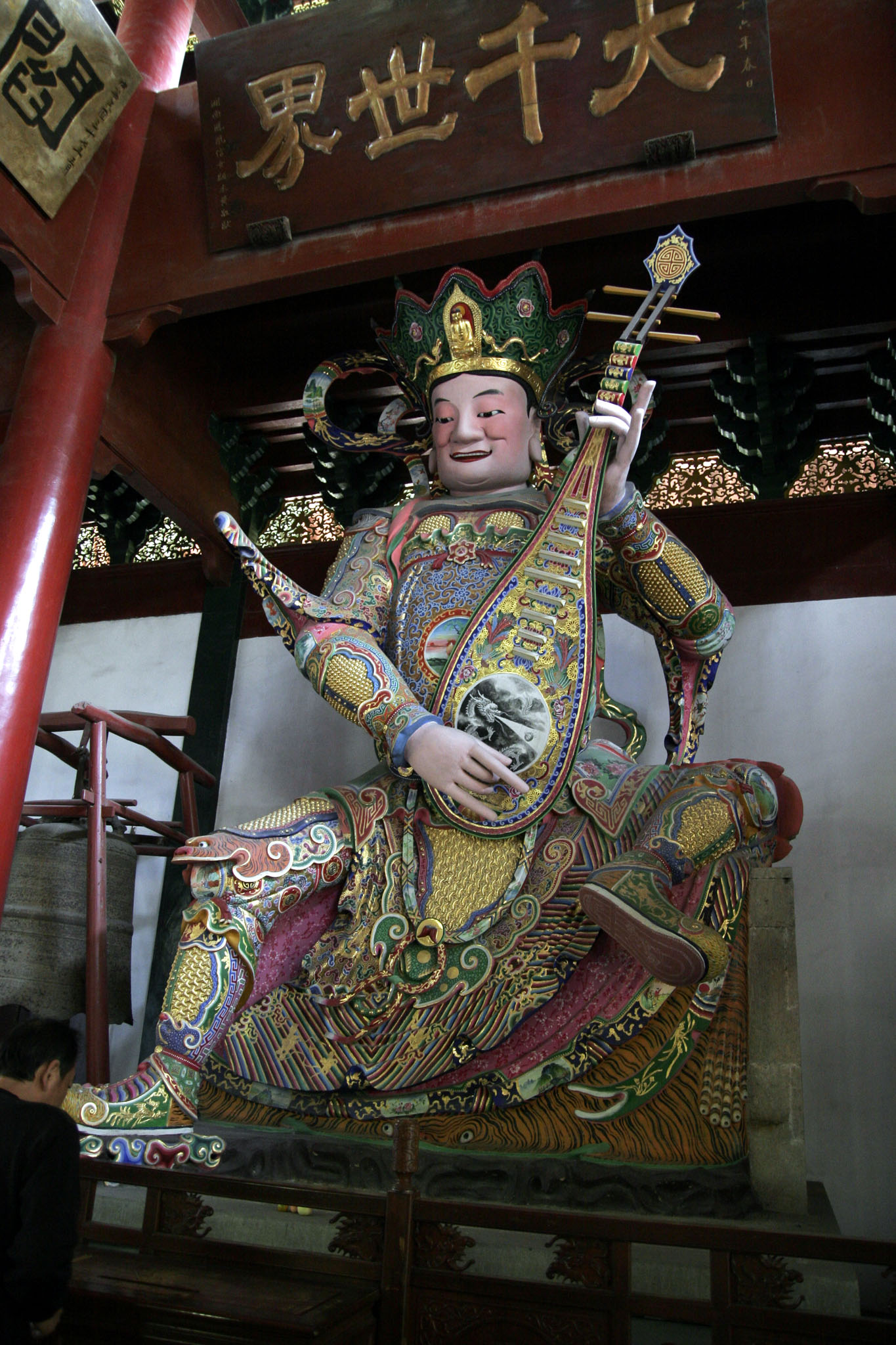
Chiguo Tianwang (east)

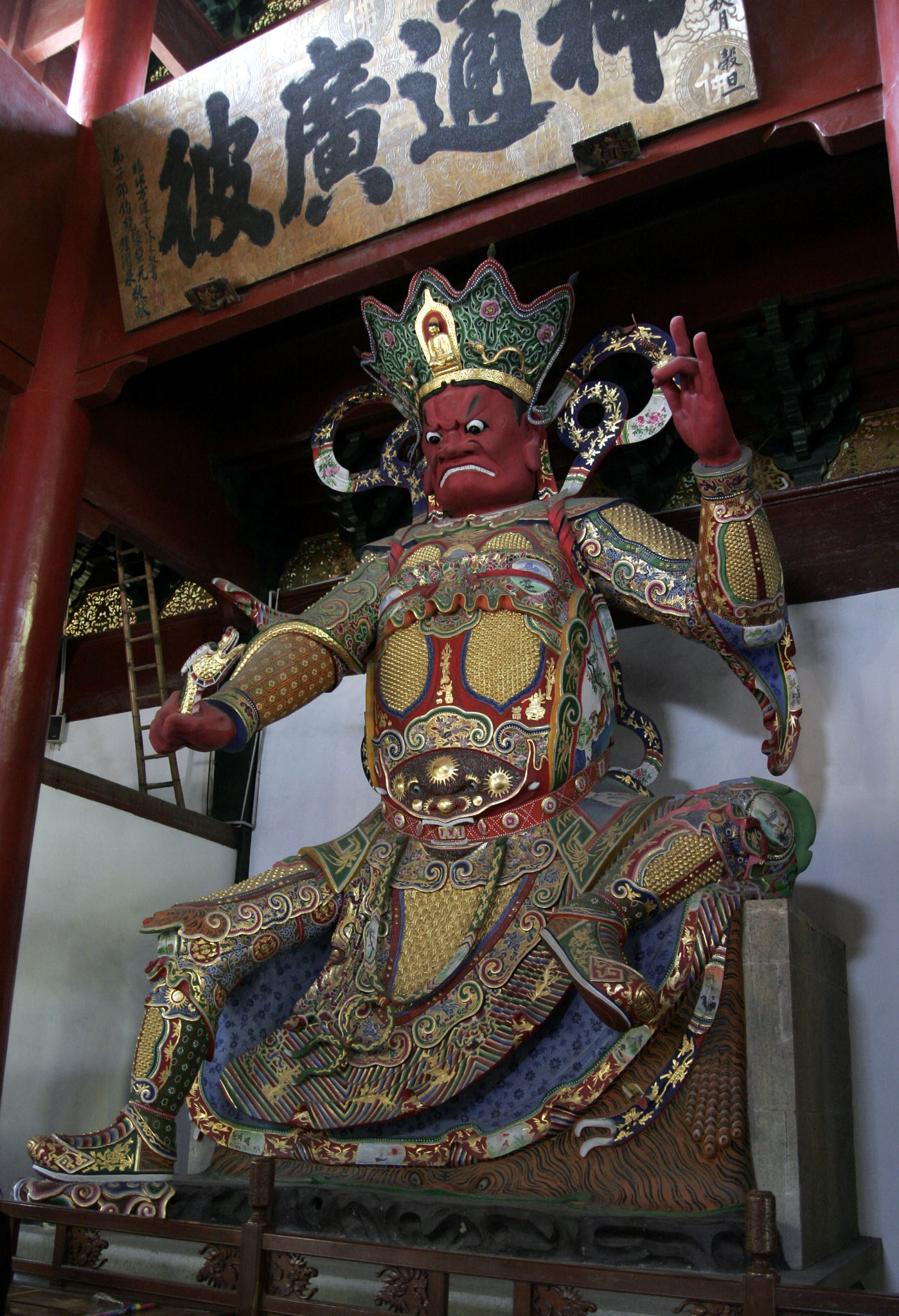
Guangmu Tianwang (west)
Statues of the Four Heavenly Kings of Jikō-ji, Takasago, Hyōgo, Japan.

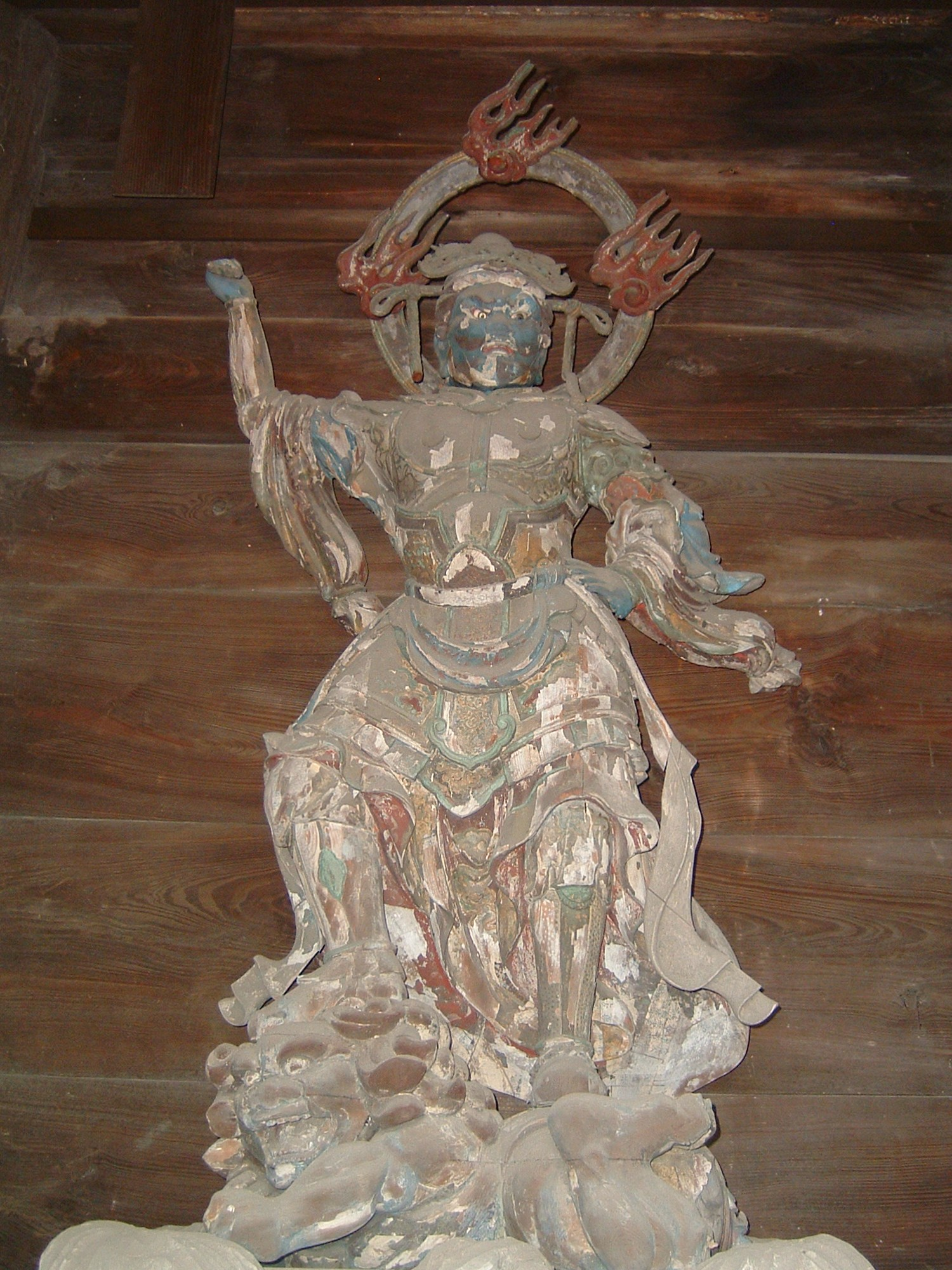
Jikoku-ten (east)

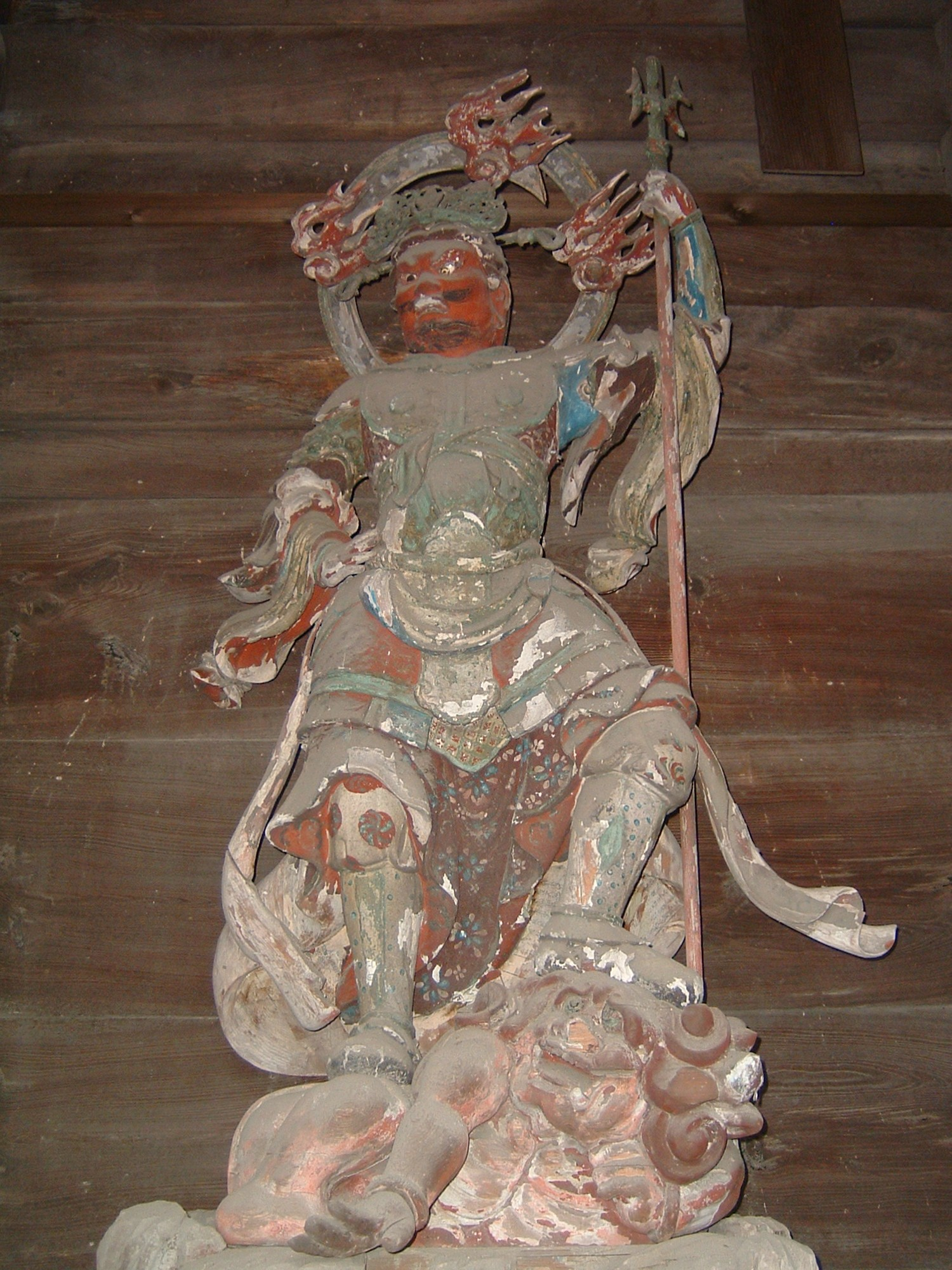
Zōjō-ten (south)

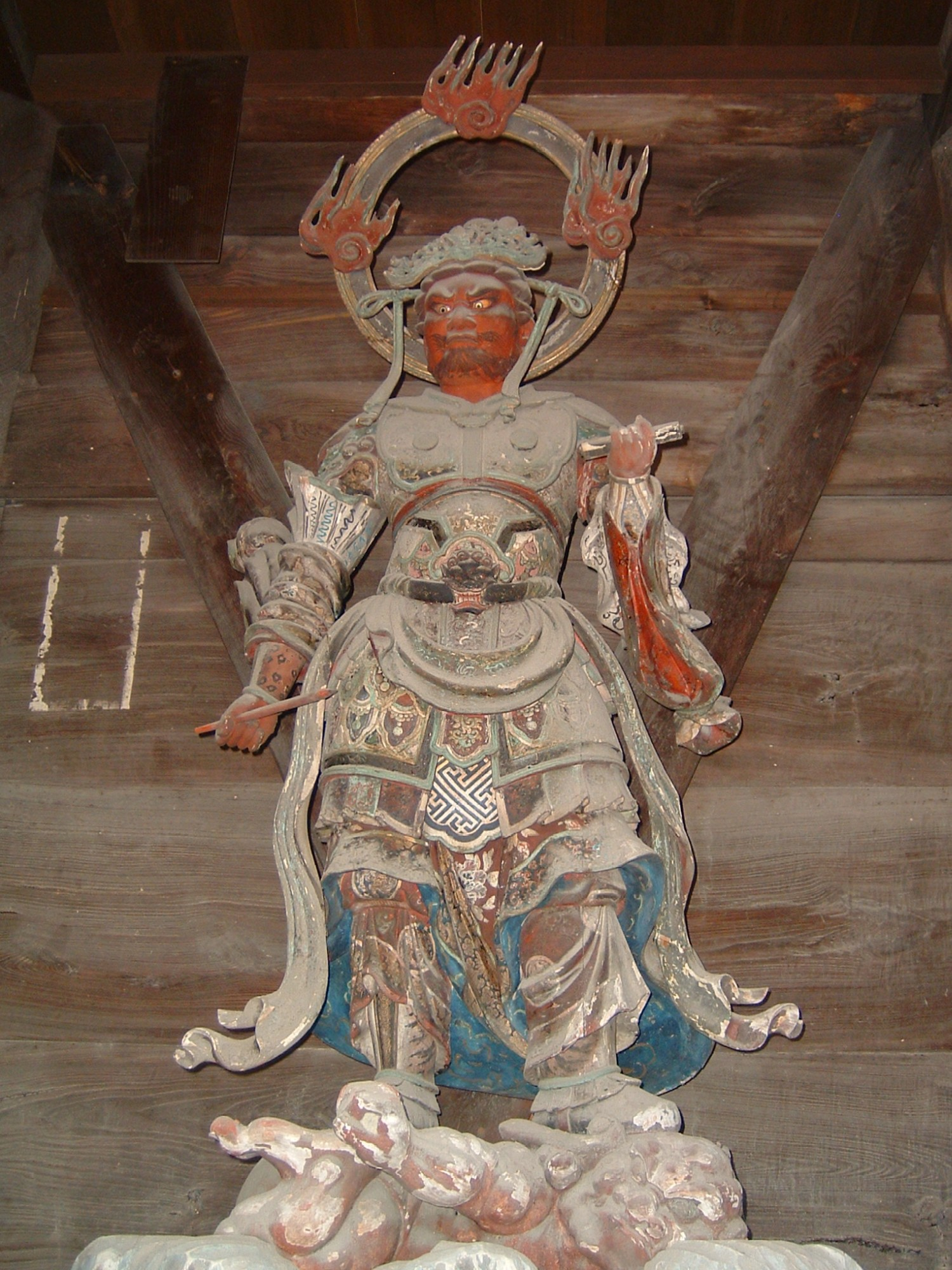
Kōmoku-ten (west)

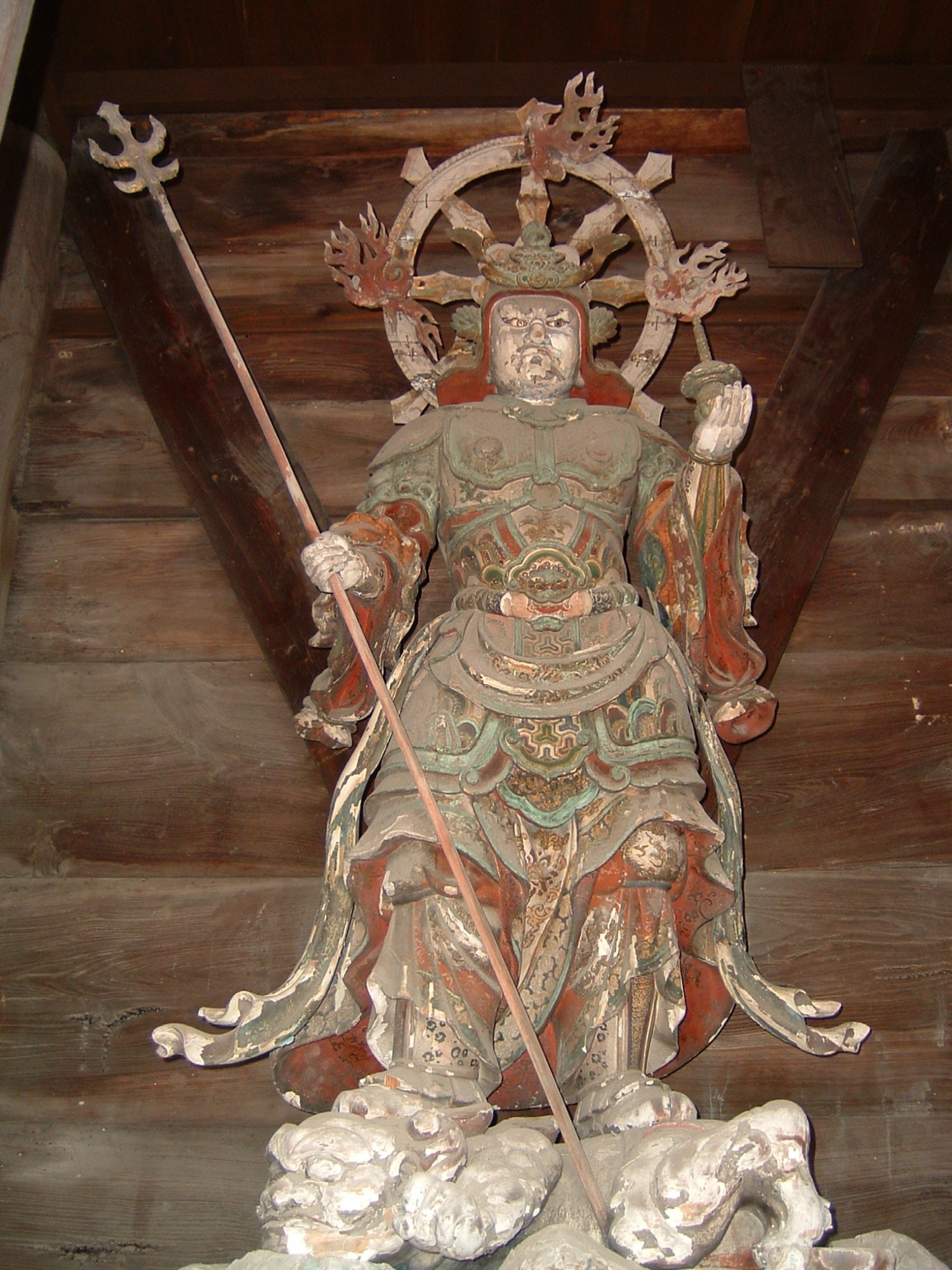
Tamon-ten (north)

== Popular culture ==
- In Japanese professional wrestling, the group of Mitsuharu Misawa, Kenta Kobashi, Toshiaki Kawada, and Akira Taue of All Japan Pro-Wrestling are commonly referred to as the Four Heavenly Kings of Pro Wrestling.
- In the Hong Kong entertainment industry, Andy Lau, Jacky Cheung, Leon Lai, Aaron Kwok are known as the Four Heavenly Kings.
- In the manga Sailor Moon, the Four Heavenly Kings are the former bodyguards of Endymion and feature as major antagonists under the evil Queen Beryl in the first arc of every adaptation of the franchise.
- In the mid-to-late 1990s, Malice Mizer, La'cryma Christi, Fanatic Crisis and Shazna were known as the Four Heavenly Kings of the visual kei scene.

== See also ==
- Anemoi
- Bacab
- Four Dwarves (Norse mythology)
- Four Holy Beasts
- Four Living Creatures
- Four sons of Horus
- Four Stags (Norse mythology)
- Four Symbols
- Four temperaments
- Guardians of the directions
- Lokapala
- Royal stars
- Svetovid
- Tetramorph
- Watchtower
