= Virūḍhaka (Heavenly King) =

Major deity in Buddhism

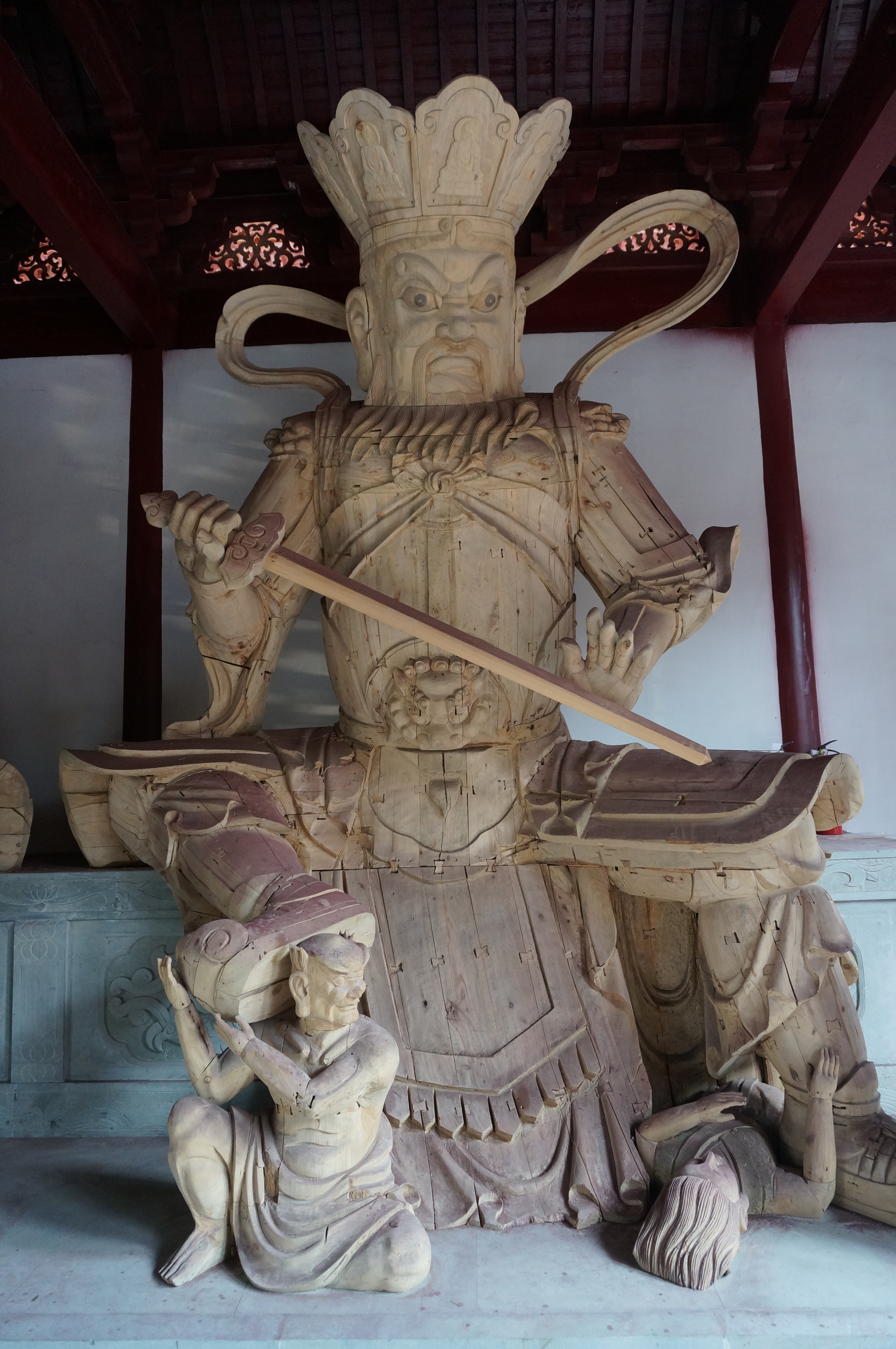
- Statue of Virudhaka (增長天王), in the Hall of Four Heavenly Kings in Lingyun Temple (凌雲寺) in Leshan, Sichuan, China
- Sanskrit: विरूढक; Virūḍhaka
- Pāli: विरूळ्हक; Virūḷhaka
- Burmese: ဝိရဠက
- Chinese: 增長天王 (Pinyin: Zēngzhǎng Tiānwáng)
- Indonesian: Wirudhaka
- Japanese: 増長天 (romaji: Zōjōten or Zōchōten)
- Korean: 증장천왕 (RR: Jeungjang Cheonwang)
- Tagalog: Birudhaka
- Thai: ท้าววิรุฬหก; Thao Virunhok
- Tibetan: འཕགས་སྐྱེས་པོ Wylie: 'phags skyes po THL: Pak Kyepo
- Vietnamese: Tăng Trưởng Thiên Vương

Information
- Venerated by: Theravāda: (Ātānātiya Sutta); (Mahāsamāya Sutta); Mahāyāna: (Golden Light Sutra); (Lalitavistara Sūtra); (Lotus Sutra); (Mahāmāyūrī Vidyārājñī Sūtra)
- Attributes: Guardian of the South

Virūḍhaka is a major deity in Buddhism. He is one of the Four Heavenly Kings, a lokapāla and a dharmapala.

== Names ==
The name Virūḍhaka comes from the identical Sanskrit term, which refers to sprouting grain. As such, his name means "increase" or "growth". Other names include:

- Traditional Chinese: 增長天; simplified Chinese: 増長天; pinyin: Zēngzhǎng Tiānwáng; Japanese: Zōjōten or Zōchōten; Korean: 증장천왕 Jeungjang Cheonwang; Tagalog: Birudhaka; Vietnamese: Tăng Trưởng Thiên, a calque of Sanskrit Virūḍhaka
- Traditional Chinese: 毘樓勒叉; pinyin: Bí lóu lè chā; Japanese: Birurokusha; Korean: 비루늑차Biluneugcha; Vietnamese: Tì Lâu Lặc Xoa. This is a transliteration of the original Sanskrit name.
- Tibetan: འཕགས་སྐྱེས་པོ, Wylie: 'phags skyes po, THL: Pak Kyepo, "Noble Birth"
- Thai: ท้าววิรุฬหก Thao Virunhok is an honorific plus the modern pronunciation of Pali Virūḷhaka.

== Characteristics ==
Virūḍhaka is the guardian of the southern direction and the leader of the Kumbhanda and pretas. He lives on the southern part of Sumeru.

== Theravāda ==
In the Pāli Canon of Theravāda Buddhism, Virūḍhaka is called Virūlha or Virūḷhaka. Virūḷhaka is one of the Cātummahārājāno, or "Four Great Kings," each of whom rules over a specific direction.

== China ==
In China, Virūḍhaka's name Zēngzhǎng Tiānwáng (增長天 lit. Growth King) is a reference to his ability to teach sentient beings to grow in compassion. In Chinese temples, he is often enshrined within the Hall of the Heavenly Kings (天王殿) with the other three Heavenly Kings. In iconographic form, he is clad in armor while brandishing a sword. He is also regarded as one of the Twenty Devas (二十諸天 Èrshí Zhūtiān) or the Twenty-Four Devas (二十四諸天 Èrshísì zhūtiān), a group of Buddhist dharmapalas who manifest to protect the Dharma.

== Japan ==
In Japan, Zōjōten (増長天) is commonly depicted with a fierce expression. He is clad in armor, often brandishing a sword or spear while trampling a jaki.

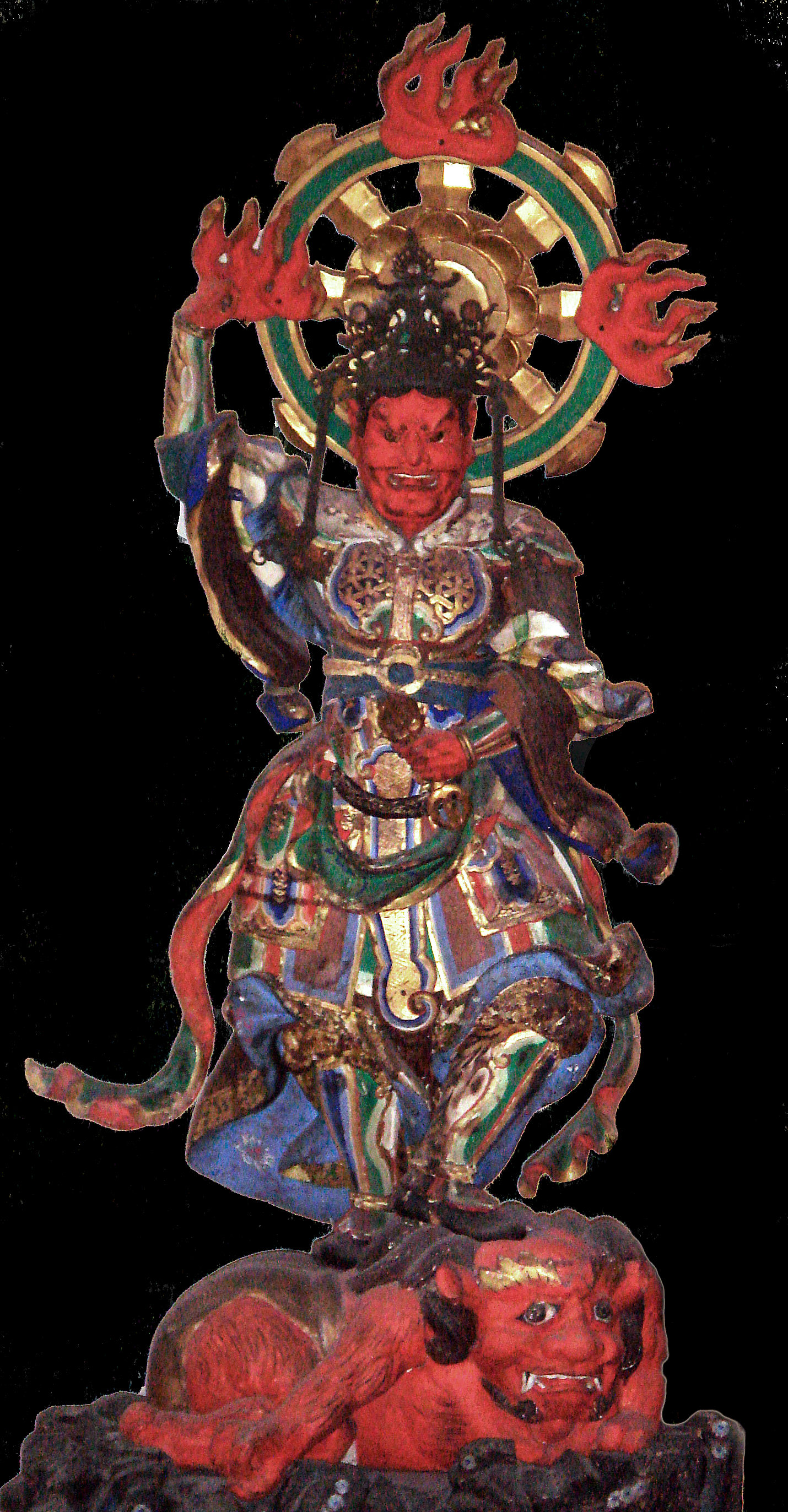
The Heavenly King Zōchō.
