= Virūpākṣa =

One of the Four Heavenly Kings and a dharmapala

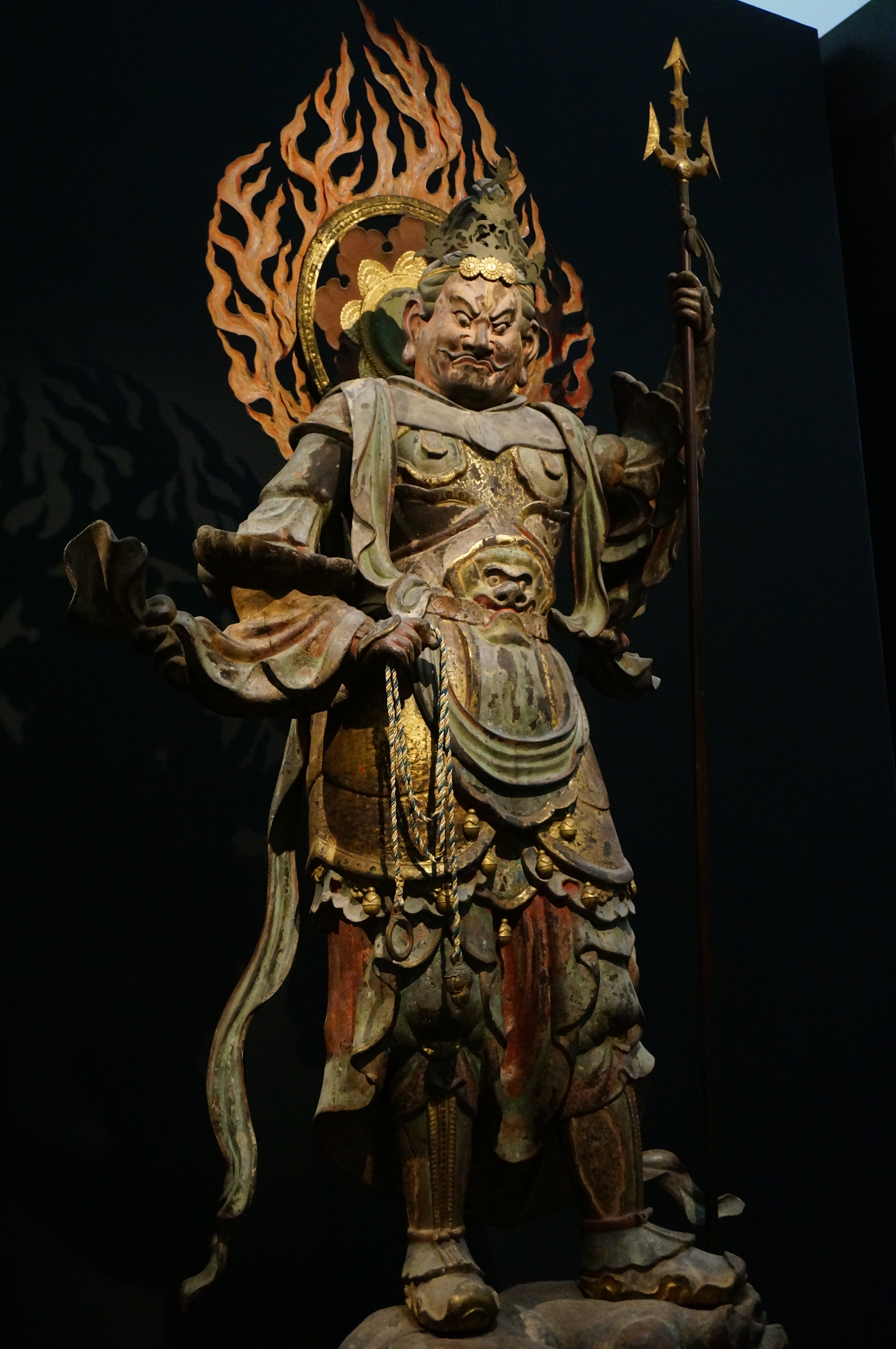
- Statue of Virūpākṣa. Jōruri-ji, Japan.
- Sanskrit: विरूपाक्ष; Virūpākṣa
- Pāli: Virūpakkha
- Burmese: ဝိရူပက္ခနတ်မင်း (Romanization: "Wirupakkha Nat Min")
- Chinese: 廣目天王 (Pinyin: Guǎngmù Tiānwáng)
- Japanese: 広目天 (romaji: Kōmokuten)
- Korean: 광목천왕 (RR: Gwangmok Cheonwang)
- Tagalog: Bilupaksa
- Thai: ท้าววิรูปักษ์ Thao Wirupak
- Tibetan: སྤྱན་མི་བཟང; Wylie: spyan mi bzang THL: Chen Mi Zang
- Vietnamese: Quảng Mục Thiên Vương

Information
- Venerated by: Theravāda: (Ātānātiya Sutta); (Mahāsamāya Sutta); Mahāyāna: (Golden Light Sutra); (Lalitavistara Sūtra); (Lotus Sutra); (Mahāmāyūrī Vidyārājñī Sūtra)
- Attributes: Guardian of the West

Virūpākṣa (Sanskrit; Pali: Virūpakkha; traditional Chinese: 廣目天王; simplified Chinese: 广目天王; pinyin: Guǎngmù Tiānwáng; Japanese: 広目天 Kōmokuten) is a major deity in Buddhism. He is one of the Four Heavenly Kings and a dharmapala.

== Names ==
The name Virūpākṣa is a Sanskrit compound of the words virūpa (ugly; deformed) and akṣa (eyes). Buddhaghosa interpreted virūpa as also meaning "various", which lends to the understanding that Virūpākṣa is endowed with clairvoyance. Other names include:

- Traditional Chinese: 廣目天王; simplified Chinese: 广目天王; pinyin: Guǎngmù Tiānwáng; Korean: 광목천왕 Gwangmok Cheonwang; Vietnamese: Quảng Mục Thiên Vương, a calque of Sanskrit Virūpākṣa
- Traditional Chinese: 毘楼博叉; pinyin: Bílóubóchā; Japanese: Birubakusha; Korean: 비류박차 Bilyubagcha; Tagalog: Bilupaksa; Vietnamese: Tỳ Lưu Bác Xoa. This is a transliteration of the original Sanskrit name.
- Tibetan: སྤྱན་མི་བཟང, Wylie: spyan mi bzang, THL Chen Mi Zang, "Ugly Eyes", a calque of Sanskrit Virūpākṣa
- Thai: ท้าววิรูปักษ์ Thao Wirupak is an honorific plus the modern pronunciation of Pali Virūpakkha.

== Characteristics ==
Virūpākṣa is the guardian of the western direction. He lives on the western part of Sumeru. He is leader of the nāgas.

He possesses the divine eye (Skt. divyena cakṣuṣā), which allows him to see great distances as well as the karma of sentient beings.

== Theravāda ==
In the Pāli Canon of Theravāda Buddhism, Virūpākṣa is called Virūpakkha. Virūpakkha is one of the Cātummahārājāno, or "Four Great Kings," each of whom rules over a specific direction.

He has a daughter named Kālakannī.

== China ==
In China, Guǎngmù Tiānwáng (廣目天王) is commonly depicted as having red skin and clad in armor. He is often depicted as gripping a red naga or a red lasso in his hands, which he uses to snare people into the Buddhist faith. In Chinese temples, he is often enshrined within the Hall of the Heavenly Kings (天王殿) with the other three Heavenly Kings. He is also regarded as one of the Twenty Devas (二十諸天 Èrshí Zhūtiān) or the Twenty-Four Devas (二十四諸天 Èrshísì zhūtiān), a group of Buddhist dharmapalas who manifest to protect the Dharma.

== Japan ==
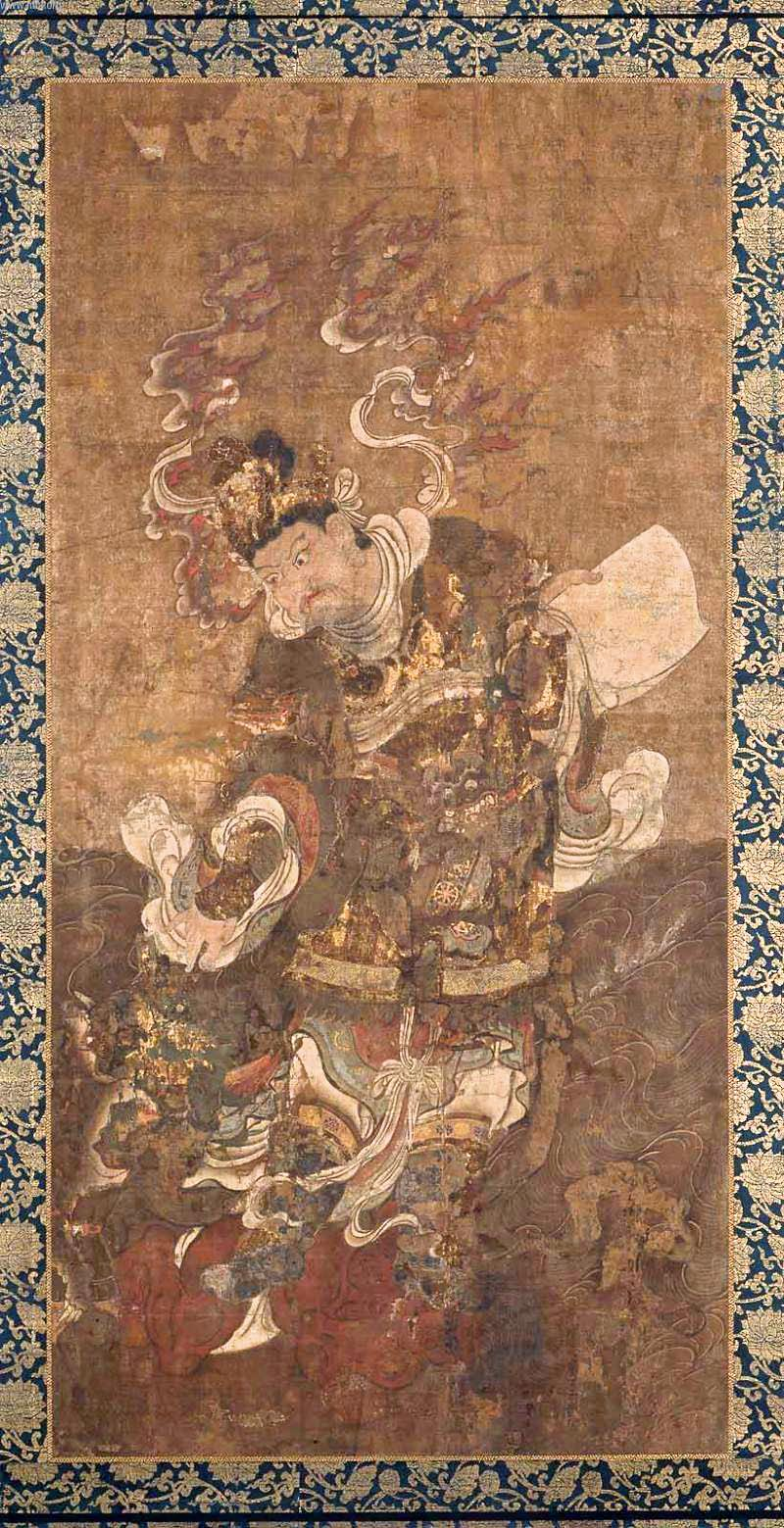
Painting of Kōmokuten

In Japan, Kōmokuten (広目天) is commonly depicted holding a brush in his right hand and a scroll in his left hand. This iconography was used primarily in the Tempyō period, and variations appeared after the Heian period. He is commonly seen wearing Tang period military armor while trampling a jaki (悪鬼).

In the Womb Realm Mandala of the esoteric tradition, Kōmokuten is depicted as having red skin, holding a trident in his right hand while holding a fist with his left hand. One variation includes him wielding a snare.

== See also ==
- Virupa
- Birupakshya

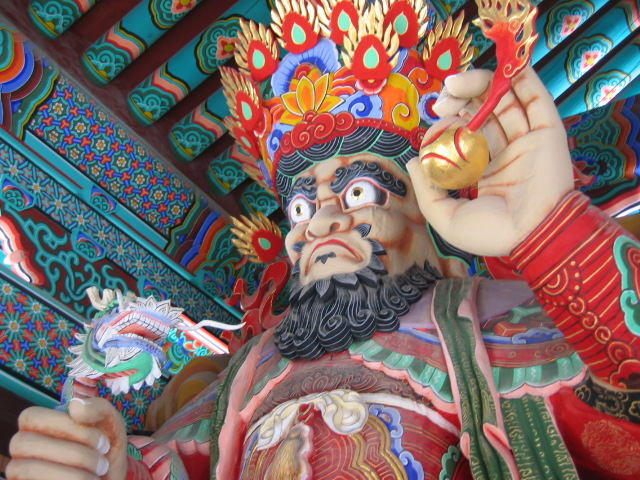
Korean statue of Gwangmok Cheonwang (Virūpākṣa)
