= Chitrangada =

Chitrangada can refer to the following people in Hindu epics:

- Chitrāngada, a son of Shantanu, king of Kuru
- Chitrāngada, father of Bhanumati (wife of Duryodhana)
- Chitrāngadā, a wife of Arjuna
- Chitrāngadā, a daughter of Vishwakarma
- Chitrāngada (Gandharva), king of the Gandharvas

== People ==
- Chitrangada Mori, Indian ruler
- Chitrangada Satarupa, India actress
- Chitrangada Singh, Indian actress
- Chitrangada Singh (princess), India

== Other ==
- Chitrangada (play), a dance-drama by Rabindranath Tagore, one of the Rabindra Nritya Natya
- Chitrangada: The Crowning Wish, a 2012 Indian Bengali-language film by Rituparno Ghosh
- Chitrangada (film), a 2017 Indian Telugu-language film
