= List of Gandharvas =

Below is a list of Gandharvas, a group of celestial musicians in Hinduism, Buddhism, and Jainism. They are often associated with music, accompany the higher gods, and are upholders of Dharma.

Gandharvas are male while Gandharvīs or Gandharva Kanyā are female.

Religious traditions that feature these entries are sorted using the following key:

- ॐ - Hinduism
- ☸ - Buddhism
- 卐 - Jainism

== Types ==
- Aśvataras - A class of Gandharva ॐ
- Mauneyas - A class of Gandharva born from Muni ॐ
- Rohitas - A class of Gandharva ॐ
- Śailūṣas - A class of Gandharva ॐ
- Uccaiśrvas - A class of Gandharva and Vājin born of Bhadrā, daughter Rohiṇī ॐ
- Vāleyas - A class of Gandharva born from Vikrānta ॐ

== List in alphabetical order ==
=== A ===
- Abhinamitā - ♀ ☸
- Āgamanagamanā (往來) - ♀ ☸
- Agniprabhā (火光) - ♀ ☸
- Alaṃkārabhūṣita (莊嚴) - A Gandharva King ☸
- Anādarśakā (無見) - ♀ ☸
- Arkkaparṇa - ॐ
- Audumbarā or Audumvararudita (青蓮華) - ♀ ☸

=== B ===
- Bhānu - Of which there are two ॐ
- Bhīmasena - ॐ
- Bhūtavādika - 卐
- Brahmacāri - Of which there are two ॐ
- Bṛhatva - ॐ

=== C ===
- Candrabimbaprabhā (月光) - ♀ ☸
- Citrāṅgada - ॐ
- Citraratha - A Gandharva King ॐ
- Citrasena - A Gandharva King and among the Yaksha chiefs in Buddhist literature ॐ☸

=== D ===
- Dānaṃdadā (惠施) - ♀ ☸
- Devavacanā or Devavaralocana (天語言) - ♀ ☸
- Dharmakāṅkṣiṇī (法愛) - ♀ ☸
- Dharmaṃdadā (法施) - ♀ ☸
- Dharmapriya (法樂) - A Gandharva King ☸
- Dhṛtarāṣṭra (持國) - A Gandharva King ॐ and one of the Four Great Kings ☸
- Dramila - A Gandharva King ॐ
- Draviḍa - ॐ
- Dundubhi (鼓音) - ♀ ☸
- Dundubhisvara (鼓音) - A Gandharva King ☸
- Dveṣaparimuktā (瞋解脱) - ♀ ☸

=== G ===
- Gītarasa - 卐
- Gītarati - A Gandharva Lord 卐
- Gītayaśas - A Gandharva Lord 卐
- Goman - ॐ

=== H ===
- Haṃsa - ॐ
- Hāhā - ॐ卐
- Huhū - ॐ卐

=== I ===
- Indramaghaśrī - ♀ ☸
- Indraśrī (帝釋樂) - ♀ ☸

=== J ===
- Janesabha - Also a Yaksha chief and thought to be synonymous with Janavasabha ☸
- Jvalantaśikharā (焔峯) - ♀ ☸

=== K ===
- Kadamba - 卐
- Kali - ॐ
- Kṣāntipriyā (愛忍辱) - ♀ ☸
- Kumudapuṣpā (炬母那花) - ♀ ☸
- Kumāradarśana (現童子身) - A Gandharva King ☸

=== M ===
- Madhura (美) - A Gandharva King (Lotus Sutra) ☸
- Madhurasvara (美音) - A Gandharva King (Lotus Sutra) ☸
- Mahākadamba - 卐
- Mahāsvara - 卐
- Mātali - Indra's charioteer and among the Yaksha chiefs in Buddhist literature ॐ☸
- Mohaparimuktā (癡解脱) - ♀ ☸
- Manojña (樂) - A Gandharva King (Lotus Sutra) ☸
- Manojñasvara (妙聲 or 樂音) - A Gandharva King (Lotus Sutra) ☸
- Manoramā (妙意) - ♀ ☸
- Mṛgarājinī (鹿王) - ♀ ☸
- Muditapuṣpā - ♀ ☸
- Mukulitā (花敷) - ♀ ☸

=== N ===
- Nala - Also a Yaksha chief ☸
- Nārada (那羅達) - A Gandharva King ☸卐
- Nirnāditabhūrya (種種樂音) - A Gandharva King ☸
- Nirvāṇapriyā (樂眞寂) - ♀ ☸

=== O ===
- Opamañña (Pali) - Also a Yaksha chief ☸

=== P ===
- Padmālaṃkārā or Padmālaṃbā (大蓮華) - ♀ ☸
- Padmaśriyā (蓮華吉祥) - ♀ ☸
- Padmāvatī - ♀ ☸
- Pana - ॐ
- Panāda - Also Yaksha chief ☸
- Pañcaśikha - ☸
- Pariśobhitakāyā (體清淨) - ♀ ☸
- Parjanya - ॐ☸
- Patravān - ॐ
- Phalaṃdadā (施果) - ♀ ☸
- Prajāpatinivāsinī (世主眷屬) - ♀ ☸
- Prayuta - ॐ
- Pṛthivīṃdadā (施地) - ♀ ☸
- Priyamukhā (愛面) - ♀ ☸
- Priyaṃdadā (愛施) - ♀ ☸
- Pūrṇa - Of which there are two ॐ
- Pūrṇāyus - ॐ

=== R ===
- Rāgaparimuktā (貪解脱) - ♀ ☸
- Raivata - 卐
- Rājaśrī (吉祥王) - ♀ ☸
- Ratiguṇa - ॐ
- Ratnamālā (寶鬘) - ♀ ☸
- Ratnāṅkurā (寶牙) - ♀ ☸
- Ratnapīṭhā (寶座) - ♀ ☸
- Ṛṣivādika - 卐

=== S ===
- Sahāpati or ‘’Sahāṃpati‘’ (天主) - A Gandharva King
- Sahasrabhuja (千臂) - A Gandharva King ☸
- Śailūṣa - ॐ
- Śakra - Indra. Though not a Gandharva proper, Buddhist literature has referred to him as a “Gandharva King” ☸
- Śālaśiras - ॐ
- Śarīraprahlādana (身歡喜) - A Gandharva King ☸
- Śataguṇa - ॐ
- Śatākārā (百手) - ♀ ☸
- Śatapuṣpā (百花) - ♀ ☸
- Satvana - ॐ
- Siddha - Of which there are two ॐ
- Siṃhagāminī (師子歩) - ♀ ☸
- Sphurantaśrī (變化吉祥) - ♀ ☸
- Subāhu - A Gandharva King in Kailāsa ॐ
- Subāhu - Son of Krodhā ॐ
- Subāhuyukta (妙臂) - A Gandharva King ☸
- Śubhamālā (妙莊嚴) - ♀ ☸
- Sucandra - ॐ
- Sujanaparivārā (善知識眷屬) - ♀ ☸
- Sukukṣi (妙腹) - ♀ ☸
- Sumālinī (妙鬘) - ♀ ☸
- Sunda - ॐ
- Supāṇḍu - ॐ
- Suparṇa - Of which there are several ॐ
- Sūryalocanā (遍照眼) - ♀ ☸
- Sūryavarcas - ॐ
- Suvarṇa - ॐ
- Suvarṇāvabhāsā or Suvaca (金耀) - ♀ ☸

=== T ===
- Taraṇya - ॐ
- Tumbara - Another name for Tumbura ॐ☸卐
- Tumburu - Another name for Tumbara ॐ☸卐

=== U ===
- Ugrasena - ॐ
- Upabarhaṇa - ॐ
- Ūrṇāyu - Of which there are two ॐ

=== V ===
- Vajramālā (金剛鬘) - ♀ ☸
- Vajravān - 卐
- Vajraśrī (妙吉祥) - ♀ ☸
- Vanaspati (樹林) - ♀ ☸
- Varuṇa) - ॐ
- Vāsava - 卐
- Vahvī - ॐ
- Vibhūṣitālaṃkārā (豐禮) - ♀ ☸
- Vilāsendragāminī (自在行) - ♀ ☸
- Virādha - Tumburu cursed to be reborn as a Rākṣasa ॐ
- Viśvāvasu - A Gandharva King ॐ卐

=== Misc ===
- (樂善知識; [Sanskrit name unknown]) - ♀ ☸
