= Vazhappully Temple =

Hindu temple

Vazhappully temple
- Vazhappully Shree Rajarajeshwari Temple
- Vazhappully Rajarajeswari Temple, Kazhimbram, Thrissur, Kerala

Religion
- Affiliation: Hinduism
- District: Thrissur
- Deity: Raja Rajeswari
- Festival: Makarappathu Maholsavam

Location
- Location: Kazhimbram near Valapad
- State: Kerala
- Country: India
- Interactive map of Vazhappully temple
- Coordinates: 10.368075°N 76.112005°E

Architecture
- Type: Architecture of Kerala

Specifications
- Temple: One
- Elevation: 28.52 m (94 ft)

Vazhappully Shree Rajarajeshwari temple is a Hindu temple located at Kazhimbram near Valapad in Thrissur District. This is one of the few family temples in Kerala worshipping Gandharva.
