= Gandharva =

Celestial musicians in Hinduism

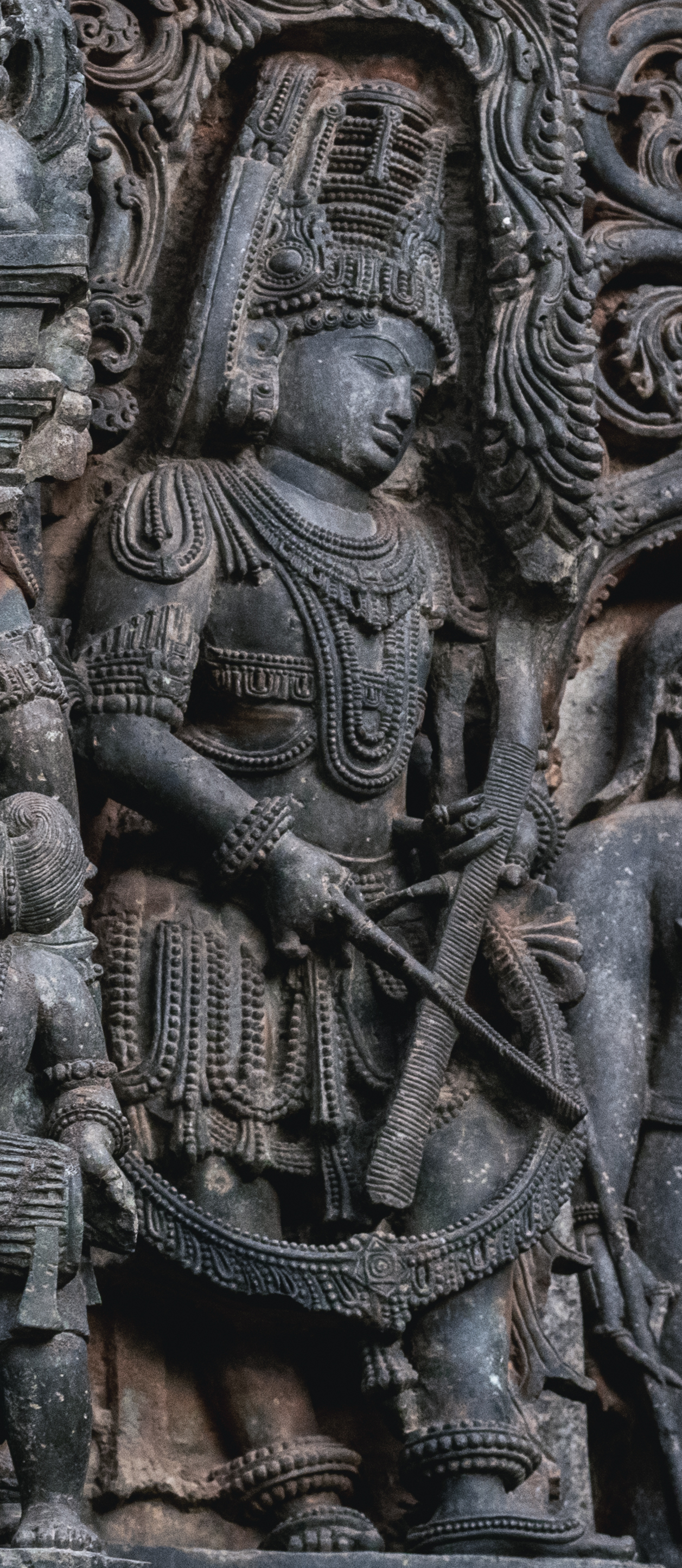
A Gandharva playing a Naga veena, sculpture at the12th-century Hoysaleswara Temple, Karnataka.

A gandharva (Sanskrit: गन्धर्व) is a member of a class of celestial beings in Indian religions, such as Hinduism, Buddhism, and Jainism, whose males are divine performers such as musicians and singers, and the females are divine dancers. In Hinduism, they are regarded to be the celestial demigods who serve as the musicians of the devas.

It is also a term for skilled singers in Indian classical music. In Buddhism, this term also refers to a being in the intermediate state (between death and rebirth).

== In Hinduism ==
In Hinduism, the gandharvas (Sanskrit: गन्धर्व, romanized: gandharva) are a class of minor deities who serve as divine musicians in Hindu mythology.

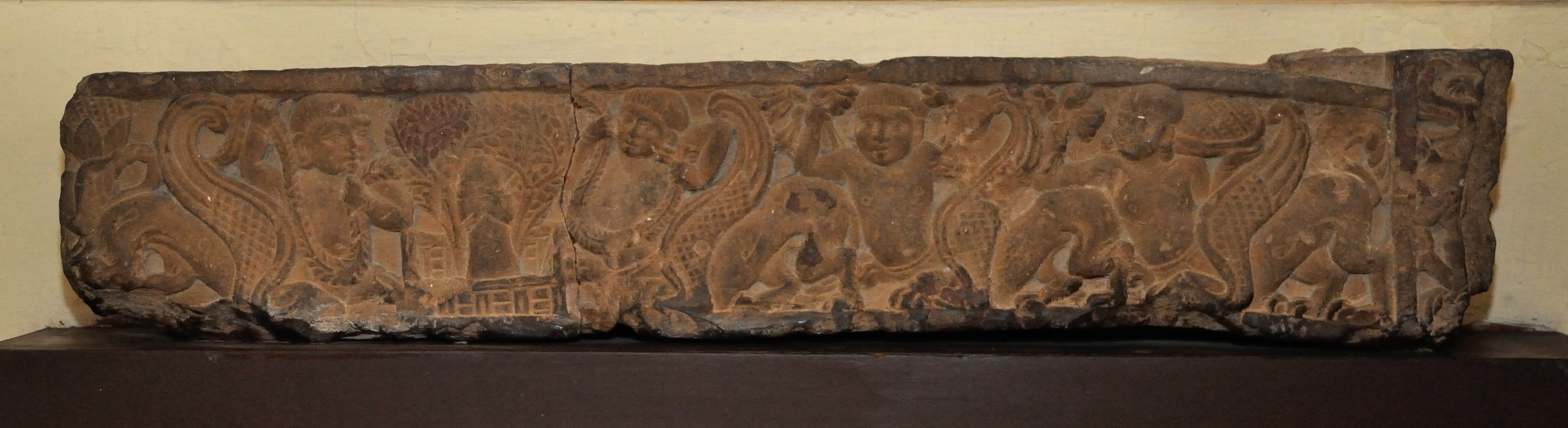
Lingam inside a railing (left), being worshipped by gandharvas winged creatures. Art of Mathura, circa 100 BCE.

The term gandharva is present in Vedic sources (including in the Rigveda) as a singular deity. According to Oberlies, "In mandala I, IX and X the gandharva is presented as a celestial being (dwelling near the Sun / in the heavenly waters) which watches over the Soma (apparently) for the benefit of the gods and the sacrificers." The gandharva also "receives the Soma from the ‘Daughter of the Sun' to put it into the Soma plant (RV 9.113.3), i.e., to bring it to this world." The gandharva also brings other things from the beyond, including humans (RV 10.10.4) and the horse (RV 1.163.2). As such, the function of the gandharva is "to escort things from ‘outside' into this world thereby divesting them of their (potential) dangerous nature." Later, the figure also came to be associated with fertility and virility.

The Atharvaveda mentions 6,333 gandharvas. They are generally the husbands of apsaras. They are described as handsome beings who wear fragrant attire and are passionate about women. Some are part animal, usually a bird or horse. They have exceptional musical skills. They guard the sacred Soma drink, and play beautiful music for the devas in their palaces. Gandharvas usually live in Svarga and serve at Indra's court, though they also have their own realm, called the Gandharvaloka. Female gandharvas are called gandharvis.

In Hindu law, a gandharva marriage is one contracted by mutual consent and without formal rituals.

Gandharvas are mentioned extensively in the epic Mahabharata as associated with the devas (as dancers and singers) and with the yakshas, as formidable warriors. They are mentioned as spread across various territories.

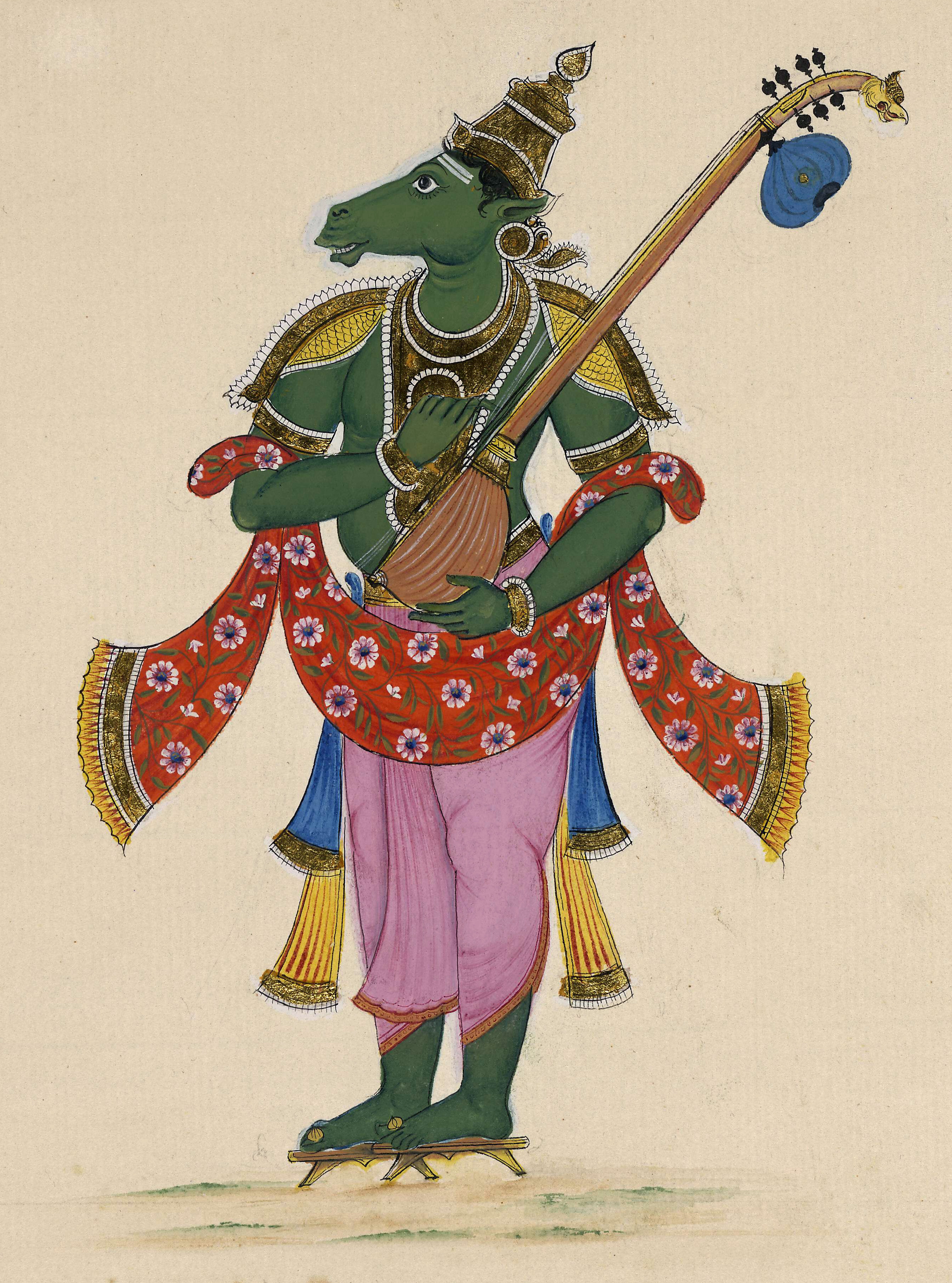
The horse-head Tumburu or Tumbara is described as best among gandharvas in Hinduism

Some of the most prominent gandharvas include Tumburu, Visvavasu (who was the father of Pramadvara), Chitrangada (who killed Chitrangada, the son of Shantanu and Satyavati), Chitrasena (with whom the Kauravas and Pandavas fought in the Ghosha-yatra), Drumila (the biological father of Kamsa in some texts), and Chandavega (king of the Gandharvas who invaded the city of Purañjana).

=== Parentage ===
Various parentage is given for the gandharvas. They are called the creatures of Prajapati, of Brahma, of Kashyapa and Pradha, of the Munis, of Arishta, or of Vāc.

The Bhagavata Purana mentions that when Brahma, during creation, saw the activities of some sexually active asuras, he laughed. From his laughter were produced the gandharvas.

=== Worship ===
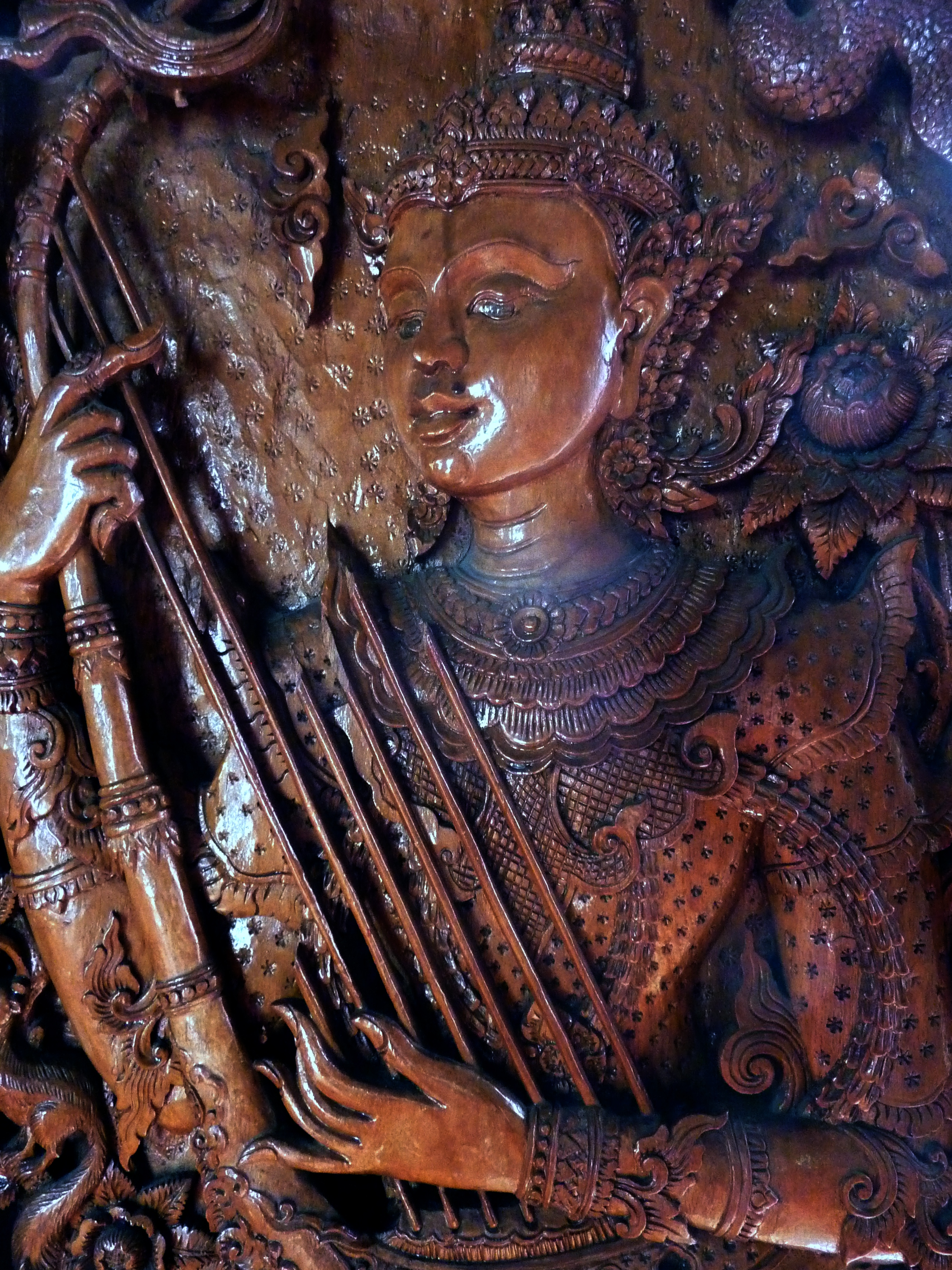
Wood carving of a gandharva, Thailand

Hindu worship of Gandharvas is extremely rare across India and is mostly seen in the southern state of Kerala. In the state, Gandharvas are enshrined in temples, sometimes along with Yakshi and prayed to for fertility and good fortune. It believed that earning the ire of the Gandharvas will result in Gandharva dosha, a curse which will have adverse effect on those who are cursed, especially in terms of fertility and childbirth. In addition, Kerala also has the tradition of Gandharvanpattu, a type of theyyam and kalampattu ritual meant to invoke the Gandharvas.

Some temples in Kerala where Gandharvas are enshrined as deities are:

- Vazhapully Sree Rajarajeswari Temple
- Sree Aiswarya Gandharva Swami Temple, Urulikunnam, Chengalam
- Andoor Sree Gandharvaswami Temple, Elackad
- Sree Vaishnava Gandharva Swamy Temple, Champakkara
- Gandharva Swamy Temple, Kothala
- Gandharva Temple, Thalayazham
- Maniyassery Vaishnava Gandharva Swamy Temple, Maravanthuruthu
- Kunnamthanam Thuranganattu Aiswarya Gandharva Swamy Temple, Pathanamthitta
- Sree Yakshi-Gandharva Swamy Temple, Paravanthuruthu, Kallara
- Kaduvinath Gandharva Temple, Bharanikkavu, Alappuzha
- Oorikattil Sree Gandharva Swamy Temple, Kottayam
- Mullethu Gandharva Swamy Temple, Chandiroor, Alappuzha
- Marthandamparambu Gandharva Temple, Pazhaveedu, Alappuzha
- Sree Ponnumpoomala Gandharva Temple, Parudur
- Vaikkathusseril Sree Gandharva Nagaraja Bhadrakali Temple, Kumarakom

== In Buddhism ==
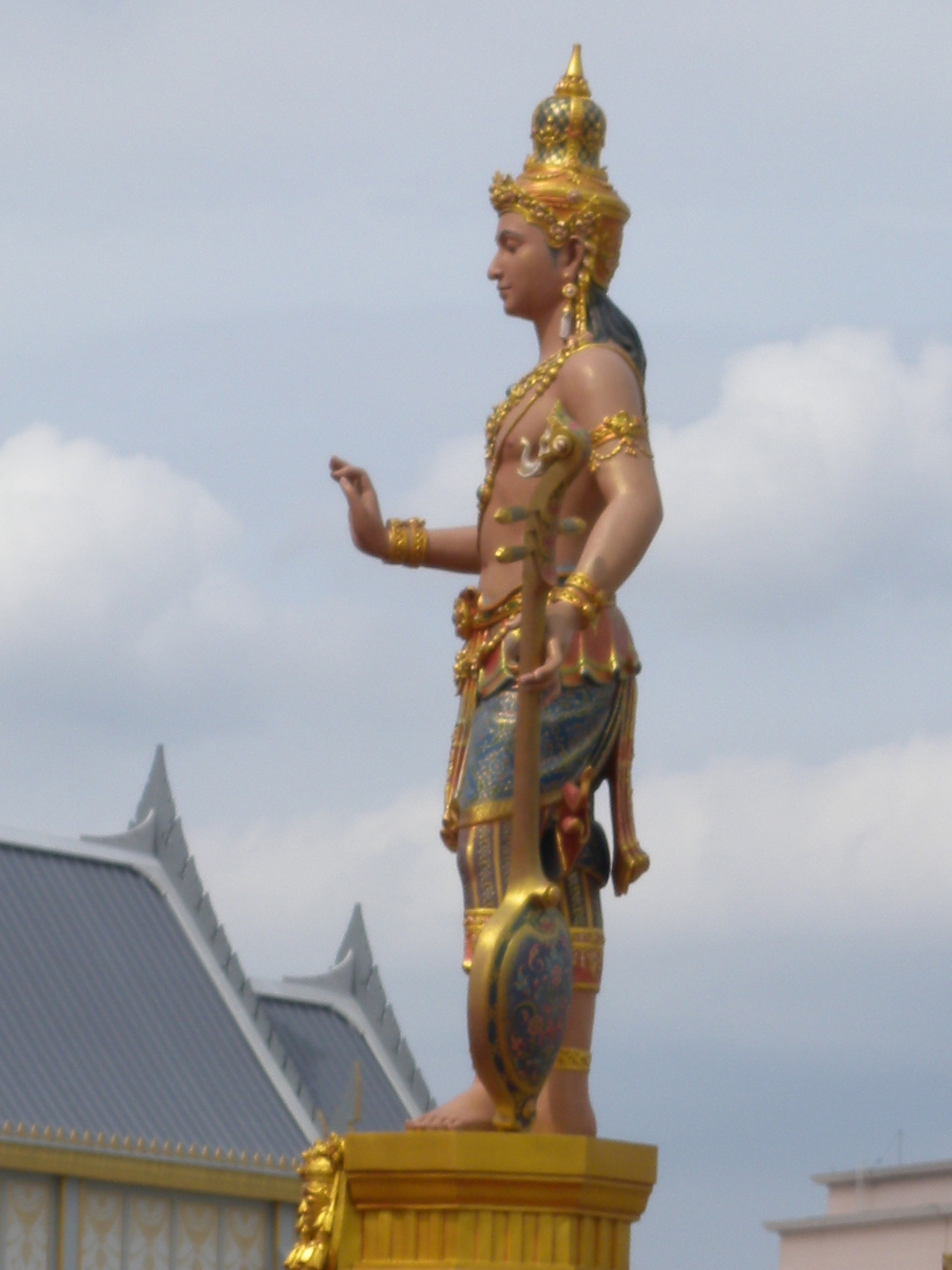
Dhṛtarāṣṭra, one of the Four Heavenly Kings and the king of the gandharvas.

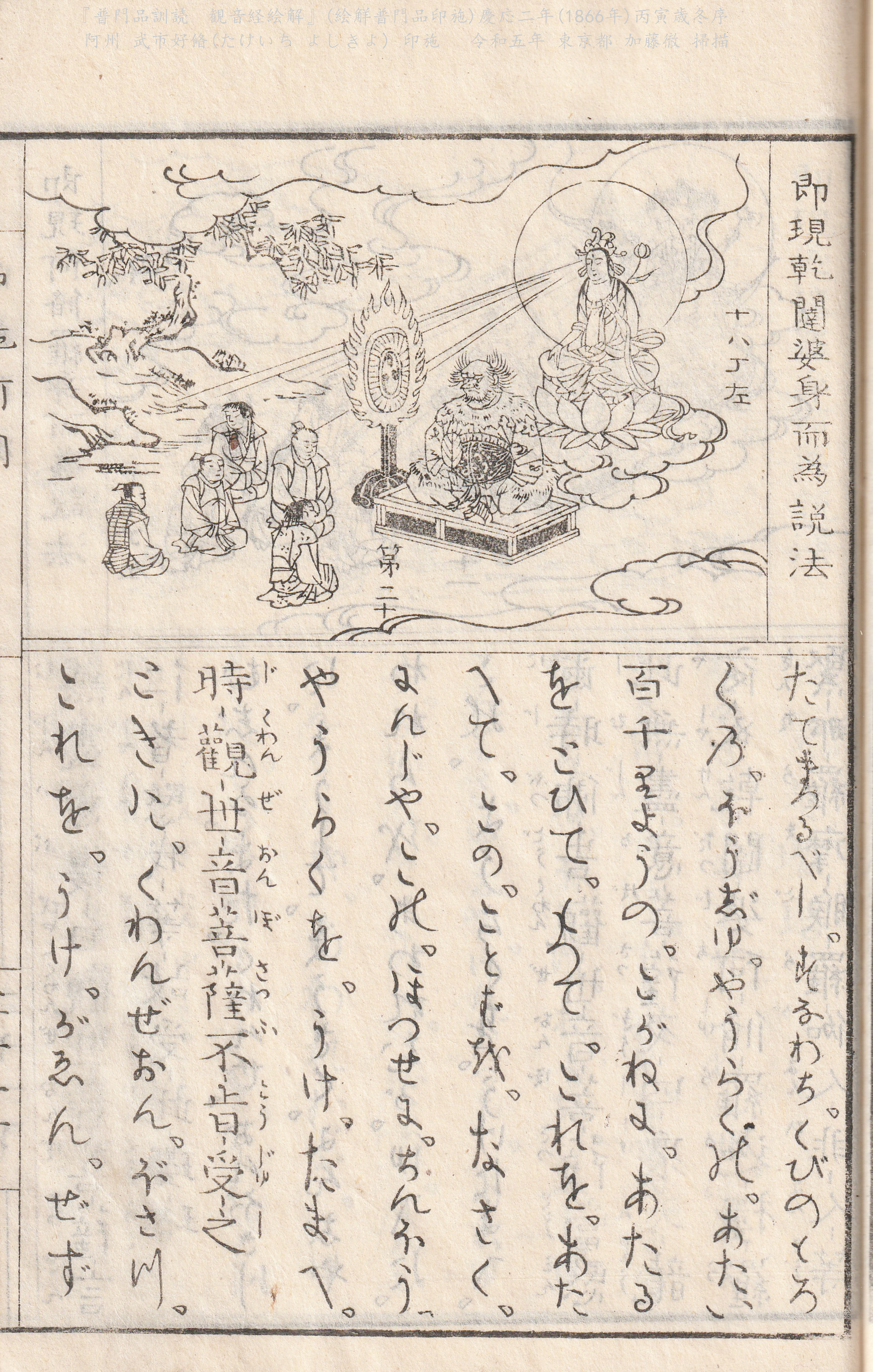
An illustration from an 1866 Japanese book. Gandharva, who is an incarnation of Bodhisattva Kannon in this scene, gives a sermon to folks.

A gandharva is one of the lowest-ranking Devas in Buddhist cosmology. They are classed among the Cāturmahārājakāyika Devas, and are subject to the Great King Dhṛtarāṣṭra, Guardian of the East. Beings are reborn among the gandharvas as a consequence of having practiced the most basic form of ethics (Janavasabha Sutta, DN.18). Gandharvas can fly through the air, and are known for their skill as musicians. They are connected with trees and flowers, and are described as dwelling in the scents of bark, sap, and blossoms. They are among the beings of the wilderness that might disturb a monk meditating alone.

The terms gandharva and yakṣa sometimes refer to the same entity. Yakṣa in these cases is the more general term, including a variety of lower deities.

=== Intermediate Rebirth ===
In the Mahātaṇhāsankhaya Sutta of the Majjhima Nikāya, the Buddha explains to the bhikkhus that an embryo develops when three conditions are met: the woman must be in the correct point of her menstrual cycle, the woman and man must have sexual intercourse, and a gandhabba must be present. According to the commentary of this sutta, the use of the word gandhabba doesn't refer to a celestial Deva, but a being enabled to be born by its karma. It is the state of a sentient being between rebirths.

=== Notable gandharvas ===
Among the notable gandharvas mentioned (in DN.20 and DN.32) are Panāda, Opamañña, Nala, Cittasena, Mātali, and Janesabha. The last in this list is thought to be synonymous with Janavasabha, a rebirth of King Bimbisāra of Magadha. Mātali is the charioteer of Śakra.

Timbarū is a chieftain of the gandharvas. There is a romantic story told about the love between his daughter Bhaddā Suriyavacchasā (Sanskrit: Bhadrā Sūryavarcasā) and another gandharva, Pañcasikha (Sanskrit: Pañcaśikha). Pañcasikha fell in love with Suriyavacchasā when he saw her dancing before Śakra, but she was then in love with Mātali's son Sikhandī (or Sikhaddi). Pañcasikha went to Timbarū's home and played a melody on his flute of beluva-wood, with which he had great skill, and sang a love song in which he interwove themes about the Buddha and the Arhats.

Śakra petitioned Pañcasikha to intercede with the Buddha so that he might have an audience with him. As a reward for Pañcasikha's services, Śakra was able to get Suriyavacchasā, already pleased with Pañcasikha's display of skill and devotion, to agree to marry Pañcasikha.

Pañcasikha also acts as a messenger for the Four Heavenly Kings, conveying news from them to Mātali, the latter representing Śakra and the Trāyastriṃśa Devas.

== In Jainism ==
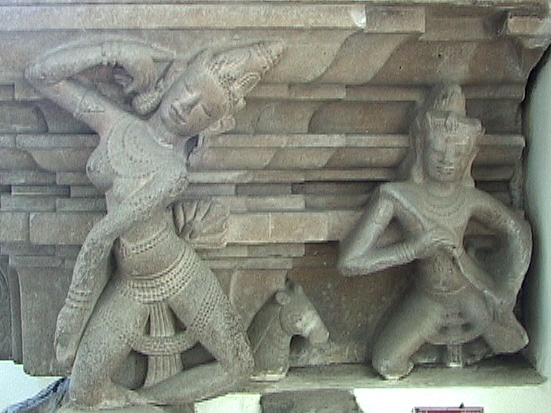
Gandharva (right) with an Apsara, 10th century, Cham, Vietnam

In Jainism, gandharvas are classed among the eight Vyantara Devas.

The Tiloyapaṇṇatti provides a list of ten gandharvas:

- Hāhā
- Huhū
- Nārada
- Tumbara
- Vāsava
- Kadamba
- Mahāsvara
- Gītarati
- Gītarasa
- Vajravān

The Saṃgrahaṇī Sūtra of the Śvetāmbara sect provides a slightly different list:

- Hāhā
- Huhū
- Tumburu
- Nārada
- Ṛṣivādika
- Bhūtavādika
- Kadamba
- Mahākadamba
- Raivata
- Viśvāvasu
- Gītarati
- Gītayaśas

The Digambara sect describes the gandharvas as having a golden complexion while the Śvetāmbara tradition recognizes them as blackish. The Tumbaru is their sacred tree.

== See also ==
- List of gandharvas
- Chitrasena
- Gandharva marriage
- Kabandha
- Sylph
- Tumburu
