= Chitrāngada (Gandharva) =

Celestial king of the Gandharvas

Chitrāngada, as mentioned in Hindu texts such as the Mahabharata, was the celestial king of the Gandharvas. The king of the Kuru Kingdom Chitrangada was named after him. The Kuru king, after subjugating various kings on earth, proceeded to challenge the king of the Gandharvas. The two kings fought along the banks of the Hiranyavati river, near modern-day Ujjain. After three days of intense fighting, the king of the Gandharvas slayed the King of the Kurus, then returned to his heavenly abode.
