= Gandharvanpattu =

Ritual artform from North Kerala, India

Gandharvanpattu is a ritual artform in North Kerala. This ritual is mainly performed by Vannan. There is five theyyams called Rudhirakkali, Varavakkali, Devathe, Mekkkaruvaal, Gandharvan in gandharvanpattu. This ritual is performed for the blessing of bhootam. The ritual is performed in the style of kalam pattu in Kavu. In past times this artform is performed on the houses where pregnant women live to eliminate different kinds of badha(ghost). Pulluvaveena and Pulluvakkudam are also used in Gandharvan Pattu.

In 2017 this artform is performed again in stage.

This art is also known as Kenthran Pattu
