= Chitrangada (play) =

Dance-drama by Rabindranath Tagore

- Title page of a Bengali version by Visvabharati
- Author: Rabindranath Tagore
- Language: Bengali
- Genre: Dance drama
- Published: 1892
- Publication place: British India

Published in 1892, Chitrangada is a dance-drama, i.e. a Nritya-Nāṭya (Bengali: নৃত্যনাট্য) written by Rabindranath Tagore. The drama is based on the story of Chitrāngadā (IAST: Citrāṅgadā), the mythological princess of the Kingdom of Manipur and one of the wives of Arjuna according to the Mahabharata.
