= Kazhimbram =

Village in India

Kazhimbram is a coastal village in Thrissur district, Kerala, India. It had a population of 7,737 at the 1981 census.

== Government and geography ==
Kazhimbram is the shoreline settlement associated with the village of Edamuttam, which lies inland. Kazhimbram and Edamuttam share the Postal Index Number 680568. Kazhimbram beach has no sea wall and has suffered from severe coastal erosion. As of 2004 it was observed to be a nesting site for turtles, although people were known to dig up the eggs.

Kazhimbram is located south of Valapad village and within Valapad Grama Panchayat. In the 2015 election Kazhimbram elected a member from the Communist Party of India (Marxist) to the Grama Panchayat standing committee. It is in the Block Panchayat of Thalikulam, to which in 2015 it elected an Indian National Congress member. It is part of the Taluk of Chavakkad.

== Education ==
Kazhimbram is the location of VPM SNDP Higher Secondary School, and also Pallipram FLPS, a state primary school.

== Religion ==
The Vazhappully Sree Rajarajeshwari temple is located in the village.
