= Pancasikha =

Celestial musician in Buddhist texts

Pañcaśikha
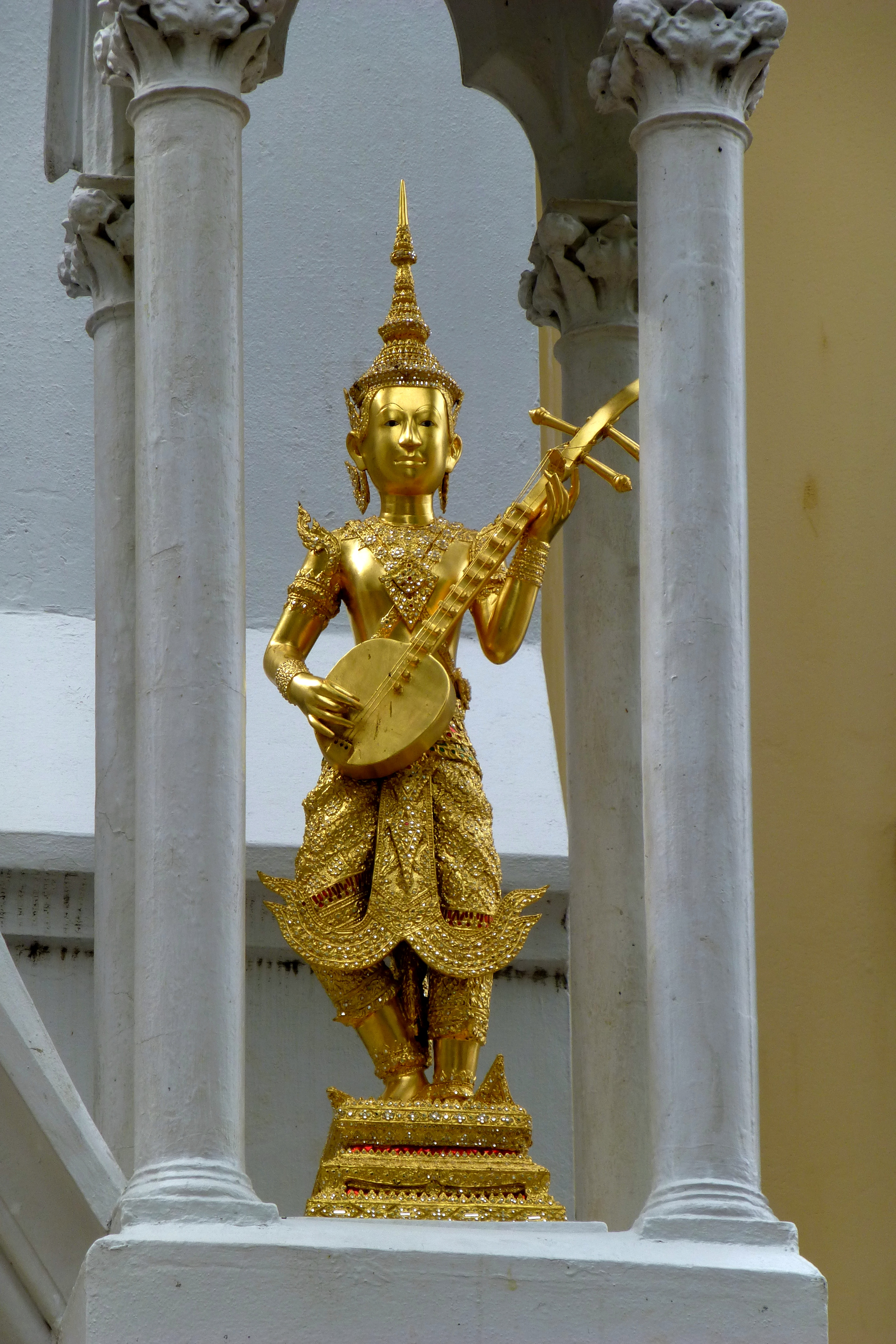
- The Statue of Deva Pañcaśikha playing Krachappi(Phin) in Thai art Rattanakosin Art period in Ubosot of Wat Niwet Thammaprawat located within the grounds of the Bang Pa-In Royal Palace Bang Pa-in district Phra Nakhon Si Ayutthaya Province Thailand.
- Sanskrit: पञ्चशिख; Pañcaśikha
- Pāli: पञ्चसिख; Pañcasikha
- Burmese: ပဉ္စသီခ; ပၪၥသိခ
- Chinese: 五結樂子; (Pinyin: Wǔjiélèzi); 波遮旬; (Pinyin: Bōzhēxún); 般遮翼; (Pinyin: Bānzhēyì); 五髻; (Pinyin: Wǔjì)
- Japanese: 五結楽子(ごけつがくし); (romaji: Goketsugakushi); 波遮旬(はしゃじゅん); (romaji: Hashajun); 般遮翼(はんしゃよく); (romaji: Hanshayoku); 五髻(ごけい); (romaji: Gokei)
- Korean: 오결락자; (RR: Ogyeollagja); 파차순; (RR: Pachasun); 반차익; (RR: Banchaig); 빤차시카; (RR: Ppanchasika)
- Thai: พระปัญจสิขะ; พระปัญจสิขร
- Tibetan: ཕུད་པུ་ལྔ།; Wylie: phud pu lnga; ཟུར་ཕུད་ལྔ་པ།; Wylie: zur phud lnga pa
- Vietnamese: Ngũ Kế

Pancasikha (Sanskrit: Pañcaśikha; Pali: Pañcasikha) is a gandharva in the Buddhist pantheon.

== Character ==
Pañcaśikha is the god who receives messages from the Four Heavenly Kings and their ministers regarding the deeds done in the human world. He would pass information on to Mātali, who in turn informed the king of Trāyastriṃśa, Śakra. He is also king among the gandharvas, a status granted by Śakra.

His lover is the female gandharva Bhadrā Sūryavarcasā (Sanskrit; Pali: Bhaddā Suriyavaccasā).

His favorite instrument is the Beluvapanduvīnā, a stringed instrument that originally belonged to Mara. In Mahayana sources, this is described as a lute made of beryl or lapis lazuli (Ch: 琉璃琴 or 瑠璃寶裝箜篌).

The Statue of Deva Pañcaśikha playing Krachappi(Phin) in Thai art Rattanakosin Art period (left) in Bangkok National Museum (right) and Cetiya(Stupa) of Wat Bowonniwet Vihara Bangkok.
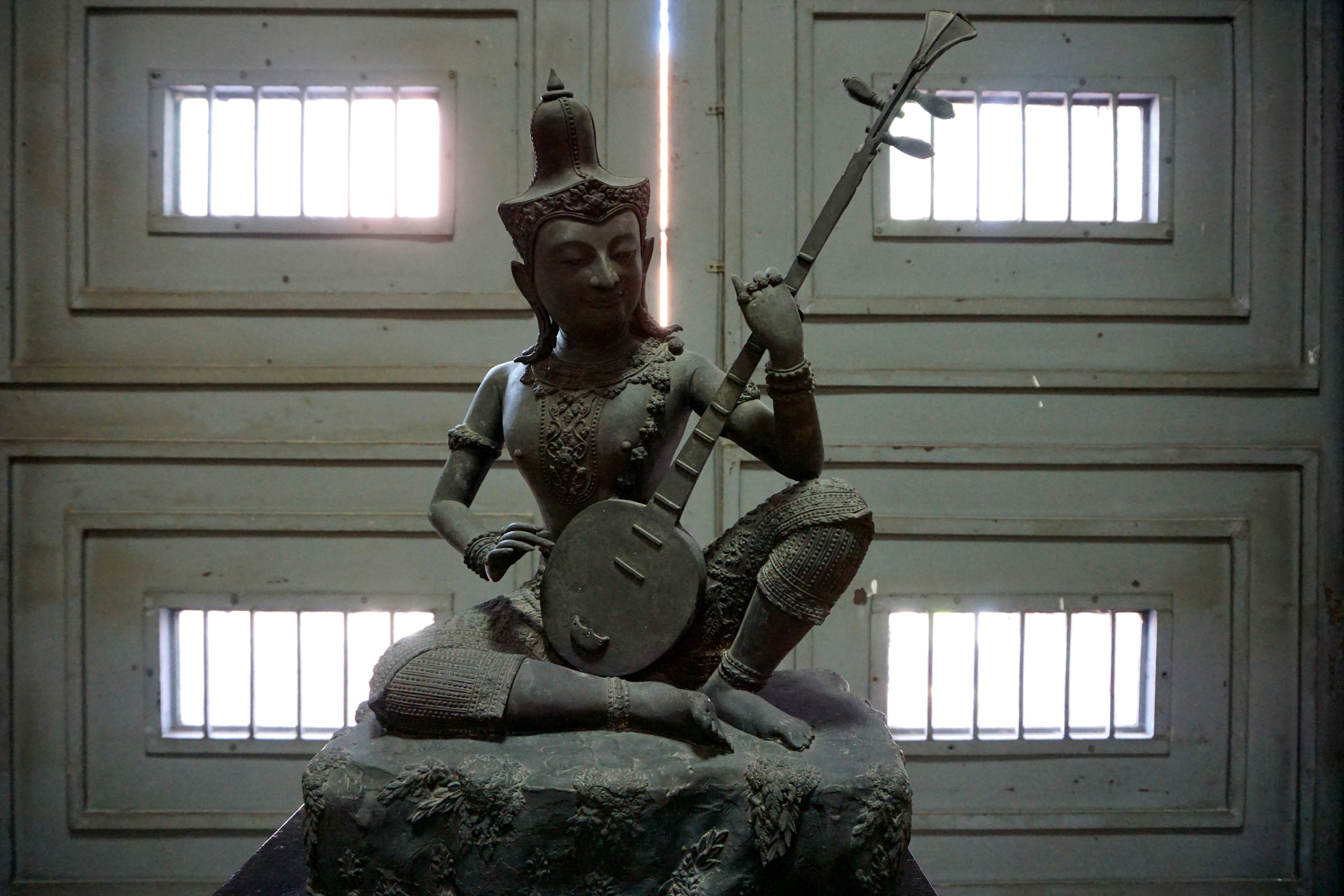
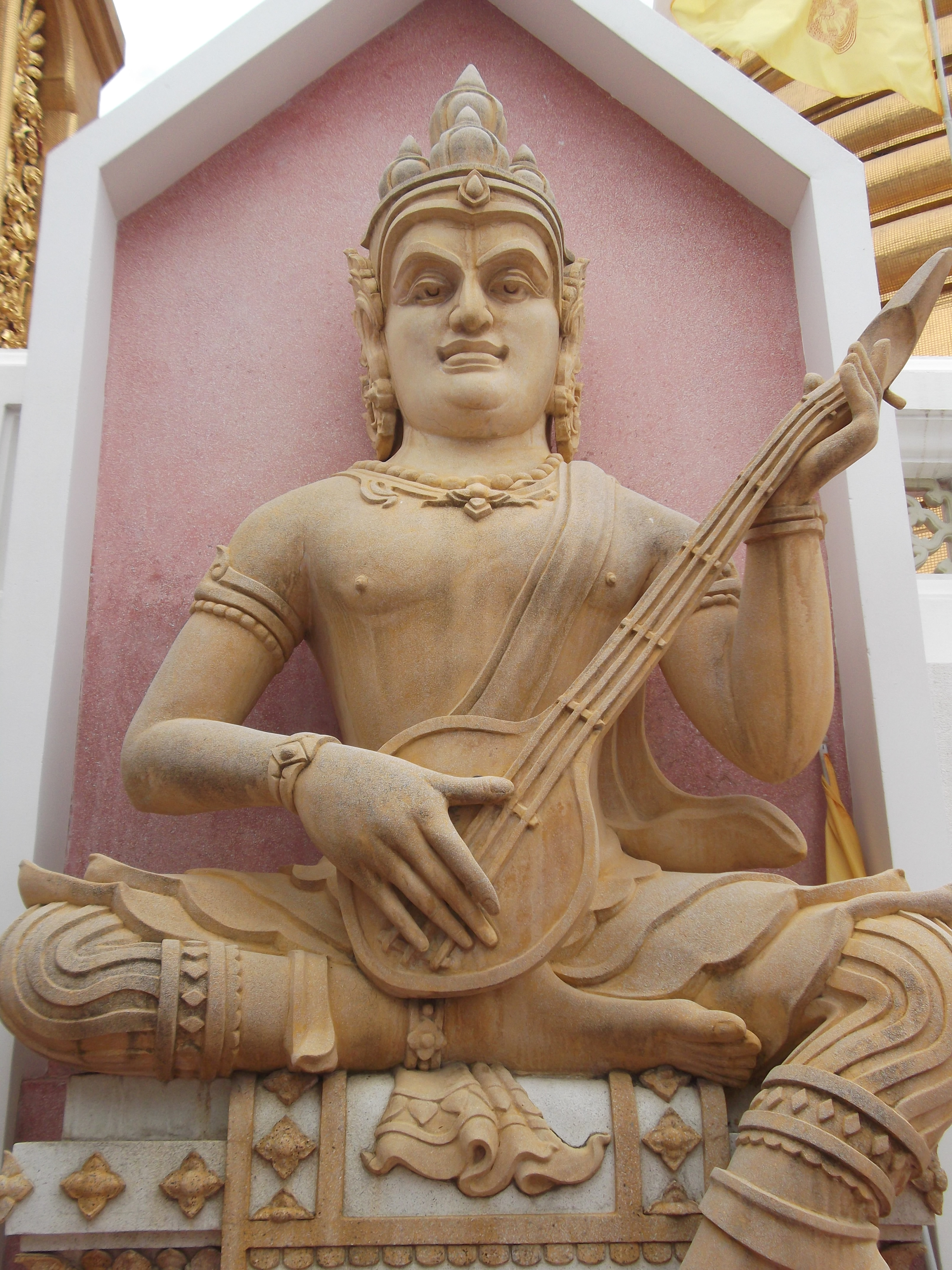

== Literature ==
=== Sakkapañha Sutta/Śakraparipṛcchā Sūtra ===
Pañcaśikha makes his most notable appearance in the Sutra of the Questions of Śakra; the Sakkapañha Sutta in the Pali Canon and the Śakraparipṛcchā Sūtra (帝釋所問經) in the Taishō Tripiṭaka; where his role as interlocutor becomes apparent.

Śakra, on wishing to see the Buddha appeared with a retinue of gods in the human world above Mount Vediyaka. The light created by their glory was noticed by the residents of the local village, who assumed that the mountain had caught on fire. Śakra persuaded Pañcaśikha to charm the Buddha out of his meditation in order to gain his attention. Pañcaśikha obliged and went to the cave in which the Buddha was staying. He addressed him with a song about the Three Jewels and romantic love.

==== Pañcaśikha’s Song ====
“My lady Suriyavaccasā, oh my Sunshine—
I pay homage to your father Timbaru,
through whom was born a lady so fine,
to fill me with a joy I never knew.

As sweet as a breeze to one who’s sweating,
or when thirsty, a sweet and cooling drink,
so dear is your shining beauty to me,
just like the teaching is to all the saints!

Like a cure when you’re struck by fever dire,
or food to ease the hunger pain,
come on, darling, please put out my fire,
quench me like water on a flame.

As elephants burning in the heat of summer,
sink down in a lotus pond to rest,
so cool, full of petals and of pollen—
that’s how I would plunge into your breast.

Like elephants bursting bonds in rutting season,
beating off the pricks of lance and pikes—
I just don’t understand what is the reason
I’m so crazy for your shapely thighs!

For you, my heart is full of passion,
I’m in an altered state of mind.
There is no going back, I’m just not able,
I’m like a fish that’s hooked up on the line.

Come on, my darling, hold me, fair of thighs!
Embrace me, with your so bashful eyes!
Take me in your arms, my lovely lady,
that’s all I’d ever want or could desire.

Ah, then my desire was such a small thing,
my sweet, with your curling wavy hair;
now, like to arahants an offering,
it’s grown so very much from there.

Whatever the merit I have forged
by giving to such perfected beings—
may that, my altogether gorgeous,
ripen in togetherness with you.

Whatever the merit I have forged
in this wide open land,
may that, my altogether gorgeous,
ripen in togetherness with you.

Absorbed, the Sakyan meditates,
unified, alert, and mindful,
the sage aims right at the deathless state—
like me, oh my Sunshine, aiming for you!

And just like the sage would be rejoicing,
were he to awaken to the truth,
so I’d be rejoicing, lady,
were I to end up as one with you.

If Sakka were to grant me just one wish,
as Lord of the holy Thirty-Three,
my darling, you’re the only one I’d wish for,
so strong is the love I hold for you.

Like a freshly blossoming sal tree
is your father, my lady so wise.
I pay homage to him, bowing down humbly,
to he whose daughter is of such a kind.”

==== The Buddha's response ====
The Buddha praised Pañcaśikha for his ability to harmonize his voice and instrument and asked him when he composed the song. Pañcaśikha relayed the story of when he fell in love with the goddess Bhaddā Suriyavaccasā shortly after the Buddha's enlightenment.

=== Other ===
Within Pali literature, Pañcaśikha is seen in the Pañcasikha Sutta where he visits the Buddha and asks him why some beings attain arhatship in their present lives while others do not. The Bilārakosiya Jātaka states that in a past life, Ananda held the office of Pañcaśikha.

He also appears in Sanskrit literature such as the Avadānaśataka. He is also counted among deities in Mahayana texts such as the Samādhirāja Sūtra, the Dānapāramitā Sūtra and the Pratītyasamutpāda Sūtra.

== See also ==
- Gandharva
- Hermes - a Greek god who shares some similarities with Pañcaśikha
