= Trāyastriṃśa =

Second in the six heavens in Buddhist cosmology

Translations of Trāyastriṃśa
- English: Heaven of the Thirty-Three
- Sanskrit: त्रायस्त्रिंश (IAST: trāyastriṃśa)
- Pali: tāvatiṁsa
- Burmese: တာဝတိံသာ (MLCTS: tàwədèɪɰ̃ðà)
- Chinese: 忉利天 (Pinyin: Dāolìtiān)
- Japanese: 忉利天 (Katakana: トウリテン) (Rōmaji: tōriten)
- Khmer: ត្រ័យត្រិង្ស (alt. ត្រៃត្រិង្ស) តាវត្តិង្ស (UNGEGN: traitrings tāvattings)
- Korean: 도리천 (Hanja: 忉利天) (RR: doricheon)
- Sinhala: තව්තිසාව (tavtisāva)
- Tagalog: Tasatimsa
- Tibetan: སུམ་ཅུ་རྩ་གསུམ་པ་ (Wylie: sum cu rtsa gsum pa THL: sumchu tsa sumpa)
- Thai: ดาวดึงส์
- Vietnamese: Đao Lợi Thiên (Chữ Nôm: 忉利天)

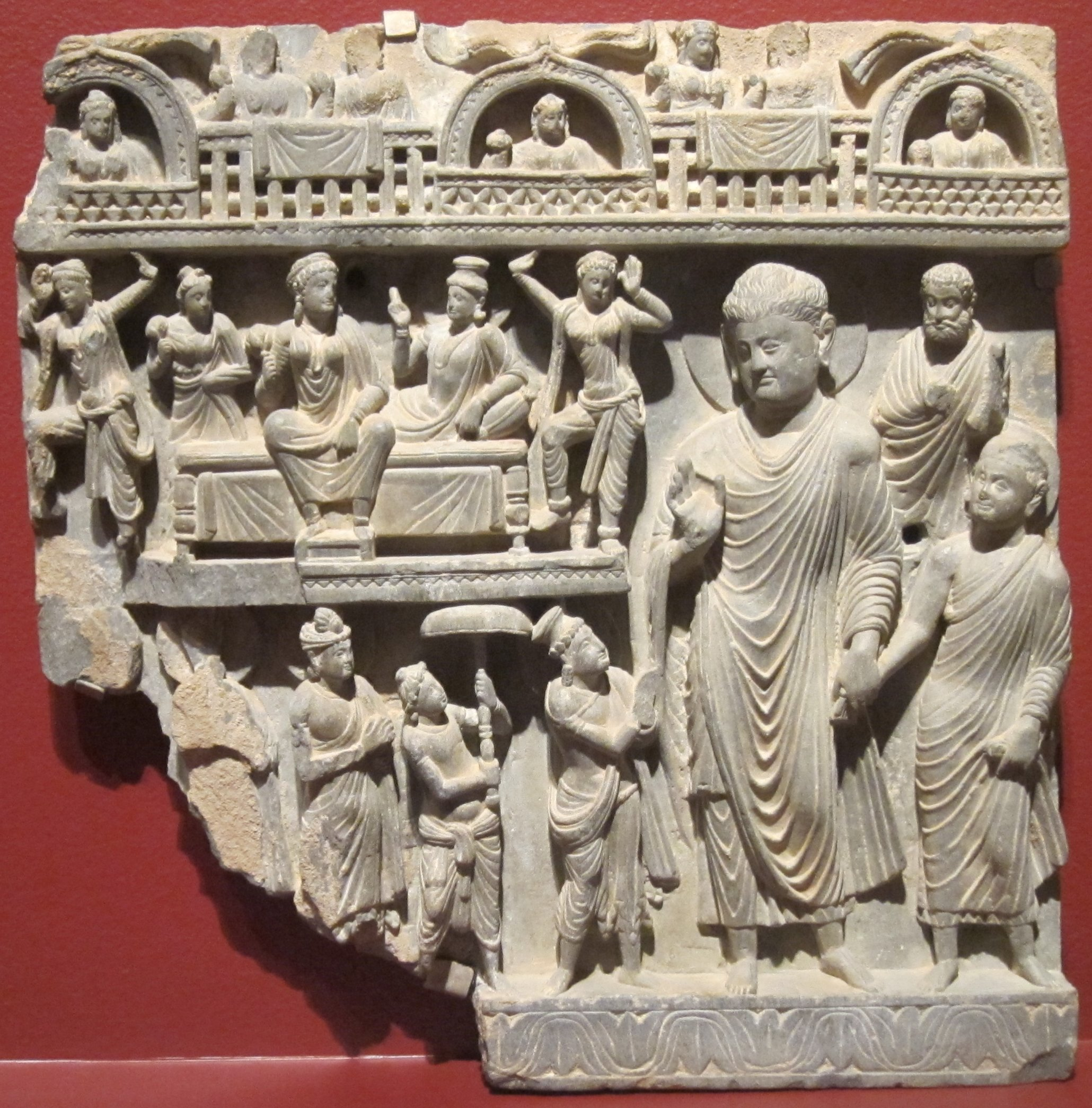
The Buddha and Nanda visit the divya apsaras in the Trāyastriṃśa heaven, Gandhāra (present-day Pakistan), schist, late 2nd century, San Diego Museum of Art

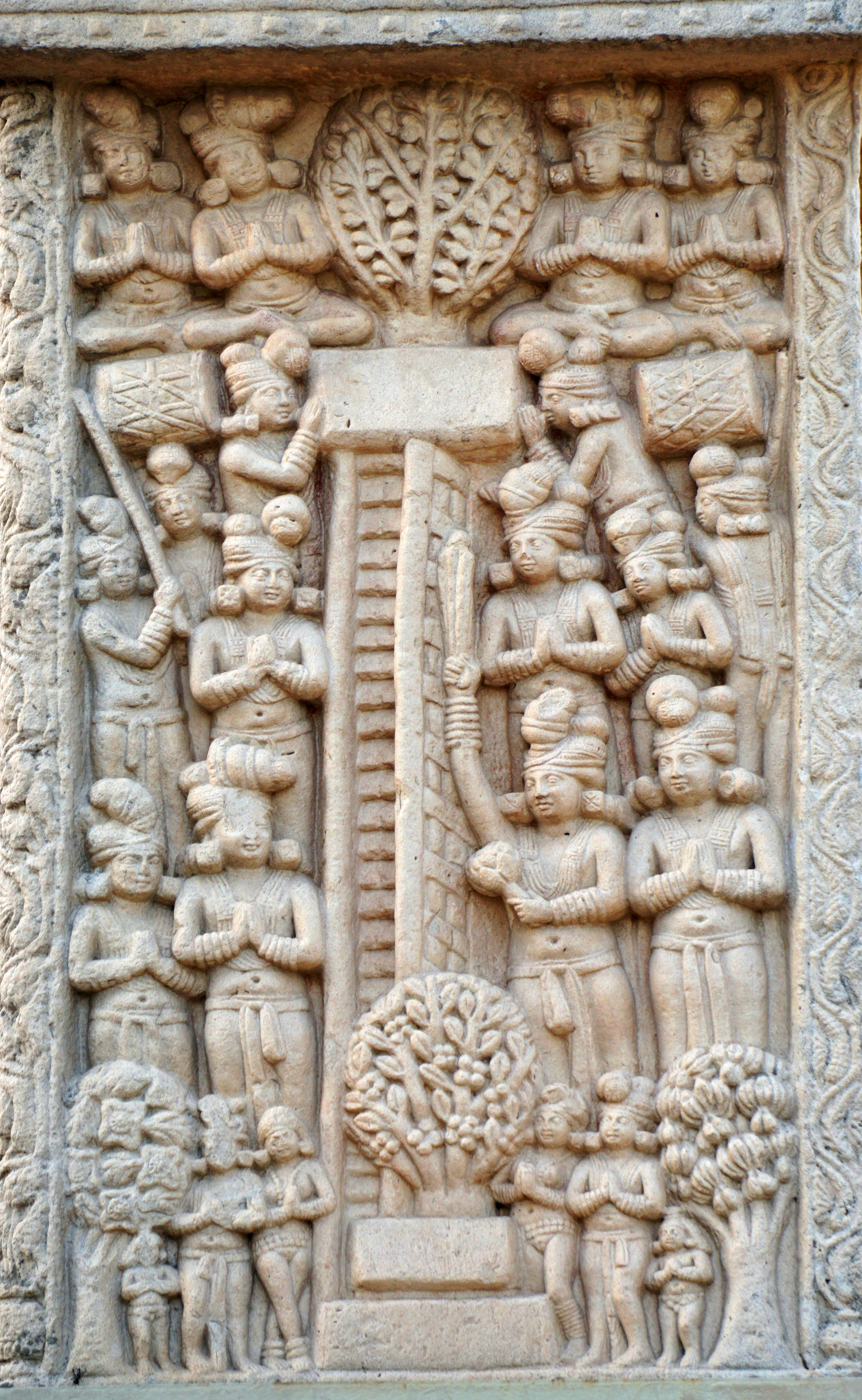
Descent of the Buddha from the Trāyastriṃśa heaven at Sankissa, Northern Gateway, Stupa No. 1, Sanchi

Trāyastriṃśa (Sanskrit: त्रायस्त्रिंश, pronounced [t̪ɾɑː.jɐs̪.t̪ɾĩ.ɕɐ], romanized: trāyastriṃśa; Pali: tāvatiṁsa; lit. 'of the thirty-three [heavenly beings]') is a celestial realm of the devas in Buddhist cosmology and constitutes the second of the six heavens of the desire realm (kāmadhātu). The term is a Sanskrit adjectival form derived from the numeral त्रयस्त्रिंशत् (trayastriṃśat), meaning "thirty-three", a reference to the pantheon of devas who preside over it, modeled after the thirty-three Vedic deities. It is ruled by Śakra.

== Description ==
The Trāyastriṃśa heaven is the second of the heavens of the Kāmadhātu, just above Catumaharajika or the realm of the Four Heavenly Kings, and is the highest of the heavens that maintains a physical connection with the rest of the world. Trāyastriṃśa is located on the peak of Sumeru, the central mountain of the world, at a height of 80 yojanas; the total area of the heaven is 80 yojanas square. This heaven is therefore comparable to the Greek Mount Olympus in some respects.

According to Vasubandhu, inhabitants of Trāyastriṃśa are each half a krośa tall (about 1500 feet) and live for 1000 years, of which each day is equivalent to 100 years of our world: that is, for a total of 36 million of our years.

Since Trāyastriṃśa is physically connected to the world through Sumeru, unlike the heavens above it, the Trāyastriṃśa devas are unable to avoid being entangled in worldly affairs. In particular, they frequently find themselves in quarrels with the asuras, a separate set of divine beings who were expelled from Trāyastriṃśa and who now dwell at the foot of Sumeru, plotting for ways to recover their lost kingdom. There is, however, marriage between the devas and the asuras just as there is between the Æsir and the jötnar in Norse mythology.

The chief of the Trāyastriṃśa devas is Śakra (Pāli: Sakka), also known as Indra. Other Trāyastriṃśa devas who are frequently mentioned are Viśvakarman (Vissakamma), the devas' craftsman and builder; Mātali, who drives Śakra's chariot; and Sujā, Śakra's wife and daughter of the Asura chief Vemacitrin (Vepacitti).

The Trāyastriṃśa heaven appears several times in Buddhist stories, in which either the Buddha ascends to Trāyastriṃśa, or (more often) deities from Trāyastriṃśa descend to meet the Buddha. The Buddha's mother, Maya, was reborn in the Tusita Heaven, and came down to visit Trāyastriṃśa heaven where her son taught her the abhidharma.

The "thirty-three" in the name of the heaven is not an enumeration of the gods who live there (there are far more) but a general term inherited from Vedic mythology, implying "the whole pantheon of gods". In Theravada Buddhist legends, there were 33 humans in Sakka's original group (who made enough merit to become devas atop Mount Sineru).

In Buddhism, there are "Yāmā devāḥ", "Tushitānāṃ", "Nirmāṇaratayaḥ devāḥ", and "Paranirmita-vaśavartinaḥ devāḥ" above Trāyastriṃśa and "Catumaharajika" below. They are called the six heavens together with Śakro devānām (Śakra). More heaven "Sunirmita devāḥ" is sometimes added to these depending on sūtras.

== Levels ==
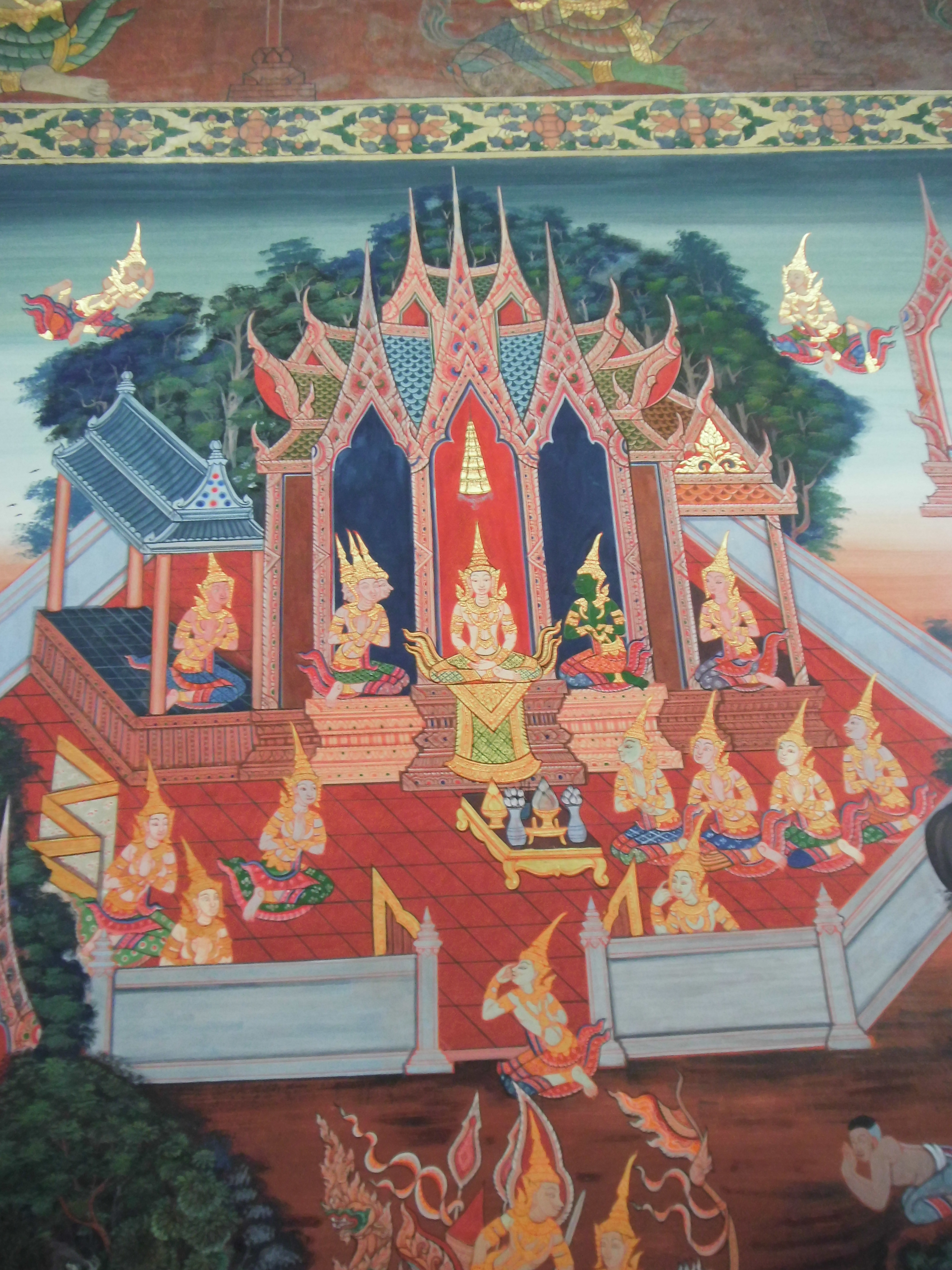
Gods and goddesses dwell on Trāyastriṃśa heaven in Thai mural

In Mahayana literature, Trāyastriṃśa is composed of thirty-three levels. These are enumerated in the Saddharmasmṛtyupasthāna Sūtra. The original Sanskrit names occasionally vary between extant Sanskrit manuscripts and Chinese texts.

1. Sudharmanivāsinī (善法堂天)
2. Tuṅganivāsinī (山峯天)
3. Śikharanivāsinī (山頂天)
4. Sudarśananivāsinī (善見城天)
5. Rasthanivāsinī (鉢私地天)
6. Koṭaranivāsinī (倶吒天)
7. Caitrarathanivāsinī (雑殿天)
8. Nandananivāsinī (歓喜園天)
9. Vaibhrājanivāsinī (光明天)
10. Pāriyātrakanivāsinī (波利耶多天)
11. Āmiśrataṭanivāsinī (離険岸天)
12. Kuñjarataṭanivāsinī (谷崖岸天)
13. Maṇigarbhānivāsinī (摩尼蔵天)
14. Āvartacarā (旋行天)
15. Tapanīyagṛhā (金殿天)
16. Mālācchāyā (鬘影天)
17. Nimnonnatācāriṇī (柔軟天)
18. Nānābhaktavicitrāśarīrā (雑荘厳天)
19. Yogavahā (如意天)
20. Sūkṣmacarā (微細行天)
21. Saṃhṛṣṭagītadhvanyabhiratā (歌音喜楽天)
22. Tejomālinī (威徳輪天)
23. Candrāyatanacarā / Candrāyaṇacarā (月行天)
24. Yamanaśālā (閻摩那娑羅天)
25. Nimeṣonmeṣagatī (速行天)
26. Prabalecchācchāyāśarīrā / Pramāṇecchāśarīrā / Pavanecchācchāyā / Pravaṇecchāśarīreṣu (影照天)
27. Maṇicīrā / Śalecarāḥ (智慧行天)
28. Nikāyasabhāginī (衆分天)
29. Maṇḍalanivāsinī / Maṇḍalaniratā (曼陀羅天)
30. Utkarṣacārinī / Autkarṣa (上行天)
31. Tejomukhā (威徳顔天)
32. Tejojālinī / Tejohvālāmālinī (威徳燄輪光天)
33. Prakīrṇakā (清浄天)

== Residents ==
Below is a list of the devas who are said to dwell here:

- Śakra

Śakra's wives

- Sujā

Śakra's sons

- Suvira
- Susīma

Śakra's daughters

- Āśā (Pali: Āsā) (Hope)
- Śraddhā (Pali: Saddhā) (Faith)
- Śrī (Pali: Sirī) (Glory)
- Hrī (Pali: Hirī) (Modesty)

Others

- Viśvakarmā – the architect of the devas
- Prajāpati
- Varuṇa
- Īśāna
- Mātali – Śakra's charioteer
- Pañcaśikha
- Suvīra
- Susīma
- Jālinī
- Airāvata – Śakra's elephant mount
- Pārileyyaka – an elephant that was reborn in heaven after serving the Buddha

== Origins ==
In Buddhism, Tāvatiṁsa (Pali) has an interesting origin story. Many eras ago, before the Historical Buddha, there lived a man named Magha. He was a village leader and gathered 33 companions to help him do good merit, such as build rest houses, plant trees, etc. Naturally, him and his companions died due to old age or disease. Because of their good deeds, Magha was reborn as Sakka, the Devaraja (King of Devas) of Tāvatiṁsa, and his 33 companions were reborn as the Thirty-Three Great Gods of Tāvatiṁsa. When Sakka and his Thirty-Three gods were reborn into Tāvatiṁsa, the Asuras (which were the ones who lived in the Heaven at the time) prepared a giant feast with lots of Sura. Sakka told his 33 Gods to refuse, because they would be heavily intoxicated after drinking it. When the feast was done, the Asuras were heavily intoxicated, just like Sakka said. Him and his 33 Gods made the decision to throw the Asuras off of Sumeru due to them being a danger to the sanctity and morality of the heaven. The Asuras woke up at the lower point of Sumeru, and felt betrayed. They made a vow to never drink Sura again, which explains their name. (lit. "not-sura") They constantly attempt to get back their home through force, climbing up Sumeru and fighting the Devas of both Catumaharajika (first heaven) and Tāvatiṁsa (second heaven).

== See also ==
- Svarga
- Thirty-three gods, the Hindu equivalent
