= Lake Manasarovar =

Freshwater lake in the Tibet Region

Lake Mansarovar
- Mapam Yumtso (Standard Tibetan)
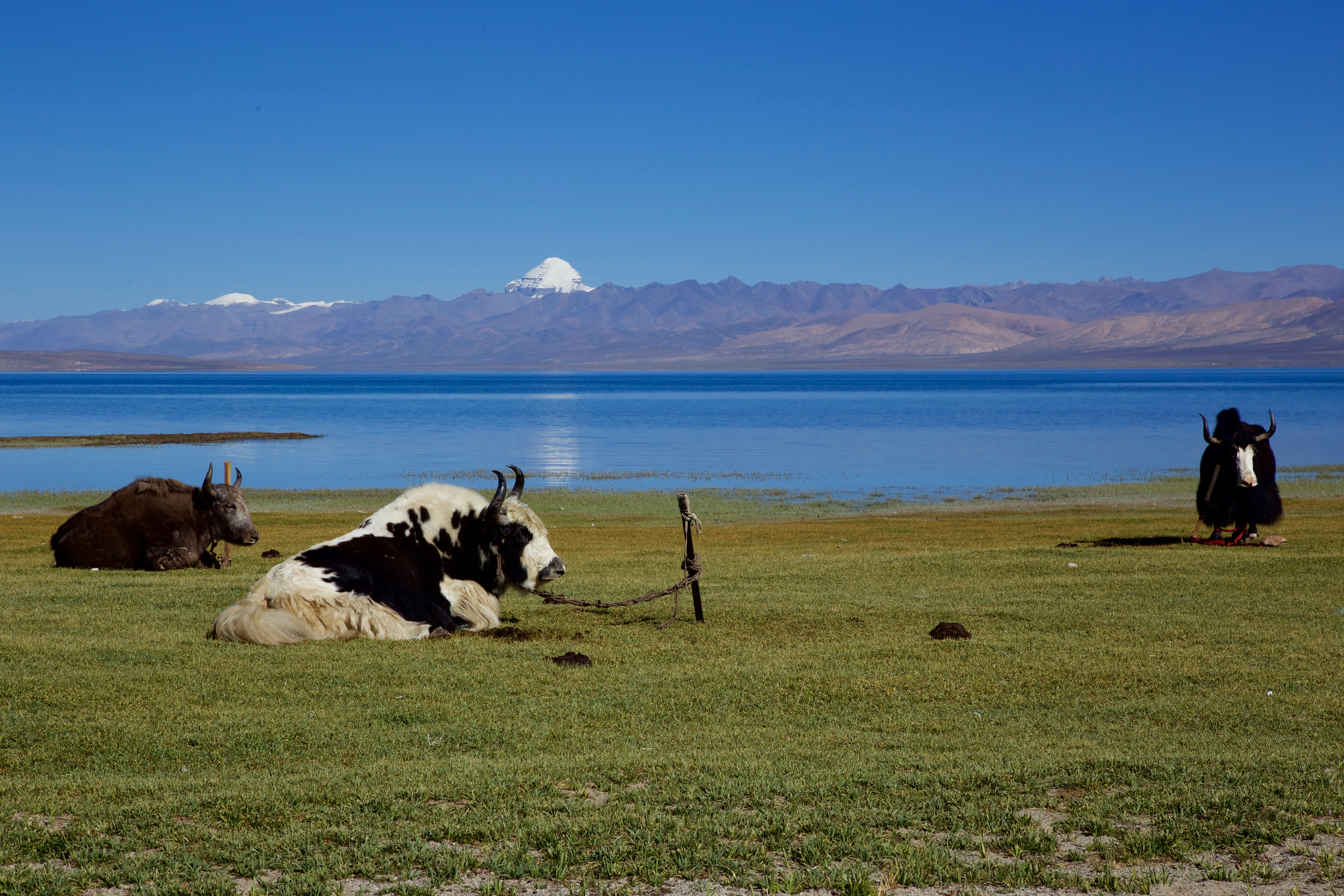
- Lake Manasarovar with Mount Kailash in the background

- Location within Tibet Location within Ngari Location within China
- Location: Burang County, Ngari Prefecture, Tibet Autonomous Region, China
- Coordinates: 30.65°N 81.45°E
- Type: Freshwater lake
- Surface area: 320 km^{2} (120 sq mi)
- Max. depth: 100 m (330 ft)
- Surface elevation: 4,586 m (15,046 ft)
- Frozen: Winter

Ramsar Wetland
- Designated: 7 December 2004
- Reference no.: 1439

Lake Manasarovar, (Note: Sanskrit: मानसरोवर, romanized: Mānasarovara) also called Mapam Yumtso, (Note: Tibetan: མ་ཕམ་གཡུ་མཚོ།, Wylie: ma pham g.yu mtsho, THL: ma pam yu tso; Chinese: 瑪旁雍錯; pinyin: Mǎ páng yōng cuò) (Note: Alternative names include Mapang Tso, Tso Mapam, Tsang Tso (Tibetan: ཚངས་མཚོ, Wylie: tshangs mtsho, THL: tsang tso), and Tso Madröpa (Wylie: mtsho ma dros pa).) is a high altitude freshwater lake near Mount Kailash in Burang County, Ngari Prefecture, Tibet Autonomous Region, China. It is located at an elevation of 4,586 m (15,046 ft), near the western trijunction between China, India and Nepal. It overflows into the adjacent salt-water lake of Rakshastal via the Ganga Chhu. The sources of four rivers: Indus, Sutlej, Brahmaputra, and Karnali lie in the vicinity of the region.

The lake is sacred in Hinduism, Buddhism, Jainism and the Bon religion. People from India, China, Nepal and other countries in the region undertake a pilgrimage to the region. The pilgrimage generally involves trekking towards Lake Manasarovar and a circumambulation of the nearby Mount Kailash.

== Etymology ==
The Sanskrit word Manasarovara (मानसरोवर) is a combination of two Sanskrit words, mānas (मानस्) meaning "mind" (generally denotes the mental powers associated including intellect, perception, conscience) and sarovara (सरोवर) meaning "lake or a large pond". The lake is called as Mapam Yumtso (Tibetan: མ་ཕམ་གཡུ་མཚོ།, Wylie: ma pham g.yu mtsho, THL: ma pam yu tso; Chinese: 瑪旁雍錯; pinyin: Mǎ páng yōng cuò) and Tso Madröpa locally. In his Tibetan-English dictionary, Sarat Chandra Das states that Mapam Yumtso is derived from Mapam meaning unconquerable or invincible and Tso Madröpa is derived from Madropa meaning "ground heated by the Sun" both used in combination with Tso, the Tibetan word for lake.

== Geography ==
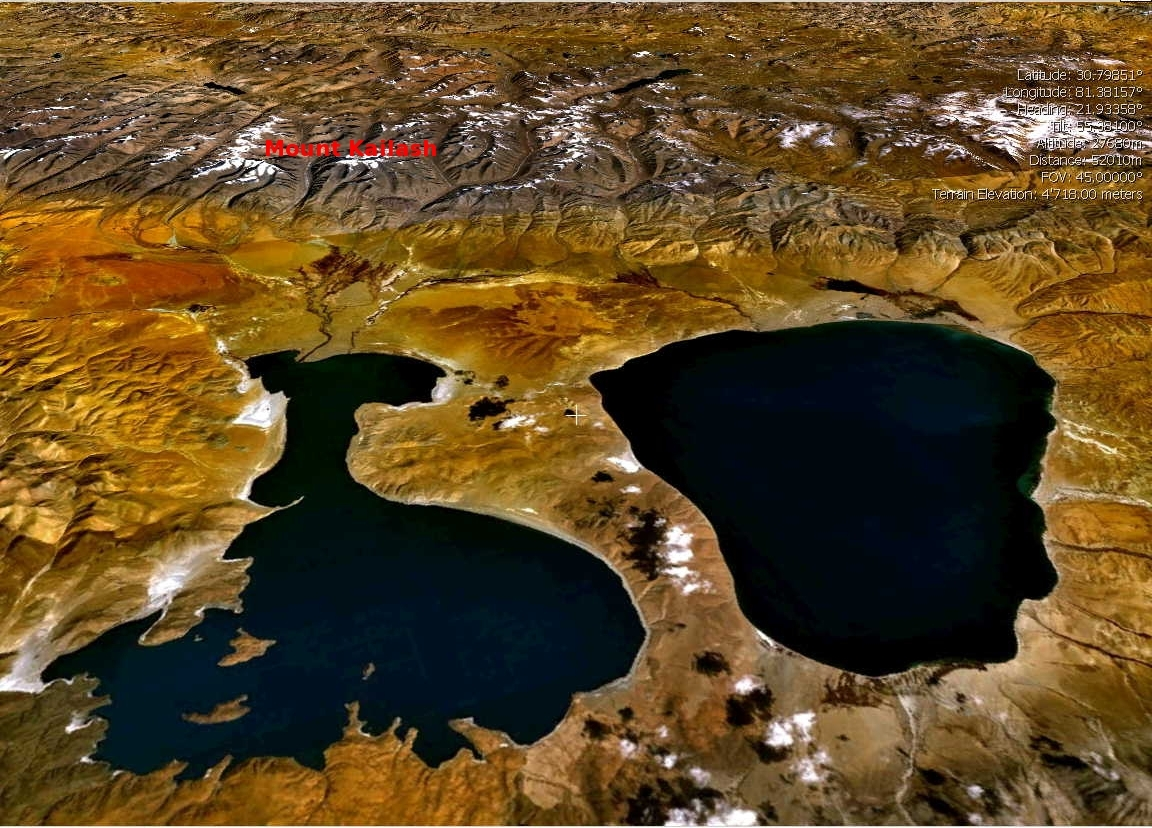
Satellite imagery showing Manasarovar (right) and Rakshastal with Mount Kailash

Lake Manasarovar is located in Ngari Prefecture, Tibet Autonomous Region of China. It is located in the southwest region of Tibet north of the western tripoint of the border between China, India and Nepal. It is visible from the Lapcha La pass above the Limi valley in Nepal on a clear day. The freshwater lake lies at 4,586 m (15,046 ft) above mean sea level on the mostly saline lake-studded Tibetan Plateau and is one of the highest freshwater lakes in Asia.

Spread over a surface area of 320 km^{2} (120 sq mi), Lake Manasarovar is relatively round in shape with a circumference of 88 km (55 mi) and a maximum depth of 100 m (330 ft). Manasarovar overflows into the salt-water endorheic lake of Rakshastal via the natural Ganga Chhu channel. The major rivers rising from the region include Yarlung Tsangpo (which becomes the Brahmaputra), the Indus, the Sutlej and the Karnali, a tributary of Ganges.

== Climate ==
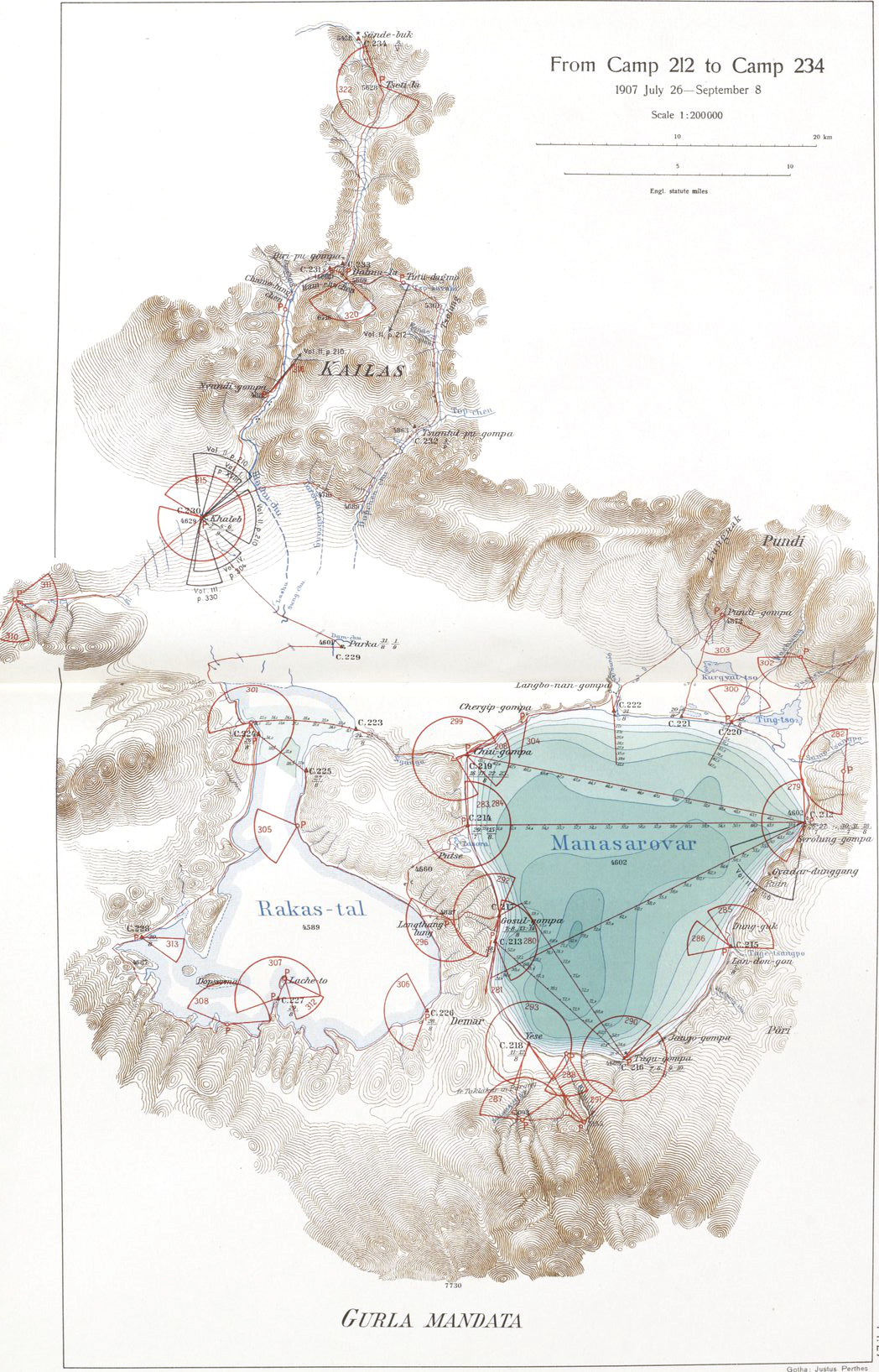
Sven Hedin's map of the region c. 1907

The weather is fairly dry during April to June with day time temperatures of more than 5 °C (41 °F) and night time temperatures close to 0 °C (32 °F). The temperature starts to decrease in October with January being the coldest. Winters have day time temperatures below freezing with colder nights. Monsoon bring rain from late June to August with cold winds.

Global warming is described as happening more rapidly on the Tibetan Plateau than anywhere else in the world. According to locals, the land around the region has been growing warmer in recent years with winters not as cold as it used to be. The retreating glaciers and thawing of the permafrost in the Tibet region might lead to uncertain effects on water resources of the region. These effects along with population explosion and tourism has put severe stress on the fragile ecosystem.

Climate data for Lake Manasarovar
Month	Jan	Feb	Mar	Apr	May	Jun	Jul	Aug	Sep	Oct	Nov	Dec	Year
Mean daily maximum °C (°F)	−3.2 (26.2)	−2.0 (28.4)	0.9 (33.6)	6.4 (43.5)	10.2 (50.4)	13.7 (56.7)	13.7 (56.7)	13.1 (55.6)	13.1 (55.6)	11.1 (52.0)	6.5 (43.7)	1.0 (33.8)	7.0 (44.7)
Daily mean °C (°F)	−8.9 (16.0)	−7.6 (18.3)	−4.2 (24.4)	−0.1 (31.8)	3.1 (37.6)	7.1 (44.8)	8.4 (47.1)	8.0 (46.4)	8.0 (46.4)	5.4 (41.7)	−0.2 (31.6)	−5.1 (22.8)	1.2 (34.1)
Mean daily minimum °C (°F)	−14.5 (5.9)	−13.1 (8.4)	−9.2 (15.4)	−6.6 (20.1)	−4.0 (24.8)	0.6 (33.1)	3.1 (37.6)	3.0 (37.4)	−0.2 (31.6)	−6.8 (19.8)	−11.1 (12.0)	−13.3 (8.1)	−6.0 (21.2)
Average precipitation mm (inches)	52 (2.0)	34 (1.3)	52 (2.0)	30 (1.2)	26 (1.0)	40 (1.6)	125 (4.9)	135 (5.3)	66 (2.6)	29 (1.1)	7 (0.3)	18 (0.7)	614 (24)
Source: Climate-Data.org

== Religious significance ==
=== Hinduism ===
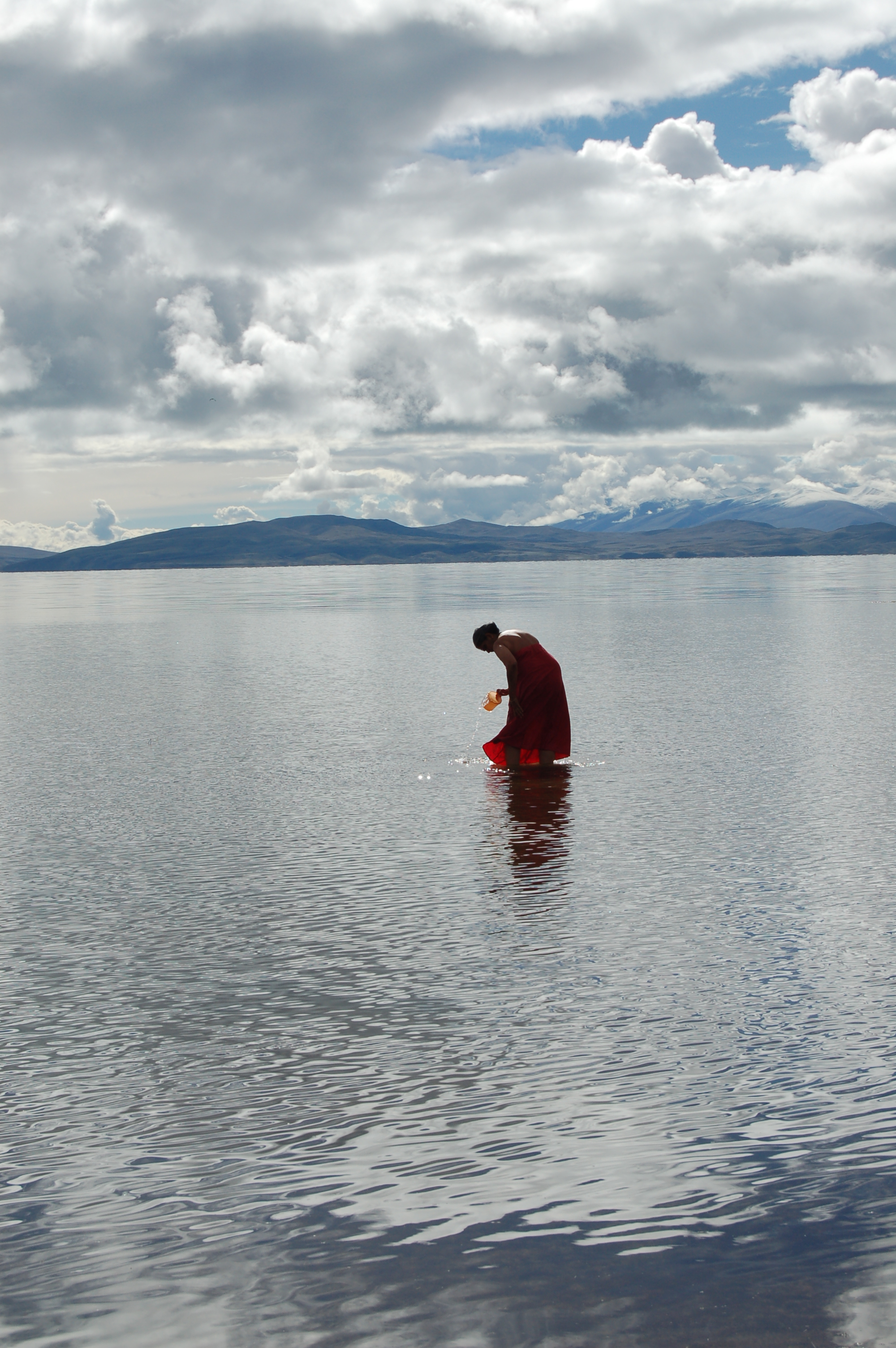
Pilgrim taking a dip

In Hindu literature, Mansarovar is mentioned by name in the Hindu epics Ramayana and Mahabharata. Though modern texts state the lake to be among the most sacred sites of Hinduism, there is no explicit mention of the lake in early Vedic literature. The Rigveda mentions that the Indus River flows north because of Indra, a geographical reality only in the Tibet region. According to Frits Staal, this makes it likely that some of the ancient Vedic people traced the route of the Indus river and had seen the valley near Mount Kailash.

The early Hindu texts mention a mythical Mount Meru and lake Manasa. The mythical Manasa lake is described as one created through the mind of Brahma as the preferred abode of his vahana hamsa. In the Ramayana, Vishvamitra tells Rama that Brahma created a lake out of his consciousness (Manas), hence the name Manas Sarovar (lake of consciousness) and a river was born out of that lake called Sarayu, which flowed through the kingdom of Ayodhya.

Mount Kailash on the banks of Lake Manasarovar is believed to be the abode of Shiva. This is where the holy river Ganges was tamed by Shiva and sent to nourish the fertile valleys below the Himalayas.

=== Buddhism and Bon ===
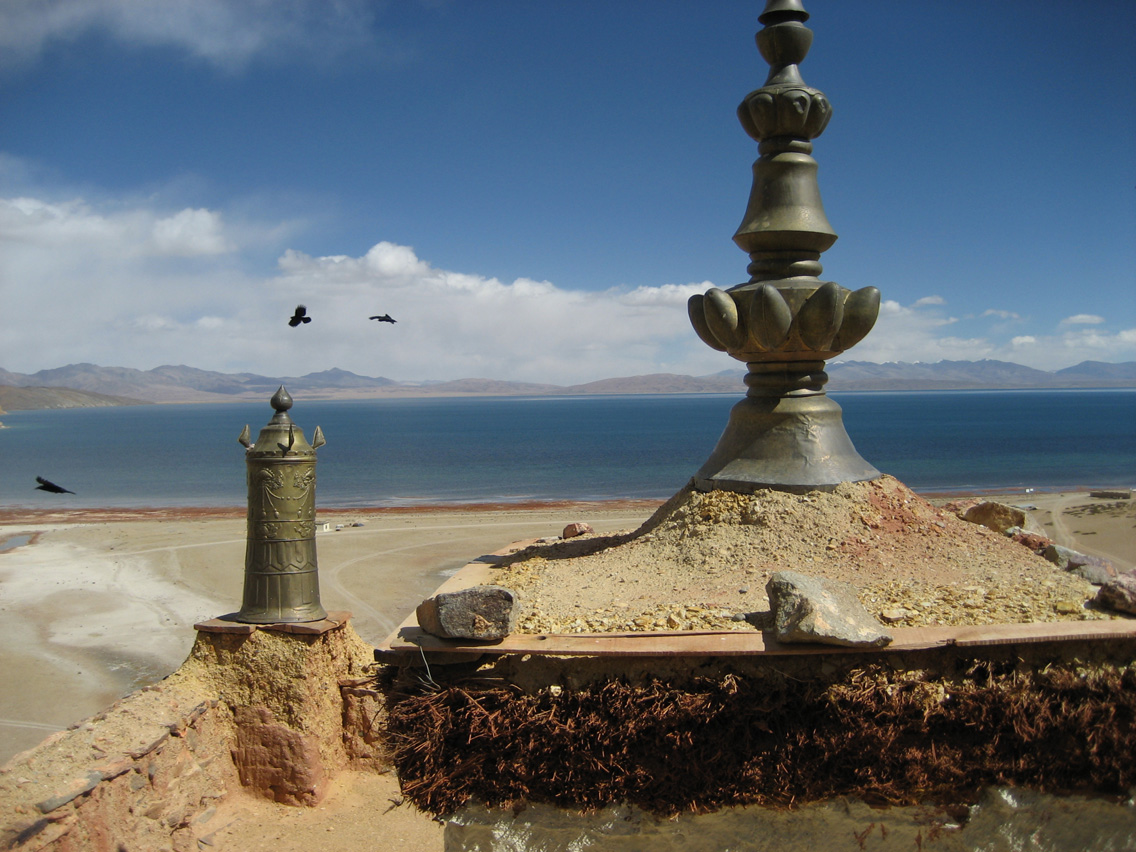
Chiu Gompa Monastery

Lake Manasarovar and Mount Kailash are central to Buddhist cosmology, and a major pilgrimage site for some Buddhist traditions. Kailash is known as the mythological Mount Meru. In Buddhism, Kailash represents the father of the world and Lake Mansarovar symbolizes the mother. According to mythology, Maya bathed at Manasarovar to purify herself before Buddha could enter her womb. Numerous sites in the region are associated with Padmasambhava, who is credited with establishing Tantric Buddhism in Tibet in the 8th century CE. Vajrayana Buddhists believe that saint Milarepa (c. 1052 – c. 1135) had a challenge with Naro Böncham, a follower of Bön religion on the banks of Manasarovar.

For the Bon people, the region was the centre of the ancient Bon empire of Zhang Zhung and is associated with the holy place of Zhang Zhung Meri deity. As per Tibetan beliefs, the region was the source of the mythical Lion, Horse, Peacock, and Elephant Rivers. When Tonpa Shenrab, the founder of the Bon religion, visited Tibet for the first time and bathed in the lake.

=== Jainism ===
In Jainism, Lake Manasarovar is associated with its founder and the first Tirthankara, Rishabhanatha. As per Jain scriptures, he attained nirvana on the Ashtapad Mountain. It is believed by Jains that after Rishabhanatha attained nirvana, his son emperor Bharata had constructed three stupas and twenty four shrines of the 24 tirthankaras in the region. There are other stories related to the region relating to Mahavira, Kumar and Sagar, Tapas Kher Parna, Ravana and Mandodari, among many others.

== Pilgrimage ==
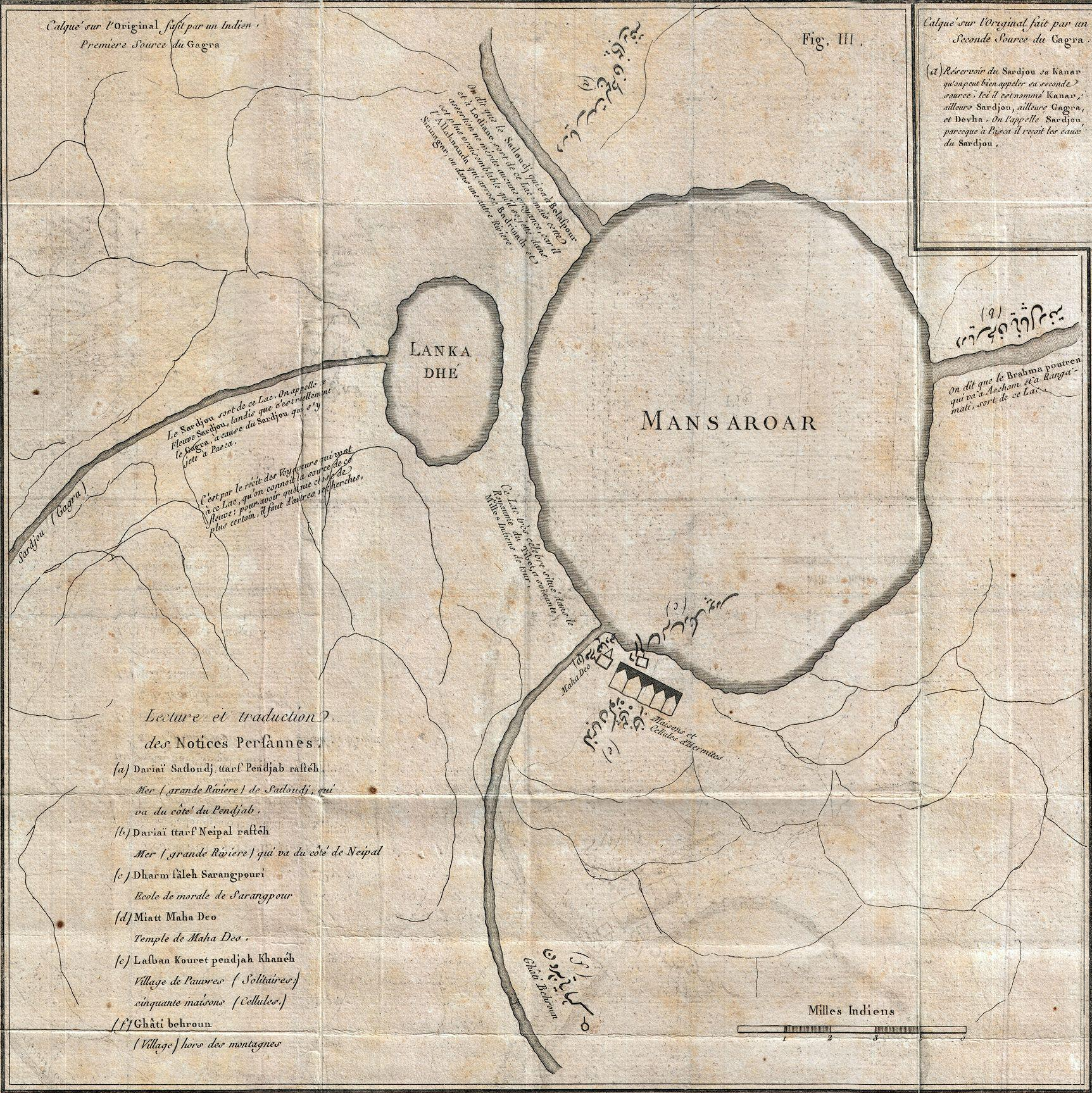
Map of Manasarovar by Joseph Tiefenthaler c. 1784

The lake has been mentioned in various Hindu and Buddhist religious literature. It was part of one of the oldest pilgrimage routes, which has been in existence for many years. Though modern texts state the lake to be among the most sacred sites of various religions, there is no explicit mention of the lake being a pilgrimage site in early literature. Typically, historic pilgrimage sites that were frequented by Buddhists, Hindus and Jains attracted discussion in their respective texts and the construction of infrastructure by wealthy patrons or kings. The Hindu Puranas indicate various infrastructure, such as temples, dharmasalas, ashrams, and pilgrimage facilities at such sites. But at least until the 1930s, there was no evidence of such structures in the Kailash-Manasarovar region. According to Luciano Petech, Tibetan records indicate that the region was considered to be their sacred geography by the late 12th-century, with reports of Buddhist monks meditating in the Go-zul cave of Kailash and circumambulating the mountain. According to Alex McKay, the possible synthesis of esoteric Buddhism and Shaivism may have expanded and brought Kailash and Manasarovar into the shared sacred geography for both Buddhists and Hindus. The 13th-century text Mahanirvana Tantra dedicates its first chapter to Kailash and Manasarovar lake as a pilgrimage site.

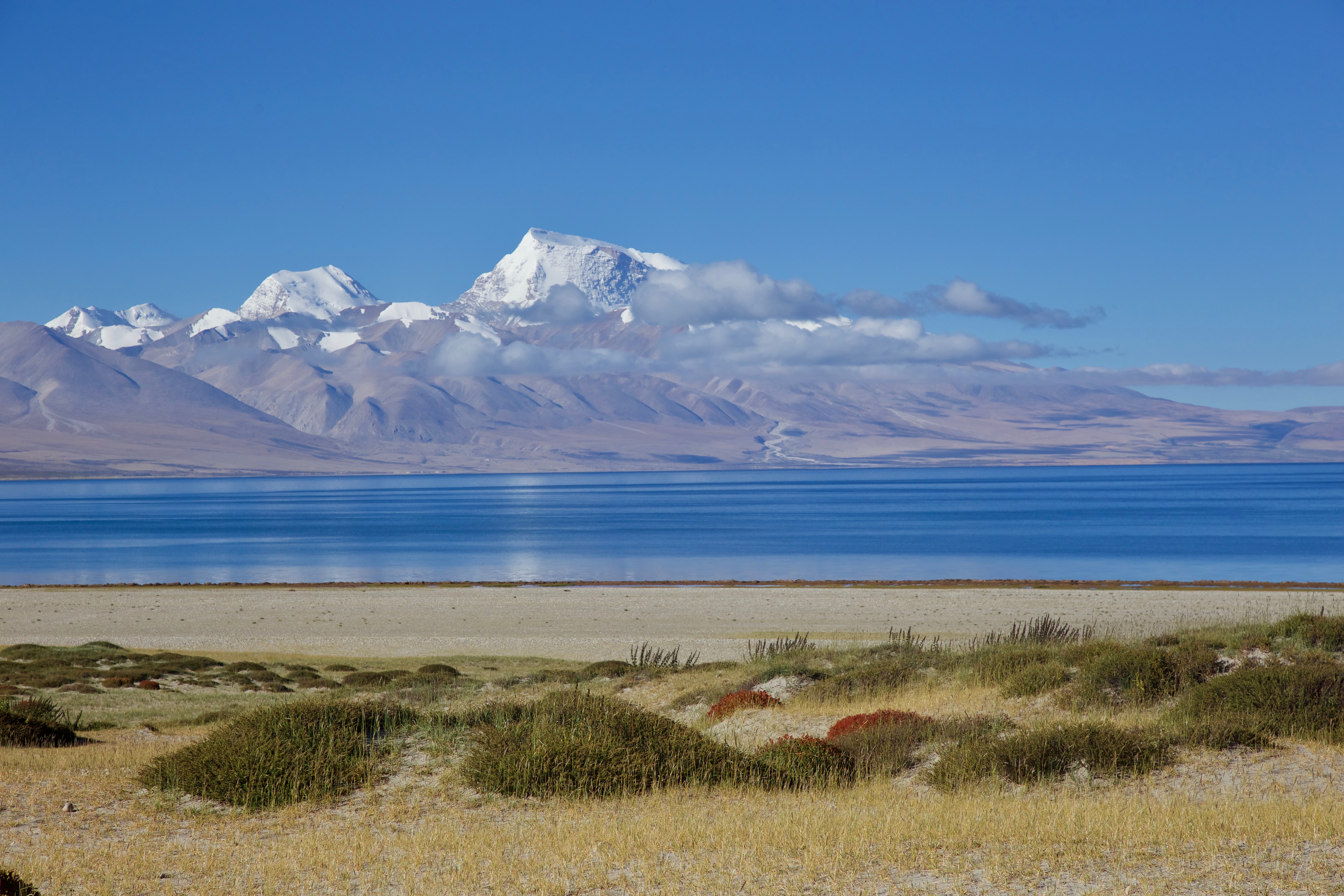
Lake Manasarovar with Gurla Mandhata in the background

Due to its perceived sacredness to various religions, people undertake a pilgrimage called yatra to the Kailash-Manasarovar. Pilgrimage to the mountain increased in the 1930s but was affected later due to both China and the British Empire claiming the region. Religious pilgrimages to Mount Kailas and Manasarovar were permitted by China after its occupation of Tibet in 1950–51. While pilgrimage from India was guaranteed by the 1954 Sino-Indian Agreement, access was restricted after the subsequent 1959 Tibetan uprising, and the borders were closed after the Sino-Indian War in 1962. After nearly two decades, pilgrimage from India was allowed in 1981 after an agreement between the governments of India and China. The pilgrimage was suspended for three years since 2020 due to the COVID-19 pandemic. The route was re-opened in 2023 with new regulations. Since the reopening of the pilgrimage route from India in 1981, the numbers of pilgrims going on the annual yatra has grown considerably. Before the closure in 2020, several thousand pilgrims from India were going to this pilgrimage every year.

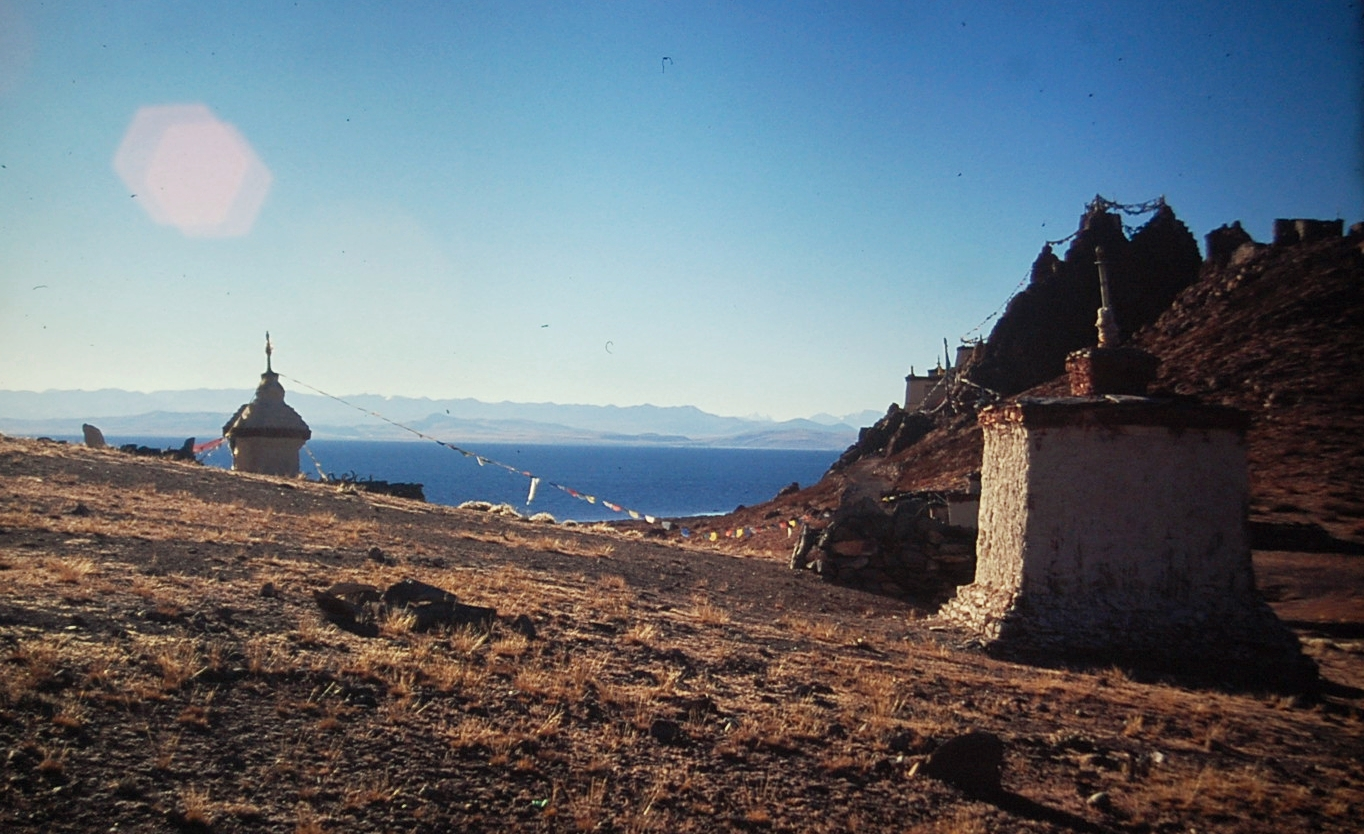
Temples and stupas on the lake shore

In India, the pilgrimage is organized by the Government of India and is permitted between June and September. Since 2015, aspiring pilgrims from India were required to apply in advance to the Ministry of External Affairs and specific number of passes were issued to pilgrims by computerized random selection with preference given to first timers. Pilgrims from India travel through two routes opened for the purpose, with border crossings at Lipu Lekh pass in Uttarakhand and the Nathu La pass in Sikkim. Since 2020, a motorable road is available till the Lipu Lekh pass through the Indian side of the Mahakali valley, before crossing over to China. The Nathu La route was opened in 2015 and involves traveling to Gangtok before crossing the Nathu La pass into China.

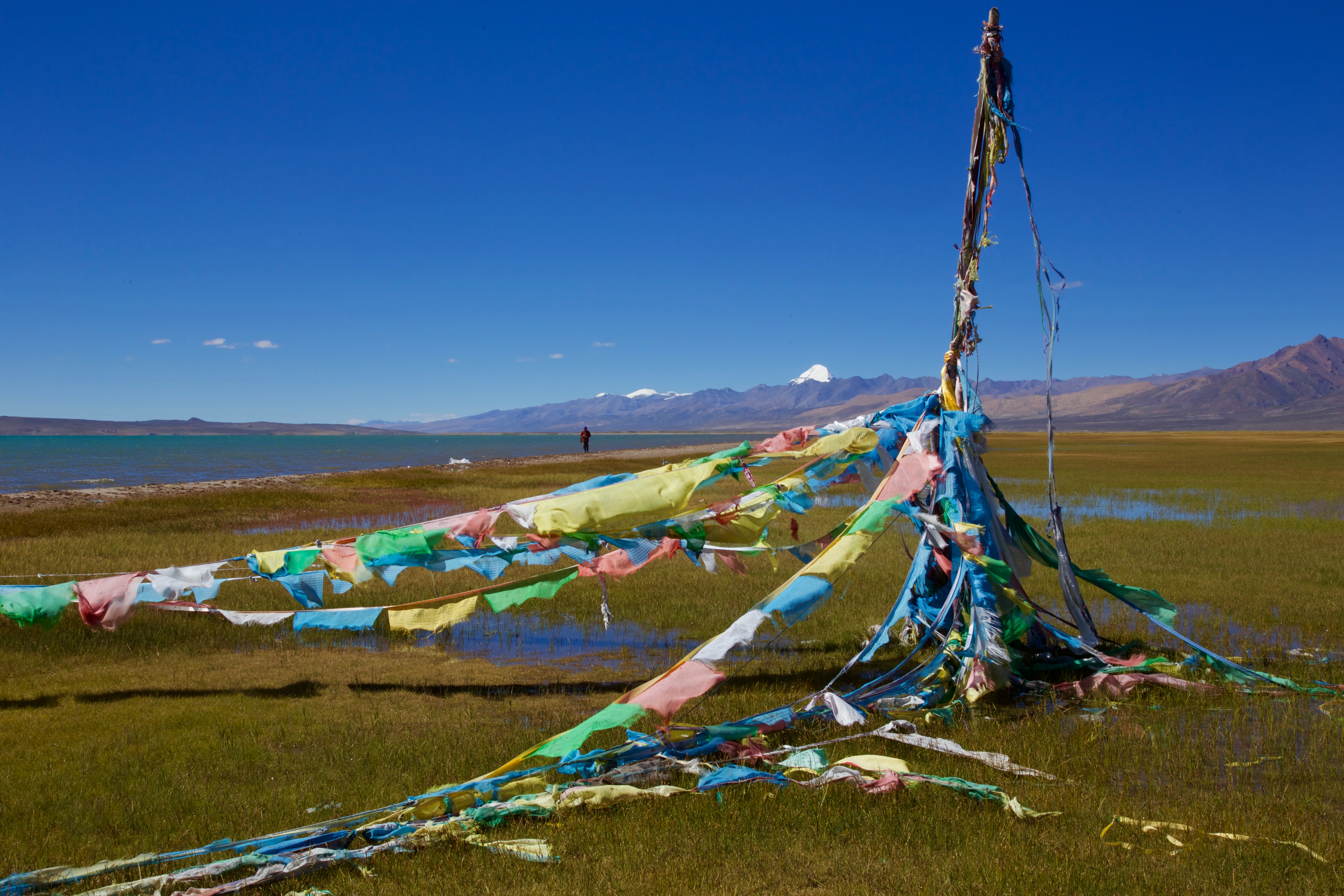
Buddhist Prayer flags on the shore

As the April 2015 Nepal Earthquake resulted in the closure of the border crossing at Tatopani-Zangmu, the pilgrimage from Nepal is generally done from the nearby Humla district in northwestern Nepal. Another route exists through the crossing at Rasuwa-Gyirong. Pilgrims could reach Lhasa by air before the journey to Lake Manasarovar.

The pilgrimage involves trekking towards Lake Mansarovar and a circumambulation of Mount Kailash. The path around Mount Kailash is 53 km (33 mi) long. The circumambulation known as kora, is made in a clockwise direction by Hindus, Buddhists, and Jains, while Bönpos circumambulate the mountain in a counterclockwise direction. Pilgrims believe that bathing in the lake and circling the mountain is a spiritually beneficial practice that can bring various positive effects, such as the cleansing of one's sins. For the Khas people of the nearby region of Humla in northwest Nepal, a ritual bath in the lake is an important step in gaining their shamanic powers. There are many stupas, flag poles, Buddhist monasteries and praying stations on the banks of the lake, though a significant number of structures were destroyed during the Cultural Revolution of China from 1966 to 1976.
