= Lake Rakshastal =

Lake

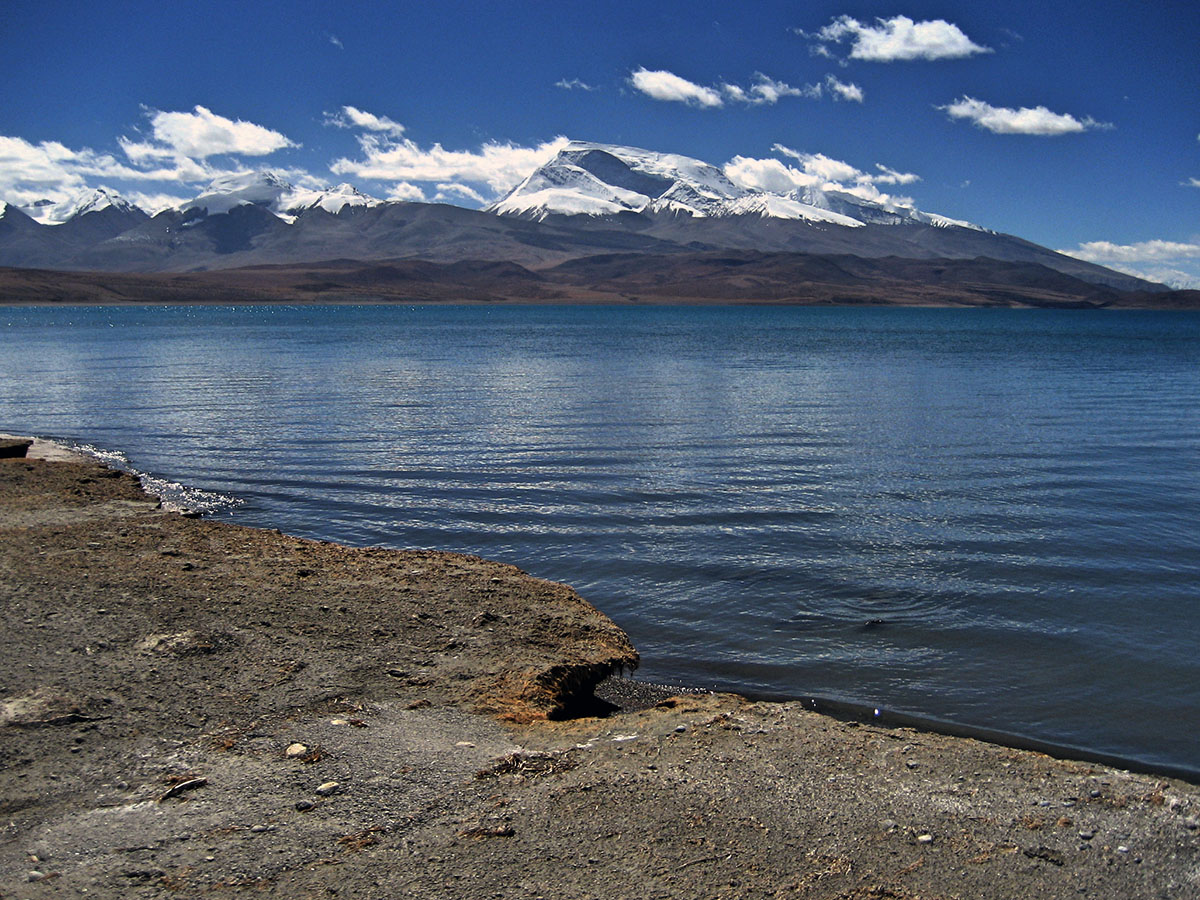
- View South from Rakshas Tal Lake (2006)

- Location within Ngari Lake Rakshastal (Tibet) Lake Rakshastal (China)
- Location: Burang County, Tibet Autonomous Region, China
- Coordinates: 30.65°N 81.25°E
- Type: Salt lake
- Surface area: 250 km^{2} (97 sq mi)
- Surface elevation: 4,572 m (15,000 ft)

Ramsar Wetland
- Designated: 7 December 2004
- Reference no.: 1439

Lake Rakshastal (Sanskrit: राक्षसताल, romanized: Rākṣasatāla), also known as Langa Tso (Tibetan: ལ་ལྔ་མཚོ, Wylie: la-lnga mtsho; Chinese: 拉昂错; pinyin: Lā'áng cuò), is a saltwater lake in Tibet Autonomous Region of China, lying just west of Lake Manasarovar and south of Mount Kailash. The Sutlej River (also known by the Tibetan name Langqen Zangbo in this area) originates about 17 km to the west. Rakshas Tal is at 4,572 metres (15,000 ft) above sea level whereas the Manasarovar is at 4,586 metres (15,046 ft).

== Etymology ==
The name of the lake literally means "lake of the rakshasa" in Sanskrit. It is also known as Ravan Tal, as it is considered to be the site of the penance performed by Ravana, the rakshasa king of Lanka.

In Buddhism, Lake Manasarovar, which is round like the sun, and Rakshastal, shaped as a crescent, are respectively regarded as "brightness" and "darkness". Rakshastal is a saline lake. A short, natural river named Ganga Chhu, which connects Lake Manasarovar with Rakshastal, is traditionally believed to be created by rishis to add pure water from Manasarovar.

There are four islands in Rakshastal, named Topserma (Dose), Dola (the two biggest), Lachato (Nadzhado), and Dosharba. The islands are used by local people as winter pastures for their yaks.

In the Tibetan language, the lake is known as Langa Tso (la-lnga mtsho).

== Religious significance ==
According to Hindu scriptures, Rakshastal was created by Ravana for the express purpose of garnering superpowers through acts of devotion and meditation to the god, Shiva, who resided on Mount Kailash. It was upon the banks of a special island in this lake that he would make a daily offering with one of his ten heads as a sacrifice to please Shiva. Finally, on the tenth day, Shiva was moved enough by his devotion to grant Ravana his wish to obtain superpowers.

As there are no plants or wildlife around the lake, its lifeless surroundings caused the Tibetans to refer it as "the Ghost Lake". Visitors who approach the lake must be respectful to avoid inauspicious mishaps.

== Geography ==
Rakshastal covers a total area of 250 square kilometres (97 sq mi), at an altitude of 4,572 metres (15,000 ft). Though absent of nearby grasslands, the white cobbles, the hills and the island colored with dark red, and the deep blue lake water present another distinctive picture absent from many of the places more frequented by visitors. In 2004, Lake Manasarovar and Rakshastal were designated as a single Ramsar Wetland complex, under the name 'Mapangyong Cuo'.

== Access ==
Lake Rakshastal lies right next to Lake Manasarovar, and is an integral part of the Kailash-Manasarovar pilgrimage.

== Climate ==
Climate data for Lake Rakshastal
Month	Jan	Feb	Mar	Apr	May	Jun	Jul	Aug	Sep	Oct	Nov	Dec	Year
Mean daily maximum °C (°F)	−2.7 (27.1)	−1.5 (29.3)	1.3 (34.3)	6.7 (44.1)	10.5 (50.9)	13.7 (56.7)	13.6 (56.5)	13.1 (55.6)	11.1 (52.0)	6.6 (43.9)	1.5 (34.7)	−0.8 (30.6)	6.1 (43.0)
Daily mean °C (°F)	−8.2 (17.2)	−6.9 (19.6)	−3.7 (25.3)	0.3 (32.5)	3.5 (38.3)	7.3 (45.1)	8.5 (47.3)	8.2 (46.8)	5.6 (42.1)	0.2 (32.4)	−4.5 (23.9)	−6.6 (20.1)	0.3 (32.6)
Mean daily minimum °C (°F)	−13.6 (7.5)	−12.3 (9.9)	−8.6 (16.5)	−6.0 (21.2)	−3.4 (25.9)	1.0 (33.8)	3.4 (38.1)	3.3 (37.9)	0.1 (32.2)	−6.2 (20.8)	−10.4 (13.3)	−12.4 (9.7)	−5.4 (22.2)
Average precipitation mm (inches)	58 (2.3)	39 (1.5)	58 (2.3)	34 (1.3)	29 (1.1)	46 (1.8)	142 (5.6)	152 (6.0)	76 (3.0)	32 (1.3)	8 (0.3)	20 (0.8)	694 (27.3)
Source: Climate-Data.org

== See also ==
- Lake Manasarovar
- Mount Kailash
