= Ganga Chhu =

River in China

Ganga Chhu is a river in the Tibet Autonomous Region, China. It is located between lake Manasarovar (4,604 metres (15,105 ft) MSL) and Rakshas Tal (4,580 m (15,030 ft) MSL). It has a length of about 10 km (6.2 mi). Since May 2010, owing to a fall in the level of lake Manasarovar, the visible source of the river from Manasarovar is absent. However, owing to the presence of hot wells at a monastery, the river Ganga Chhu nevertheless bears the waters of Lake Rakshas Tal.
