= Mount Kailash =

Religious mountain in Tibet Autonomous Region in China

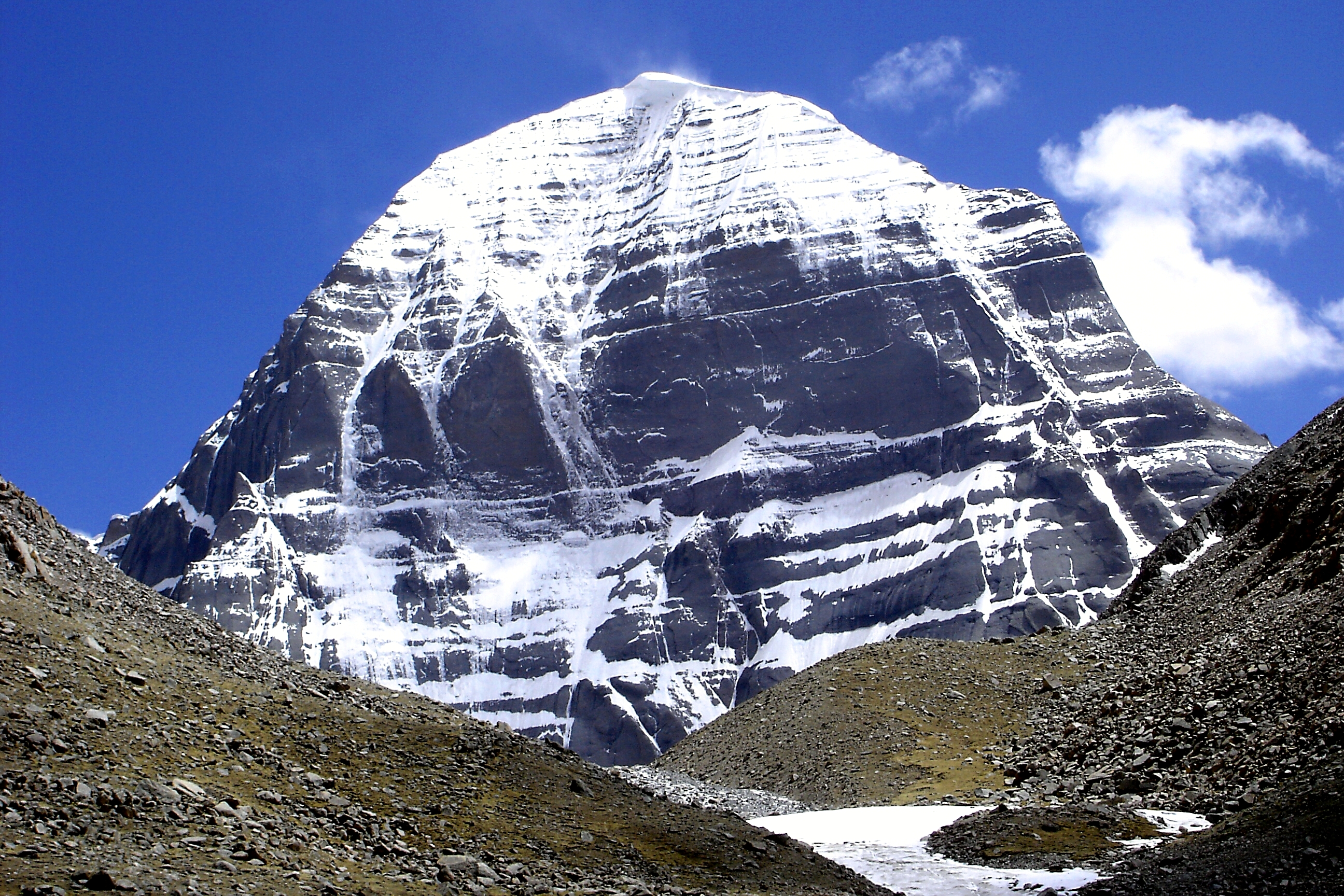
- North face of Mount Kailash

Highest point
- Elevation: 6,638 m (21,778 ft)
- Coordinates: 31°4′0″N 81°18′45″E

Naming
- Native name: Gang Tise (Standard Tibetan); Gang Rinpoche (Standard Tibetan)

Geography
- Location within Ngari
- Location: Burang County, Tibet Autonomous Region
- Country: China
- Parent range: Gangdise Shan

Climbing
- First ascent: None (prohibited)

Mount Kailash (Note: also known as Kailasa (Sanskrit: कैलास; Kailāsa), Gang Tise (Standard Tibetan: གངས་ཏི་སེ།), and Gang Rinpoche or Kangrinboqê (Standard Tibetan: གངས་རིན་པོ་ཆེ; simplified Chinese: 冈仁波齐峰; traditional Chinese: 岡仁波齊峰; pinyin: Gāngrénbōqí Fēng)) is a mountain in Ngari Prefecture, Tibet Autonomous Region of China. It lies in the Gangdise Shan mountain range of the Transhimalaya, in the western part of the Tibetan Plateau. The peak of Mount Kailash is located at an elevation of 6,638 m (21,778 ft), near the western trijunction of China, India, and Nepal.

Mount Kailash is located close to Manasarovar and Rakshastal lakes. The sources of four rivers–Indus, Sutlej, Brahmaputra, and Ghaghara–lie in the vicinity of the region. The mountain is considered sacred in Bon, Buddhism, Hinduism, and Jainism. Various groups undertake pilgrimages to the mountain, which generally involves trekking towards Lake Manasarovar and a circumambulation of the mountain.

While the mountain has been surveyed by climbers in the past, there has been no recorded successful ascent of the mountain. The climbing of the mountain is prohibited by the Chinese government due to its religious significance.

== Etymology ==
The mountain is known as "Kailāsa" (कैलास; var. Kailāśa कैलाश) in Sanskrit. The name could have been derived from the word "kelāsa" (केलास), which means "crystal".

In his Tibetan-English dictionary, Sarat Chandra Das states that 'kai la ca' (Wylie: kai la ca) from Sanskrit Kailāsa is used to denote the mountain. The mountain is called Gang Rinpoche (Tibetan: གངས་རིན་པོ་ཆེ་; simplified Chinese: 冈仁波齐峰; traditional Chinese: 岡仁波齊峰) or Gang Tise locally. Gang Rinpoche means "snow jewel mountain" with Kang (or Gang) being the Tibetan word meaning white mountain (snow peak) and rinpoche is an honorific meaning "precious one". Gang Tise means "mountain of ice or cool".

"Tibetan Buddhists call it Kangri Rinpoche; 'Precious Snow Mountain'. Bon texts have many names: Water's Flower, Mountain of Sea Water, Nine Stacked Swastikas Mountain. For Hindus, it is the home of the Hindu god Shiva...for Jains it is where their first leader was enlightened; for Buddhists, the navel of the universe; and for adherents of Bon, the abode of the sky goddess Sipaimen."

— Alice Albinia lists some of the names for the mountain, and its religious significance to various faiths

== Geography and topography ==
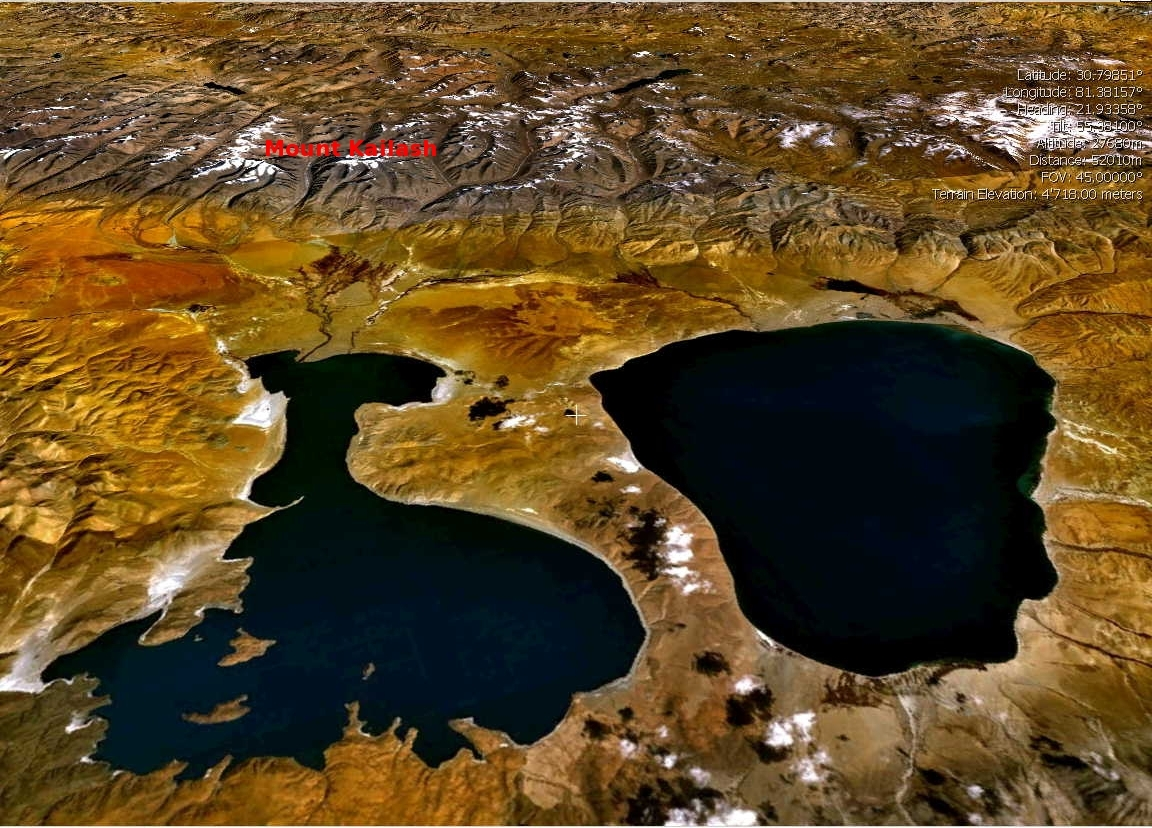
Topography of the region with Mount Kailash in the background and Manasarovar (right) and Rakshastal lakes in the foreground

Mount Kailash is located in Ngari Prefecture, Tibet Autonomous Region of China. It lies in the Gangdise Shan (also called the Kailash Range) of the Transhimalaya, in the western part of the Tibetan Plateau. The peak of Mount Kailash stands at an elevation of 6,638 m (21,778 ft). The region is situated north of the western tripoint of the border between China, India, and Nepal.

The major rivers rising from the western Gangdise Mountains are the Yarlung Tsangpo (which becomes the Brahmaputra), the Indus, the Sutlej, and the Ghaghara (a tributary of the Ganges). All these river systems originate within a 60 km (37 mi) stretch in the region. Mount Kailash is located on the banks of Manasarovar and Rakshastal lakes. Spread over an area of 320 km^{2} (120 sq mi), Manasarovar is the highest freshwater lake in the world.

=== Geology ===
The region around Mount Kailash comprises remnants of large ice sheets that covered the region during the Quaternary period, the last of which retreated about 10,000 years ago. The mountain might be a large metasedimentary roof pendant supported by a base of granite. The Indus headwaters area is typified by wide-scale faulting of metamorphosed late-Cretaceous to mid-Cenozoic sedimentary rocks interspersed with igneous Cenozoic granitic rocks. These Cenozoic rocks represent offshore marine limestones deposited before subduction of the Tethys oceanic crust. These sediments were deposited on the southern margin of the Asia block during subduction of the Tethys oceanic crust before the collision between the Indian and Asian continents. It also consists of sand dunes covering late Eocene volcanic forms interspersed with Cretaceous and Eocene sediments.

The Kailash flysch zone extends about 20 km (12 mi) from the mountain, marking the northern end of the Himalayas and the start of the Transhimalayas. The Transhimalayan range was formed by the subduction of sediments from the collision of the Indian and Eurasian plates. The flysch zone consists of alternate areas of peridotites, sandy shales, and dolomites, covered by gravel terraces. The mountain itself consists of thick conglomerate rocks sitting on granite. The visible part of the conglomerates extend from 4,700 m (15,400 ft) to the top with the base located deeper in the mountain.

=== Climate ===
Weather conditions are fairly dry during April to June with daytime temperatures ranging from 5 to 17 °C (41 to 63 °F) and nighttime temperatures ranging from 0 to 6 °C (32 to 43 °F). From October, temperatures begin to drop, leading to harsh winters with daytime temperatures ranging from −4 to 0 °C (25 to 32 °F) and nighttime lows plunging to −20 °C (−4 °F), with January being the coldest month. Monsoons bring precipitation and cold winds from late June to August.

Global warming is described as happening three times faster (by about 0.3 C per decade) on the Tibetan Plateau than the global average with lesser snowfall in the winter. Locals observe that the microclimate around Mount Kailash has experienced noticeably milder winters. Retreating glaciers and thawing permafrost in the Tibet region pose potential risk to the region’s water resources. These effects, along with population growth and tourism, has put severe stress on the fragile ecosystem around Mount Kailash.

The intergovernmental organisation International Centre for Integrated Mountain Development (ICIMOD) is involved in a trans boundary project called the Kailash Sacred Landscape Conservation and Development Initiative in the region around Mount Kailash. The organization is involved in ongoing efforts to generate climate data, and to devise sustainable ways of life for the people of the region.

== Mountaineering ==
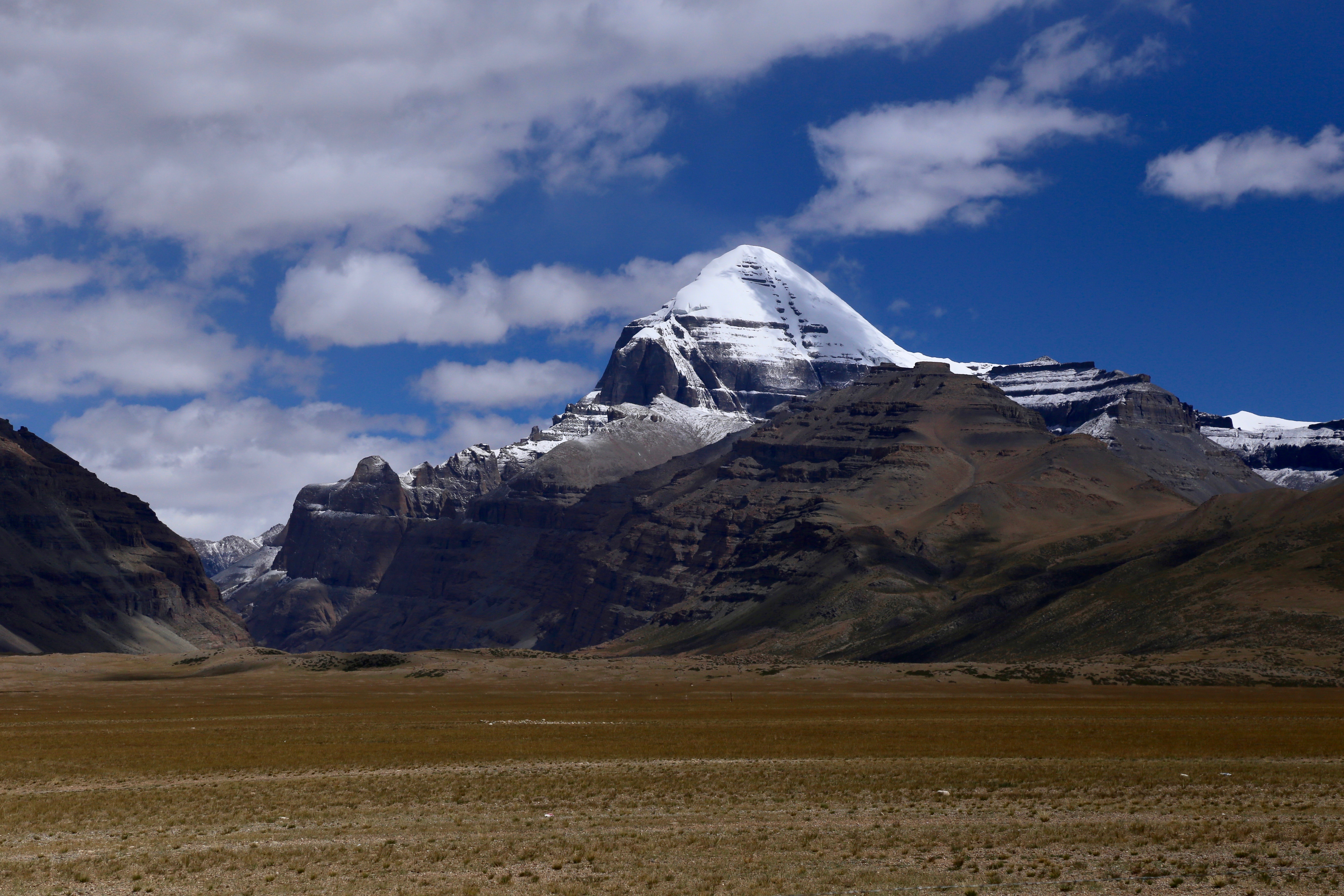
Mount Kailash from the south

In 1926, Hugh Ruttledge, the deputy commissioner of Almora, visited the area to meet the Garpön (local Tibetan leader) of Ngari. As the Garpön was away, he circumambulated Mount Kailash while studying it. According to Ruttledge, the mountain was about 6,000 m (20,000 ft) high and utterly unclimbable. He had thought about an ascent along the northeast ridge and had been exploring the area with Colonel R. C. Wilson, who was on the other side of the mountain with a Sherpa named Tseten. Wilson wrote that Tseten told him that the southeast ridge represented a feasible route to the summit. Wilson explained that although they attempted to climb the mountain, they ran into heavy snowfall, making the ascent impossible.

Herbert Tichy visited the area in 1936, attempting to climb the mountain. When he asked the local people whether Kailash was climbable, a Garpön replied: "Only a man entirely free of sin could climb Kailash. And he wouldn't have to actually scale the sheer walls of ice to do it — he'd just turn himself into a bird and fly to the summit". Italian mountaineer Reinhold Messner was given the opportunity by the Chinese government to climb the mountain in the mid-1980s, but he reportedly declined, saying "If we conquer this mountain, then we conquer something in people's souls. I would suggest they go and climb something a little harder." In 2001, permission was denied to a Spanish team, who requested to climb the peak. Chinese authorities stated that any climbing activities on Mount Kailash were strictly prohibited. To date, there have been no known successful ascents of the mountain.

== Religious significance ==
Mount Kailash is considered sacred in Buddhism, Bon, Hinduism, and Jainism.

=== Buddhism and Bon ===
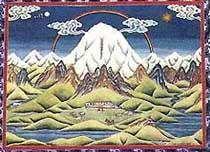
A Thangka depiction of Mount Kailash

Buddhist texts describe Mount Kailash (Kailasa) as the mythological Mount Meru. Kailash is central to its cosmology, and a major pilgrimage site for some Buddhist traditions. In Buddhism, Kailash represents the father of the world and Lake Manasarovar symbolizes the mother. Numerous sites in the region are associated with Padmasambhava, who is credited with establishing Tantric Buddhism in Tibet in the 8th century CE. Vajrayana Buddhists believe that saint Milarepa (c. 1052 – c. 1135) had a challenge with Naro Böncham, a follower of Bön religion of Tibet. The two engaged in a battle of wits with neither able to gain a decisive advantage. Finally, it was agreed that whoever could reach the summit of Kailash first would be the victor. While Naro sat on his magic drum to climb up the slope, Milarepa reached the summit riding on the rays of the Sun, thus winning the contest. He also gave the nearby mountain, since known as Bönri bequeathing it to Bön.

For the Bon people, the mountain is the abode of sky goddess Sipaimen and the mountain was the centre of the ancient Bon empire of Zhang Zhung. According to Tibetan beliefs, the mountain was the centre of the universe Mandala and the source of the mythical Lion, Horse, Peacock, and Elephant Rivers which flowed in the four cardinal directions.

=== Hinduism ===
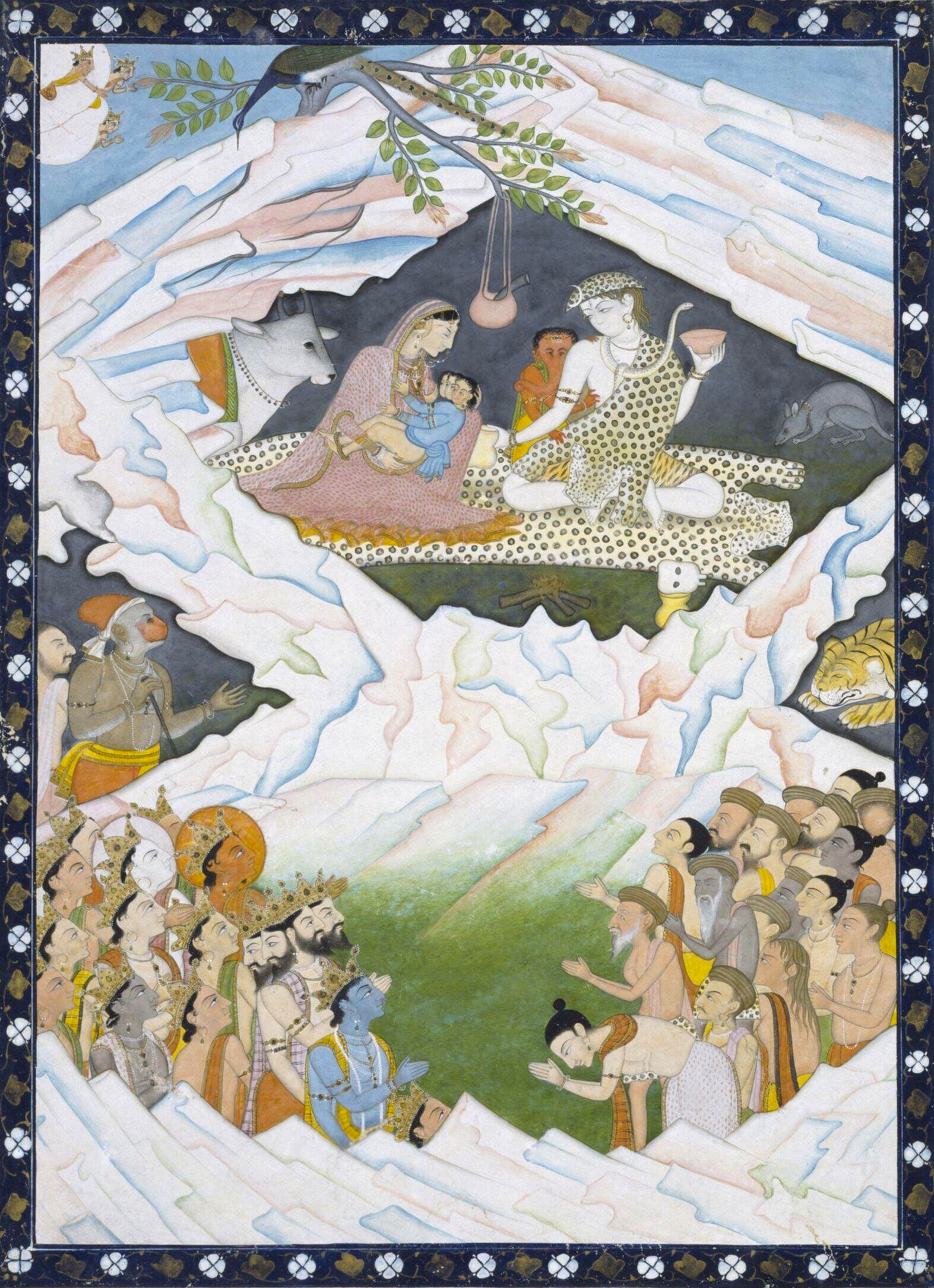
An illustration depicting the Hindu holy family of Shiva at Kailasha (c.1810-1820)

In Hindu art and literature, the mountain is described as the abode of Shiva, who is depicted as residing there along with his consort Parvati and their children, Ganesha and Kartikeya. In early Hindu depictions, Kailash was described as one of the mountains in the Himalayas. In Hindu mythology, Mount Meru is considered as a stairway to heaven, where the devas reside and the Vishnu Purana states that it lies in the center of the world surrounded by six mountain ranges similar to a lotus, one of which is the Himalayas. In the later Hindu theology, Kailash came to be identified with Meru. Shiva is described as sitting in a lotus position, engaged in meditation within the confines of the mountain. Kailash and Manasarovar are mentioned in the Hindu epics Ramayana and Mahabharata. According to the Hindu scriptures and sculptural depictions, the demon-king Ravana shook the mountain after he was refused entry to Kailash. This enraged Shiva, who pressed his toe upon the mountain, trapping Ravana in between. Ravana sang hymns in praise of Shiva for a thousand years before he was released. This representation of Shiva is also referred to as Ravananugraha (meaning "form showing favour to Ravana").

=== Jainism ===
According to Jain scriptures, Rishabhadeva, the first Tirthankar of Jainism attained moksha (liberation) on Mount Kailash. It is believed by Jains that after Rishabhadeva attained moksha, his son emperor Bharata Chakravartin, after whom India was named Bhāratvarsha, had constructed three stupas and twenty four shrines of the 24 tirthankaras in the region with their idols studded with precious stones and named it Sinhnishdha. He also performed a fortnight of worship termed Mahamaga and attained moksha from Kailash. Large pits were dug around the mountain later and the River Ganges was made to flow through it. The 24th and the last Tirthankara, Mahavira, was taken to the summit of Meru by Indra shortly after his birth, after putting his mother into deep slumber. There he was anointed with precious unctions.

== Pilgrimage ==
Due to its sacredness to various religions, people undertake a pilgrimage called yatra to the mountain. While it is not known when the first pilgrimage started, it is one of the oldest pilgrimage routes, which has been in existence for many years.

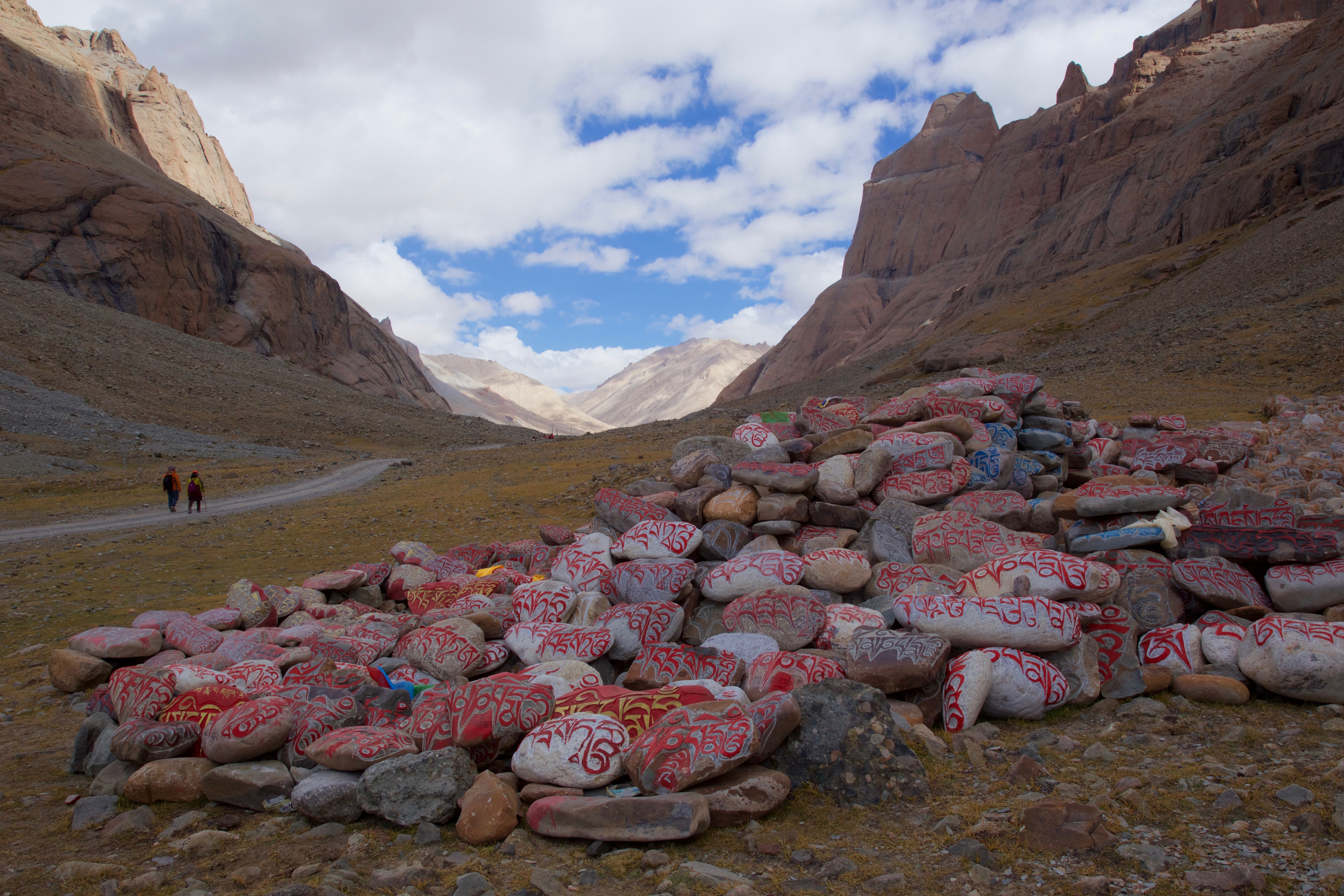
Mani stones on the path around Mount Kailash

Pilgrimage to the mountain increased in the 1930s but was affected later due to both China and the British Empire claiming the region. Religious pilgrimages to Mount Kailas and Manasarovar were permitted by China after its occupation of Tibet in 1950-51. While pilgrimage from India was guaranteed by the 1954 Sino-Indian Agreement, access was restricted after the subsequent 1959 Tibetan uprising and the borders were closed after the Sino-Indian War in 1962. After nearly two decades, pilgrimage from India was allowed in 1981 after an agreement between the governments of India and China. The pilgrimage was suspended for three years since 2020 due to the COVID-19 pandemic. The route was re-opened in 2023 with new regulations.

Since the reopening of the pilgrimage route from India in 1981, the numbers of pilgrims going on the annual yatra has grown considerably. Before the closure in 2020, several thousand pilgrims from India were going to this pilgrimage every year. Since 2015, aspiring pilgrims from India were required to apply in advance to the Ministry of External Affairs and specific number of passes were issued to pilgrims by computerized random selection with preference given to first timers. In India, the pilgrimage is organized by the Government of India and is permitted between June and September. Pilgrims from India travel through two routes opened for the purpose with border crossings at Lipu Lekh pass in Uttarakhand and the Nathu La pass in Sikkim. Since 2020, a motorable road is available till the Lipu Lekh pass through the Indian side of the Mahakali valley, before crossing over to China. The Nathu La route was opened in 2015 and involves traveling to Gangtok before crossing the Nathu La pass into China.

Since 2015, the pilgrimage from Nepal is commonly undertaken via the Humla district in northwestern Nepal. The April 2015 Nepal Earthquake resulted in the closure of the border crossing at Tatopani-Zangmu. Pilgrims also pray to Mount Kailash from within Nepal where it is visible from the Lapcha La pass above the Limi valley on a clear day. Another route exists through the crossing at Rasuwa-Gyirong. Pilgrims could reach Lhasa by air before the journey to Lake Manasarovar or Darchen.

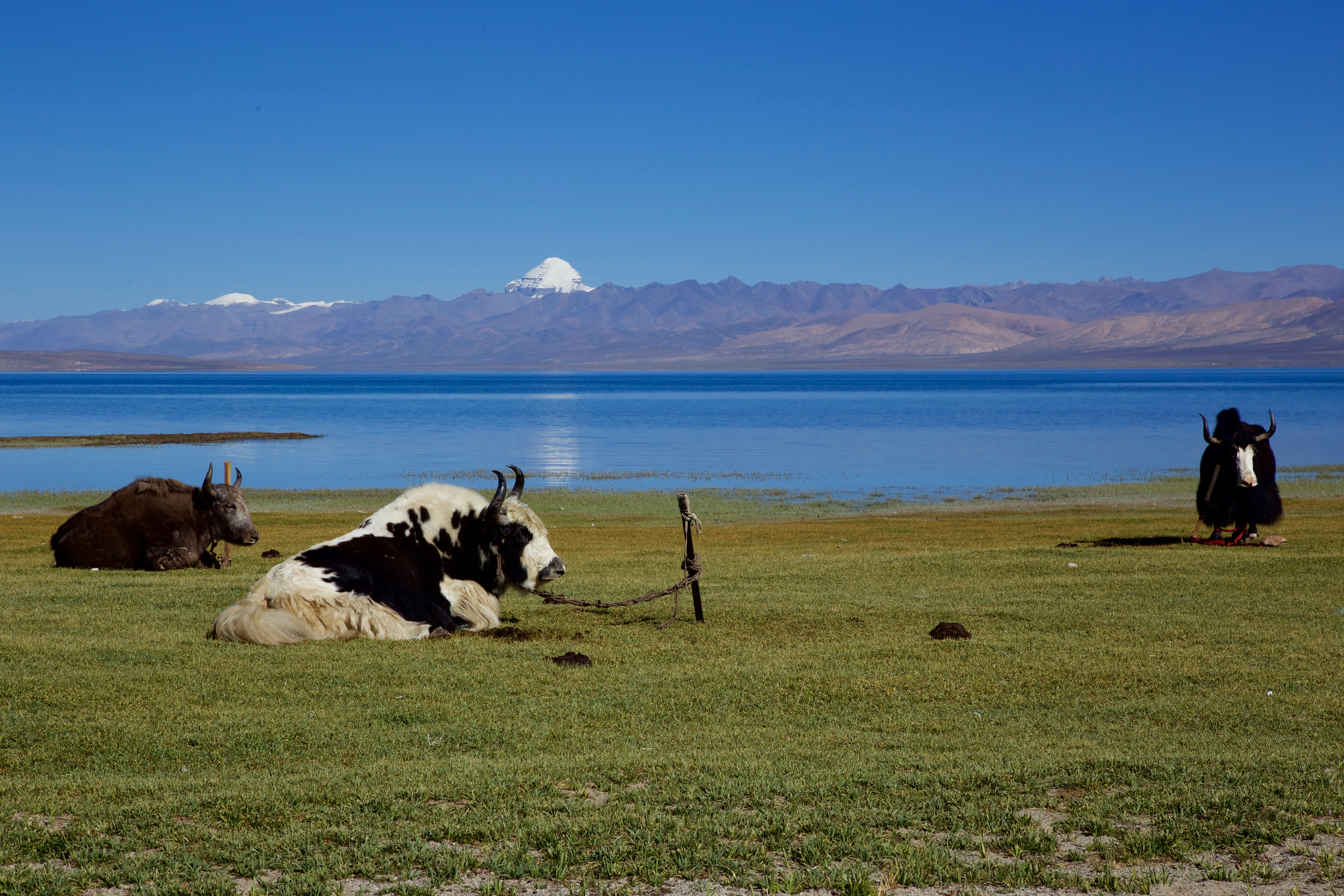
Yaks used in the pilgrimage to Mount Kailash on the banks of Lake Manasarovar

The pilgrimage involves trekking towards Lake Manasarovar and a circumambulation of Mount Kailash. The path around Mount Kailash is 53 km (33 mi) long. The circumambulation is made in a clockwise direction by Hindus, Buddhists, and Jains, while Bönpos circumambulate the mountain in a counterclockwise direction. The circumambulation usually begins and ends at Darchen, a small outpost located at an elevation of 4,670 m (15,320 ft) with the highest point at the Drölma pass situated at 5,650 m (18,540 ft). Trekking around the mountain can be done on foot with support from a pony or domestic yak. The circumambulation takes three days on average with the first day trek from Darchen to Dirapuk gompa for about 14 km (8.7 mi), followed by a journey from Dirpauk to Zutulphuk via the Drölma pass for 19 km (12 mi) on the second day and the final trek back to Darchen on the last day. The most extreme method of doing the circumambulation (called Kora) in Tibetan Buddhism is performed by doing full body-length prostrations over the entire stretch around the mountain. The pilgrim bends down, kneels, prostrates full-length, makes a mark with her fingers, rises to her knees, prays, and then crawls forward on hands and knees to the mark made by her fingers before repeating the process. With this method, the pilgrimage takes three weeks on average to complete.

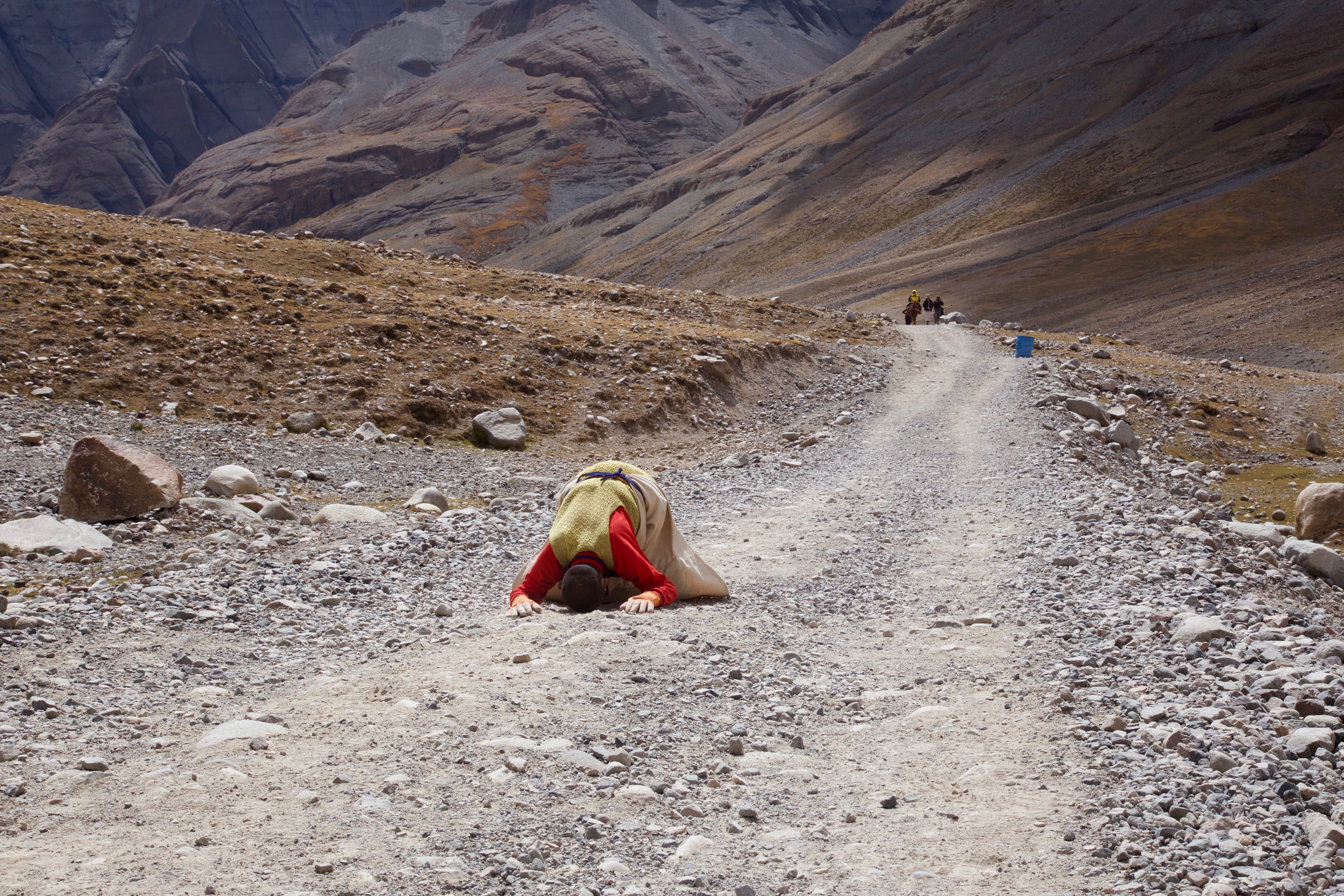
A Tibetan pilgrim on the Kailash kora (circumambulation)

Pilgrims believe that doing a circumambulation of Mount Kailash is a spiritually beneficial practice that can bring various positive effects, such as the cleansing of one's sins. Each circumambulation is considered to have fulfilled a life-death cycle. There are many stupas, flag poles, Buddhist monasteries and praying stations along the route. Many of the cultural artifacts along the route were destroyed during the Cultural Revolution of China from 1966 to 1976. Hindus take a ritual bath in the Manasarovar before doing a circumambulation. The Hindu text Skanda Purana states that "There are no mountains like the Himalaya, for in them are Kailas and Manasarovar. As the dew is dried up by the morning Sun, so are the sins of mankind dried up by the sight of the Himalaya."

Tibetan Buddhist pilgrims often chant Om mani padme hum (jewel in the lotus) and sing nyelu songs while crossing the Dolma La pass, which are believed to proclaim a fraternity amongst all pilgrims who cross paths on a Kailash pilgrimage. As the mountain is located in a remote area of the Himalayas, very few facilities exist to aid during the pilgrimage. For varied reasons for the different faiths that revere the mountain, setting foot on the slopes of the mountain or attempting to climb it is forbidden by law.

== See also ==
- Adi Kailash – Mountain in Uttarakhand, India
- Gurla Mandhata – Mountain in Tibet, China
- Kailash: A Journal of Himalayan Studies
- Kinnaur Kailash – Mountain peak in Kinnaur district
- Kunlun (mythology) – Mountain in Chinese mythology
- Manimahesh Kailash – Mountain in Bharmour, Chamba, Himachal Pradesh, India
- Om Parvat – Mountain in the Himalayan mountain range
- Sacred mountains – Mountains central to certain religions
- Shrikhand Kailash – Religious mountain track in Kullu, Himachal Pradesh, India

== Bibliography ==
- Albinia, Alice (2008). Empires of the Indus: The Story of a River. John Murray. ISBN 978-0-71956-003-3.
- Allen, Charles (1982). A Mountain in Tibet: The Search for Mount Kailas and the Sources of the Great Rivers of Asia. Futura Publications. ISBN 978-0-70882-411-5.
- Allen, Charles (2013). A Mountain in Tibet: The Search for Mount Kailas and the Sources of the Great Rivers of Asia. Abacus. ISBN 978-1-40552-497-1. Archived from the original on 20 August 2024.
- Archer, W. G. (1973). Indian paintings from the Punjab Hills: a survey and history of Pahari miniature painting. Oxford University Press. ISBN 978-0-85667-002-2.
- Batchelor, Stephen (1987). The Tibet Guide. Wisdom Publications. ISBN 978-0-86171-046-1. Archived from the original on 20 August 2024.
- Bernbaum, Edwin (2022). Sacred Mountains of the World. Cambridge University Press. ISBN 978-1-10883-474-2. Archived from the original on 20 August 2024.
- Berreman, Gerald Duane (1972). Hindus of the Himalayas: Ethnography and Change. University of California Press. ISBN 978-0-52001-423-7. Archived from the original on 20 August 2024.
- Brockman, Norbert (2011). Encyclopedia of Sacred Places, Volume 1. ABC-Clio. ISBN 978-1-59884-654-6. Archived from the original on 19 August 2024.
- Bubriski, Kevin; Pandey, Abhimanyu (2018). Kailash Yatra: a Long Walk to Mount Kailash through Humla (PDF). Penguin Random House. ISBN 978-0-67009-111-9. Archived (PDF) from the original on 5 July 2024.
- Buswell, Robert (2004). Encyclopedia of Buddhism: A-L. Macmillan Publishers. ISBN 978-0-02865-719-6. Archived from the original on 20 August 2024.
- Chamaria, Pradeep (1996). Kailash Manasarovara on the Rugged Road to Revelation. Abhinav Publications. ISBN 978-8-17017-336-6.
- Dallapiccola, Anna L. (2003). "Ravananugrahamurti". Dictionary of Hindu Lore and Legend. London, UK: Thames & Hudson. ISBN 978-0-50051-088-9.
- Das, Sarat Chandra (1902). Tibetan-English Dictionary with Sanskrit Synonyms. Bengal Secretariat Book Depot.
- DiBiasio, Jame (2013). The Story of Angkor. Silkworm Books. ISBN 978-1-63102-259-3. Archived from the original on 20 August 2024.
- Flood, Gavin (1996). An Introduction to Hinduism. Cambridge University Press. ISBN 978-0-52143-878-0.
- Govinda, Anagarika (1966). The Way of the White Clouds: A Buddhist Pilgrim in Tibet. Shambhala Publications. ISBN 978-0-87773-007-1.
- Gyatso, Tenzing (2022). The Fourteenth Dalai Lama's Stages of the Path, Volume 1. Wisdom Publications. ISBN 978-1-61429-793-2. Archived from the original on 20 August 2024.
- Heller, Amy; Orofino, Giacomella; Ramble, Charles (2003). Discoveries in Western Tibet and the Western Himalayas. Brill Publishers. ISBN 978-9-00415-520-6. Archived from the original on 20 August 2024.
- Henry, Justin W. (2022). Ravana's Kingdom: The Ramayana and Sri Lankan History from Below. Oxford University Press. ISBN 978-0-19763-630-5. Archived from the original on 20 August 2024.
- Honour, Hugh; Fleming, John (2005). A World History of Art. Laurence King. ISBN 978-1-85669-451-3. Archived from the original on 20 August 2024.
- Huber, Toni; Rigzin, Tsepak (1999). "A Tibetan Guide for Pilgrimage to Ti-se and mTsho Ma-pham". Sacred Spaces and Powerful Places in Tibetan Culture: A Collection of Essays (PDF). Library of Tibetan Works and Archives. ISBN 978-8-18647-022-0. Archived (PDF) from the original on 19 August 2024.
- Jain, Arun Kumar (2009). Faith & Philosophy of Jainism. Kalpaz Publications. ISBN 978-8-17835-723-2. Archived from the original on 20 August 2024.
- Johnson, Russell; Kerry Moran (1989). The Sacred Mountain of Tibet: On Pilgrimage to Kailas. Park Street Press. ISBN 978-0-89281-325-4.
- Jones, Constance; Ryan, James (2006). Encyclopedia of Hinduism. Facts On File. ISBN 978-0-81607-564-5. Archived from the original on 20 October 2022.
- Likens, Gene (2009). Encyclopedia of Inland Waters. Elsevier Science. ISBN 978-0-12370-626-3. Archived from the original on 20 August 2024.
- Likens, Gene (2010). Lake Ecosystem Ecology: A Global Perspective. Elsevier Science. ISBN 978-0-12382-003-7. Archived from the original on 20 August 2024.
- Macfarlane, Robert (2012). The Old Ways: A Journey on Foot. Penguin Books. ISBN 978-0-241-14553-1. Archived from the original on 19 August 2024.
- McKay, Alex (2015). Kailas Histories: Renunciate Traditions and the Construction of Himalayan Sacred Geography. Brill Publishers. ISBN 978-9-00430-618-9. Archived from the original on 20 August 2024.
- McNeely, Scott (2018). Ultimate Book of Adventure: Life-Changing Excursions and Experiences Around the World. Chronicle Books. ISBN 978-1-45216-425-0. Archived from the original on 20 August 2024.
- Rai, Champat (1929). Riṣabha Deva, the Founder of Jainism. Indian Press. Archived from the original on 20 August 2024.
- Rajan, K.V.; Thakuir, Atul (2024). Kathmandu Chronicle:Reclaiming India–Nepal Relations. Penguin Random House. ISBN 978-9-35708-708-7. Archived from the original on 20 August 2024.
- Rangaswamy, M. A. Dorai (1990) [1958]. Religion and Philosophy of Tevaram (PDF). University of Madras. Archived (PDF) from the original on 20 August 2024.
- Samkar, Nyima (2020). Mount Kailash: the White Mirror. Library of Tibetan Works and Archives. ISBN 978-9-38702-385-7. Archived from the original on 20 August 2024.
- Shah, Umakant (1987). Jaina-rūpa-maṇḍana. Abhinav Publications. ISBN 978-8-17017-208-6.
- Snelling, John (1983). The Sacred Mountain:Travellers and Pilgrims at Mount Kailas in Western Tibet, and the Great Universal Symbol of the Mountain. East West Publishing. ISBN 978-0-85692-111-7. Archived from the original on 20 August 2024.
- Thubron, Colin (2011). To a Mountain in Tibet. Chatto & Windus. ISBN 978-0-70118-380-6. Archived from the original on 20 August 2024.
- Thurman, Robert; Wise, Tad (1999). Circling the Sacred Mountain: A Spiritual Adventure Through the Himalayas. Bantam Books. ISBN 978-0-55337-850-4.
- Vinding, Michael (1998). The Thakali: A Himalayan Ethnography. Serindia Publications. ISBN 978-0-90602-650-2. Archived from the original on 20 August 2024.
- Welch, Stuart Cary (1985). India: Art and Culture, 1300-1900. Metropolitan Museum of Art. ISBN 978-0-03006-114-1. Archived from the original on 20 August 2024.
- Wolpert, Stanley (1994). An Introduction to India. Penguin Books. ISBN 978-0-14016-870-9.
- Zimmer, Heinrich (1946). Myths and Symbols in Indian Art and Civilization. Pantheon Books. ISBN 978-0-69101-778-5.
- Zomer, Robert; Oli, Krishna Prasad (2011). Kailash Sacred Landscape Conservation Initiative: Feasibility Assessment Report (PDF). International Centre for Integrated Mountain Development. Archived (PDF) from the original on 20 August 2024.
