= Susīma (deity) =

- Sanskrit: सुसीम; Susīma
- Pāli: सुसीम; Susīma
- Chinese: 須深天子 (Pinyin: Xūshēn Tiānzǐ) 須尸摩天子 (Pinyin: Xūshīmó Tiānzǐ) 須深摩 (Pinyin: Xūshēnmó)
- Japanese: 須深天子(しゅじんてんし) (romaji: Shujin Tenshi) 須尸摩天子(すしまてんし) (romaji: Sushima Tenshi) 須深摩(しゅじんま) (romaji: Shujinma)
- Korean: 수심 천자 (RR: Susim Cheonja) 수시마 (RR: Susima) 수심마 (RR: Susimma)
- Sinhala: සුසීම දෙව්පුත් (susīma devput)
- Thai: สุสิมเทพบุตร (su sim thepphabut)
- Tibetan: མཚམས་བཟངས་ Wylie: mtshams bzangs
- Vietnamese: Tu Thi Ma; Tu Thâm Thiên tử

Information
- Venerated by: Theravada, Mahayana, Vajrayana

Susīma is a devaputra in Buddhism.

He is said to be one of the one thousand sons of Shakra. His name has also been translated into English as Excellent Rule.

== Theravada ==
The Pali Canon includes two suttas that reference the deity, both called the Susīma Sutta (SN 2.29 and SN 11.2).

The first sutta recounts an episode when the Buddha asked his disciple Ānanda how he felt about Sāriputta. When the former provided an account of the latter's good qualities, Susīma approached the Buddha with an assembly of deities. After properly greeting him, the young deva repeated Ānanda's praises, adding that among the gods, the same praises may be heard. The assembly radiated a rainbow of colors in response to Susīma's words.

Susīma then spoke in verse:

He’s considered to be an astute person,
Sāriputta, free of anger.
Few in wishes, sweet, tamed,
the hermit shines in the Teacher’s praise!

The Buddha responded:

He’s considered to be an astute person,
Sāriputta, free of anger.
Few in wishes, sweet, tamed;
developed and well-tamed, he bides his time.

The second sutta begins with the Buddha informing his disciples about the battle between the devas and the asuras. He explains that Sakka appealed to Susīma to join in the fight against the asuras. When Susīma fell into negligence, the two gods speak to each other in verse about laziness. The Buddha concludes the sermon by reminding the monks of the virtue of applying effort and initiative.

== Mahayana ==
In the Chinese Buddhist canon, Susīma appears in the Mūlasarvāstivāda Saṃyukta Āgama (SA 1306) and the partial Saṃyukta Āgama (SA-2 305) of uncertain school affiliation, where his name is transliterated as; 須深摩 or 須深天子, and 須尸摩天子; respectively. Both of these sutras generally correspond in content to SN 2.29 of the Pali Canon.

The deity also appears briefly in several Mahayana Sutras, including:

- Māyopamasamādhi Sūtra (觀世音菩薩授記經) (where his name is translated as 善界天子)
- Saṃvṛtiparamārthasatyanirdeśa Sūtra
- Suṣṭhitamatidevaputraparipṛcchā Sūtra (如幻三昧經, T 0342).
- Ratnajāli Paripṛcchā Sūtra (佛說寶網經, T 0433)
- Mañjuśrīvikurvāṇa Parivarta Sūtra (佛説魔逆經, T 0589)
- Sutra of the One-Syllable Wheel-Turning Ruler Spoken at the Seat of Enlightenment (菩提場所説一字頂輪王經, T 0950)
