= Mount Meru (Buddhism) =

Central world-mountain in Buddhist cosmology

Translations of Mount Meru
- English: Wonderful Meru
- Khmer: ភ្នំព្រះសុមេរុ (Phnom Preah So Mae)

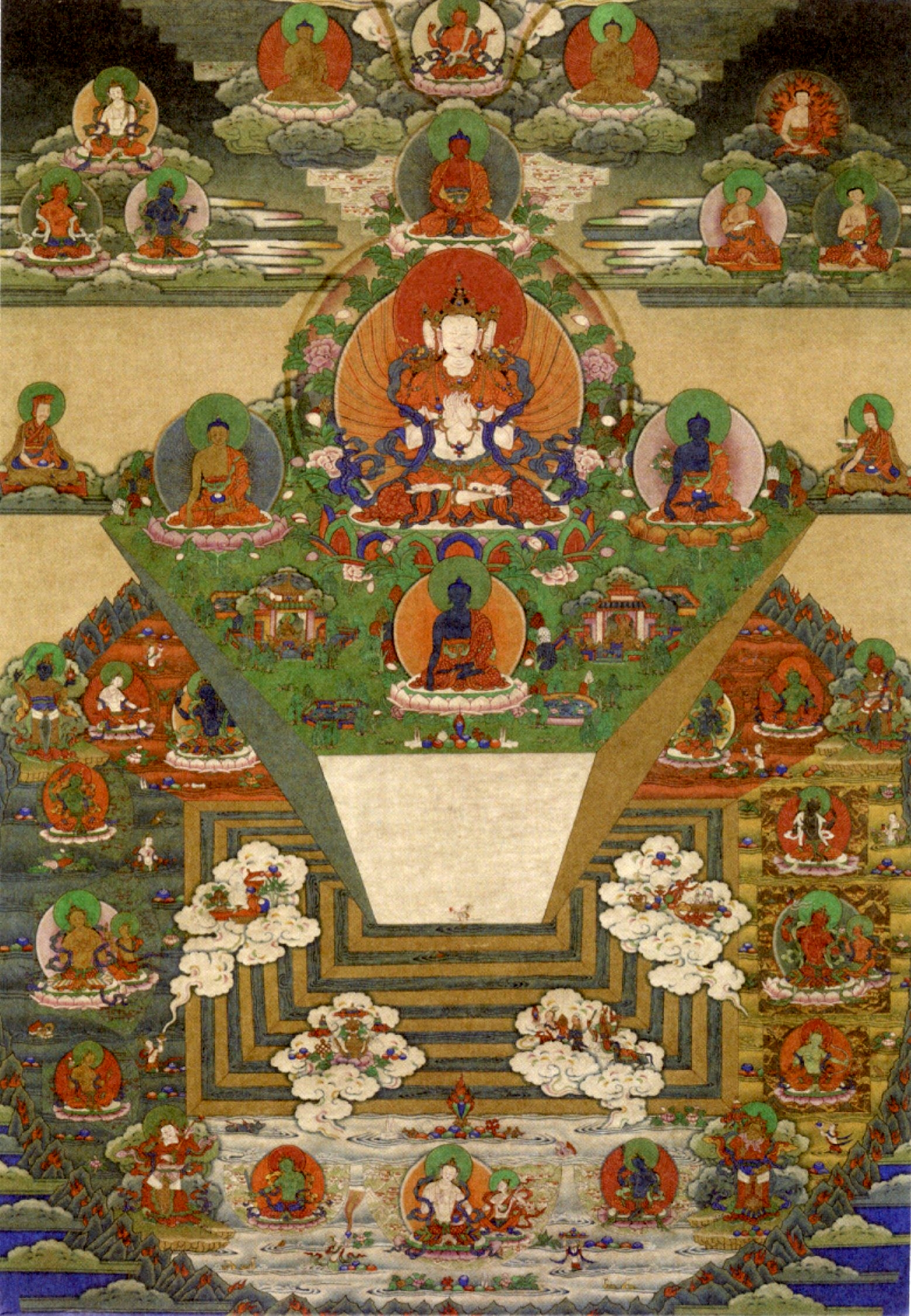
Bhutanese thangka of Mount Meru and the Buddhist universe, 19th century, Trongsa Dzong, Trongsa, Bhutan

Mount Meru (also Sumeru (Sanskrit) or Sineru (Pāli) or Kangrinboqe/Kailash) is the name of the central world-mountain in Buddhist cosmology. Etymologically, the proper name of the mountain is Meru (Pāli Meru), to which is added the approbatory prefix su-, resulting in the meaning "excellent Meru" or "wonderful Meru".

The concept of Sumeru is closely related to the central Mount Meru of Hindu cosmology, but it differs from the Hindu concept in several particulars.

== Characteristics ==
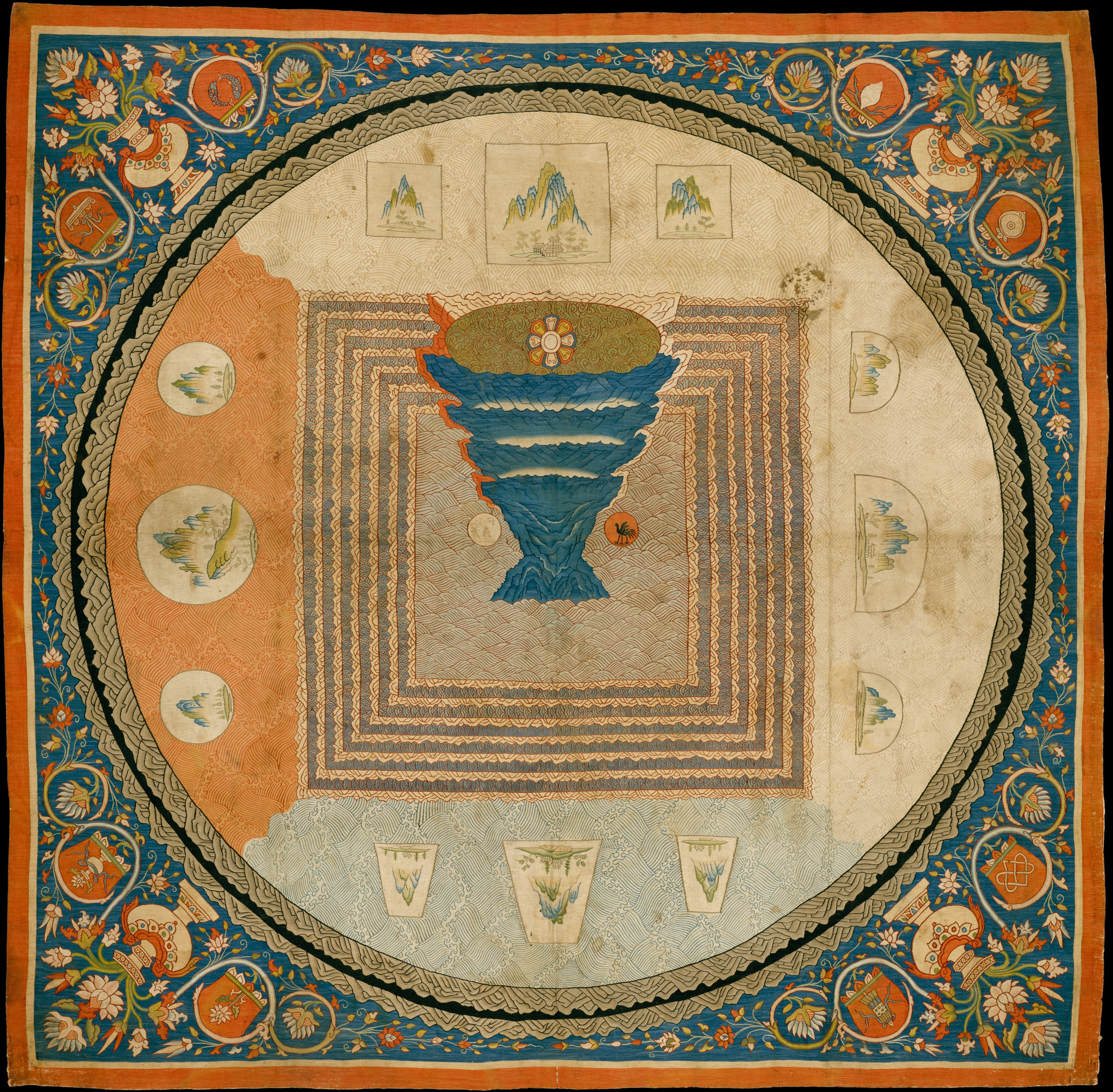
Yuan dynasty (1271–1368) Chinese mandala depicting Mount Meru as an inverted pyramid topped by a lotus.

According to Vasubandhu's Abhidharmakośabhāṣyam (philosophical writings), Sumeru is 80,000 yojanas tall. The exact measure of one yojana is uncertain, but some accounts put it at about 24,000 feet, or approximately 4-1/2 miles, but other accounts put it at about 7-9 miles. It also descends beneath the surface of the surrounding waters to a depth of 80,000 yojanas, being founded upon the basal layer of Earth. Sumeru is often used as a simile for both size and stability in Buddhist texts.

Sumeru is said to be shaped like an hourglass, with a top and base of 80,000 yojanas square, but narrowing in the middle (i.e., at a height of 40,000 yojanas) to 20,000 yojanas square.

Sumeru is the polar center of a mandala-like complex of seas and mountains. The square base of Sumeru is surrounded by a square moat-like ocean, which is in turn surrounded by a ring (or rather square) wall of mountains, which is in turn surrounded by a sea, each diminishing in width and height from the one closer to Sumeru. There are seven seas and seven surrounding mountain-walls, until one comes to the vast outer sea which forms most of the surface of the world, in which the known continents are merely small islands. The known world, which is on the continent of Jambudvipa, is directly south of Sumeru.

The dimensions stated in the Abhidharmakośabhāṣyam are shown in the table below:

Name	Width	Height/Depth
Sumeru (Sineru) mountain	80,000 yojanas	80,000 yojanas
Sea	80,000 yojanas	80,000 yojanas
Yugandhara mountains	40,000 yojanas	40,000 yojanas
Sea	40,000 yojanas	40,000 yojanas
Iṣadhara (Isadhara) mountains	20,000 yojanas	20,000 yojanas
Sea	20,000 yojanas	20,000 yojanas
Khadiraka (Karavīka) mountains	10,000 yojanas	10,000 yojanas
Sea	10,000 yojanas	10,000 yojanas
Sudarśana (Sudassana) mountains	5,000 yojanas	5,000 yojanas
Sea	5,000 yojanas	5,000 yojanas
Aśvakarṇa (Assakaṇṇa) mountains	2,500 yojanas	2,500 yojanas
Sea	2,500 yojanas	2,500 yojanas
Vinadhara (Vinataka) mountains	1,250 yojanas	1,250 yojanas
Sea	1,250 yojanas	1,250 yojanas
Nimindhara (Nemindhara) mountains	625 yojanas	625 yojanas
Outer Sea	32,000 yojanas	relatively shallow
Cakravāḍa (Cakkavāḷa) mountains (circular edge of the world)	312.5 yojanas	312.5 yojanas

The 80,000 yojana square top of Sumeru constitutes the Trāyastriṃśa "heaven" (devaloka), which is the highest plane in direct physical contact with the earth. The next 40,000 yojanas below this heaven consist of sheer precipice, narrowing in like an inverted mountain until it is 20,000 yojanas square at a height of 40,000 yojanas above the sea.

From this point Sumeru expands again, going down in four terraced ledges, each broader than the one above. The first terrace constitutes the "heaven" of the Four Great Kings and is divided into four parts, facing north, south, east and west. Each section is governed by one of the Four Great Kings, who faces outward toward the quarter of the world that he supervises.

40,000 yojanas is also the height at which the Sun and Moon circle Sumeru in a clockwise direction. This rotation explains the alteration of day and night; when the Sun is north of Sumeru, the shadow of the mountain is cast over the continent of Jambudvīpa, and it is night there; at the same time it is noon in the opposing northern continent of Uttarakuru, dawn in the eastern continent of Pūrvavideha, and dusk in the western continent of Aparagodānīya. Half a day later, when the Sun has moved to the south, it is noon in Jambudvīpa, dusk in Pūrvavideha, dawn in Aparagodānīya, and midnight in Uttarakuru.

The next three terraces down the slopes of Sumeru are each longer and broader by a factor of two. They contain the followers of the Four Great Kings, namely nāgas, yakṣas, gandharvas, and kumbhāṇḍas.

The names and dimensions of the terraces on the lower slopes of Sumeru are given below:

Name	Height above the sea	Breadth	Length (on one side)
Cāturmahārājika	40,000 yojanas	2,000 yojanas	24,000 yojanas
Sadāmada	30,000 yojanas	4,000 yojanas	32,000 yojanas
Mālādhara	20,000 yojanas	8,000 yojanas	48,000 yojanas
Karoṭapāni	10,000 yojanas	16,000 yojanas	80,000 yojanas

Below Sumeru, in the seas around it, is the abode of the Asuras who are at war with the Trāyastriṃśa gods.

== Abandonment ==
Certain traditional Buddhist ideas about the world are incompatible with modern science and have been abandoned by numerous modern Buddhists. One of the most well known of these ideas is Mount Meru. According to Donald S. Lopez Jr., "the human realm that Buddhist texts describe is a flat earth, or perhaps more accurately a flat ocean, its waters contained by a ring of iron mountains. In that ocean is a great central mountain, surrounded in the four cardinal directions by island continents."

As Lopez notes, as early as the 18th century, Buddhist scholars like Tominaga Nakamoto (1715–1746) began to question this classical Buddhist cosmography, holding that they were adopted by the Buddha from Indian theories, but that they were incidental and thus not at the heart of Buddha's teaching. While some traditional Buddhists did defend the traditional cosmology, others like Shimaji Mokurai (1838–1911) argued that it was not foundational to Buddhism and was merely an element of Indian mythology. Others like Kimura Taiken (1881–1930), went further and argued that this traditional cosmography was not part of original Buddhism.

The issue of Mount Meru was also discussed by modern Buddhist intellectuals like Gendün Chöphel and the 14th Dalai Lama. According to Chöphel, the Meru cosmology is a provisional teaching taught in accord with the ideas of ancient India, but not appropriate for the modern era. Similarly, the 14th Dalai Lama writes that "my own view is that Buddhism must abandon many aspects of the Abhidharma cosmology". The Dalai Lama sees the falsehood of this traditional cosmology as not affecting the core of Buddhism (the teaching of the four noble truths and liberation) since it is "secondary to the account of the nature and origins of sentient beings".

== See also ==
- Pure Land
- Semeru — a mountain in Indonesia, named after Sumeru
- Mandala (Southeast Asian history)

== Sources ==
- Lopez Jr., Donald S. (2009). Buddhism and Science: A Guide for the Perplexed. University of Chicago Press.
