= Hinduism in China =

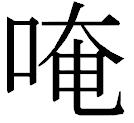
The "Om" symbol in Chinese (Note: 唵 (U+5535))

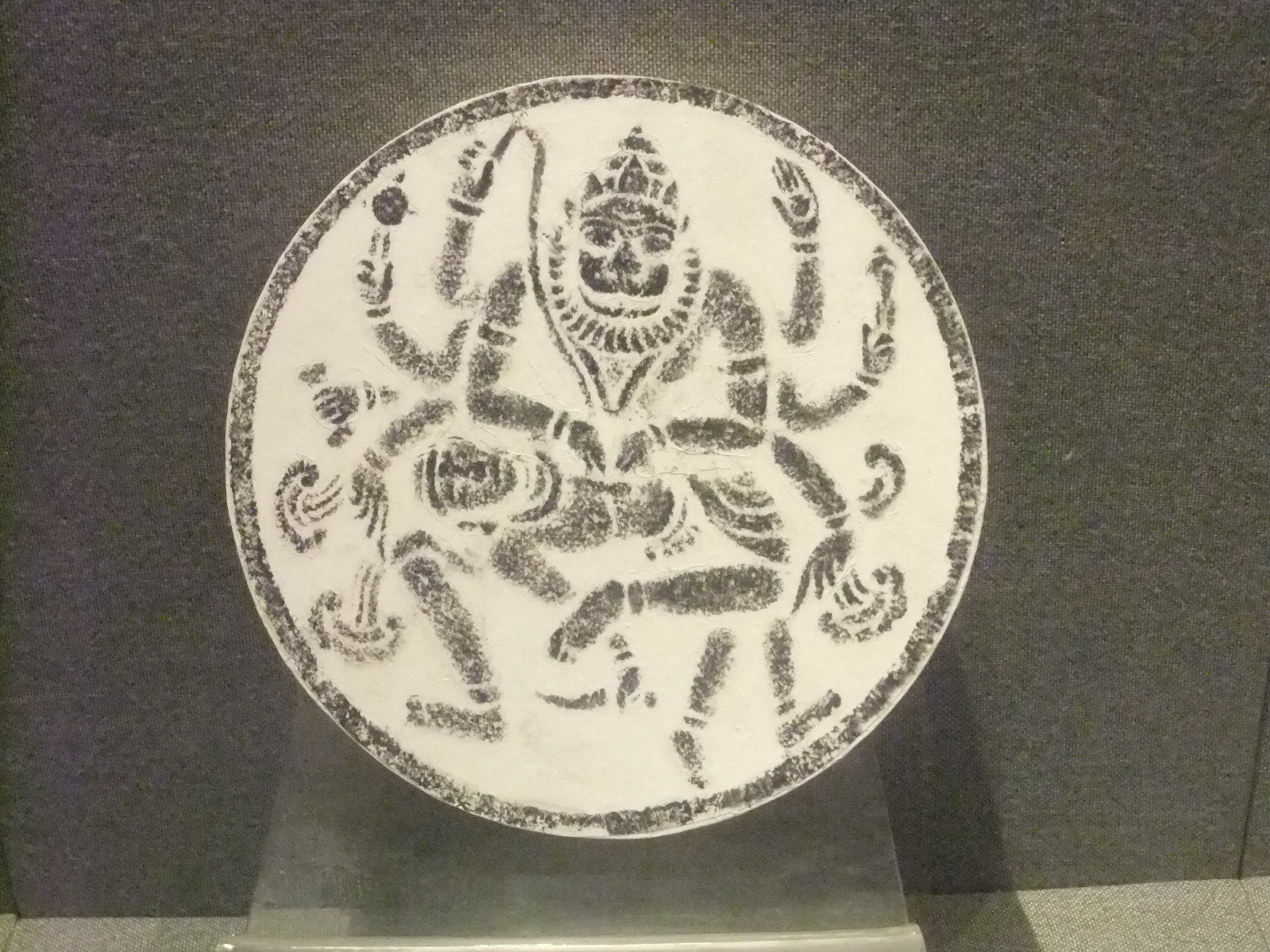
Hindu relief, Quanzhou Museum. The image depicts Narasimha legend for the festival of Holika and Holi.

Hinduism (specifically the yogic school) is currently practiced by a minority of residents of China. The religion itself has a very limited presence in modern mainland China, but archaeological evidence suggests a significant presence of Hinduism in different provinces of medieval China. Hindu influences were also absorbed in to Buddhism and got mixed with Chinese mythology over its history. Practices originating in the Vedic tradition of ancient India such as yoga and meditation are also popular in China. Tibet, a Buddhist territory known as the "roof of the world", is governed as part of China.

Hindu communities, particularly through Tamil merchant guilds of Ayyavole and Manigramam, once thrived in medieval south China. Evidence of Tamil Shiva motifs and temples, such as in the Kaiyuan temple, continued to be discovered in Quanzhou, Fujian, a province of southeast China. A small community of Tamil immigrant workers currently exists in Hong Kong.

== History ==
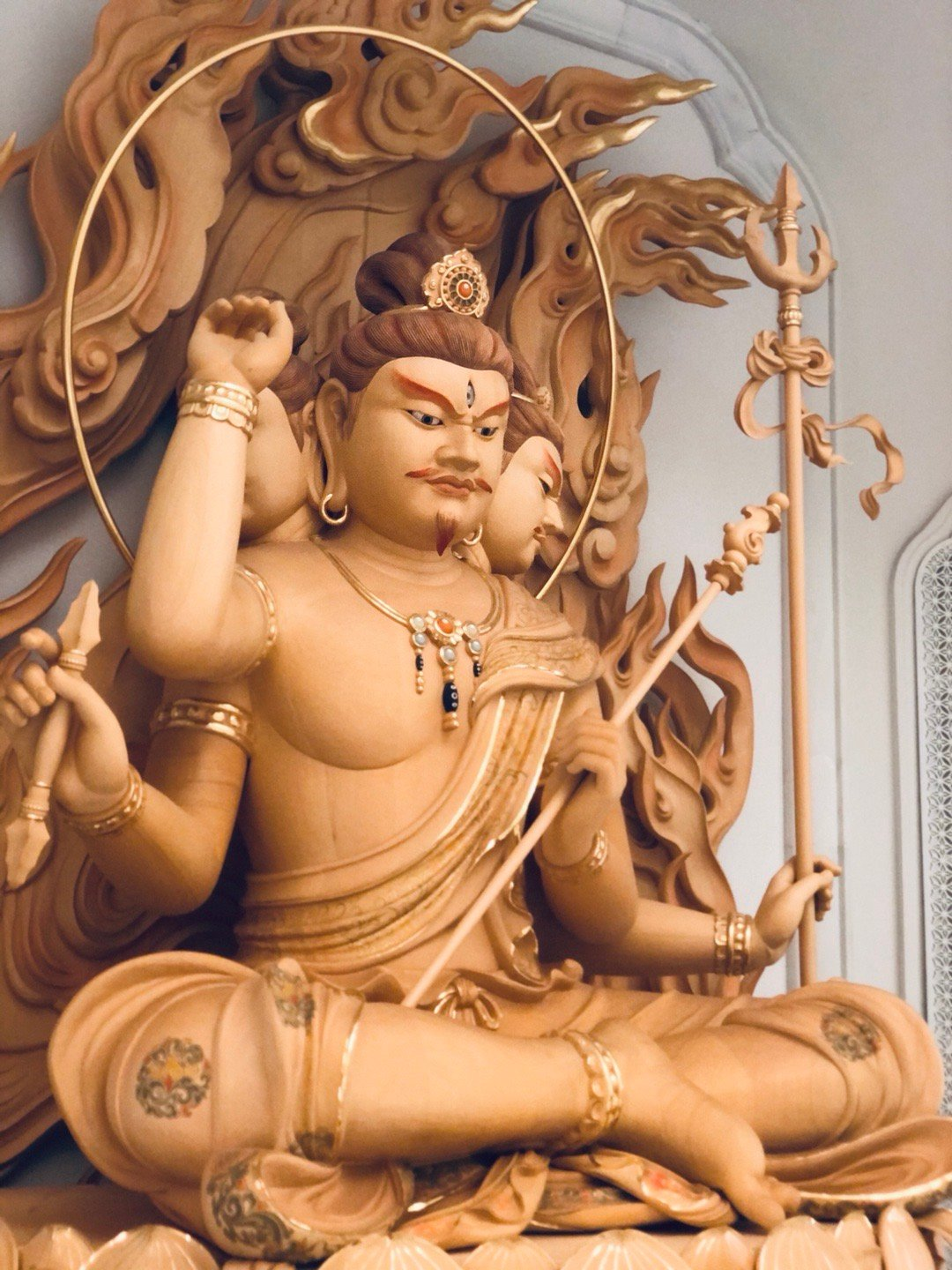
Statue of Dàzìzàitiān (Shiva) in a Chinese Buddhist temple in Putuoshan Guanyin Dharma Realm in Zhejiang, China

Although Hinduism is a little-practiced religion in China, it had a significant, but indirect role in influencing Chinese culture through Buddhist beliefs, practices and traditions (which share a common Dharmic root with Hinduism) which diffused and spread to China from India from the 1st or 2nd century CE onwards. During this influence and synthesis of ideas, some terms were mapped into pre-existing concepts - raksasas as luocha, others terms were introduced - pisacas in Hinduism as pishezuo in Chinese. As a result, traces of Hinduism's influence on Chinese culture can be found in Chinese Buddhism, which has syncretized many Hindu deities within its pantheon. One example is the Chinese Buddhist belief in the Twenty-Four Devas, a grouping of protective dharmapalas of Buddhism. Twenty-one of the devas in the group consists of deities borrowed from Hinduism, including, but not limited to, Dàzìzàitiān (Shiva), Dìshìtiān (Indra), Dàfàntiān (Brahma), Jíxiáng Tiānnǚ (Lakshmi), Biàncáitiān (Saraswati) and Yánmóluówáng (Yama). Statues of the Twenty-Four Devas are enshrined in many Chinese Buddhist temples and monasteries, usually in the Mahavira Hall. Aside from the deities, other beings from Hinduism are also shared in Chinese Buddhist belief, such as the Eight Legions of Devas and Nāgas (Chinese: 天龍八部; Pinyin: Tiānlóngbābù) which includes beings like asuras, mahoragas and kinnaras. Yakshas (Chinese: 夜叉; Pinyin: Yèchā) originally from Hinduism, are a class of nature ghosts or demons in Chinese Buddhism. Belief in the Yaksha made its way to China through the Lotus Sutra, which was originally translated into Chinese by Dharmaraksa around 290 CE, before being superseded by a translation in seven fascicles by Kumārajīva in 406 CE. Garuda, the mount of Vishnu, is also well known as Jiālóuluó (Chinese: 迦楼羅; Pinyin: Jiālóuluó) or The Golden Winged Great Peng (Chinese: 金翅大鵬雕; Pinyin: Jīnchì Dàpéng Diāo). Rakshasas (Chinese: 羅剎; Pinyin: Luóchà) are also well known in Chinese communities as human-eating demons or ghosts. For example, Princess Iron Fan, a demonic antagonist from the popular 16th century novel Journey To The West is described as a rakshasi. Another example is the Lokapālas, who take the form of the Four Heavenly Kings (Chinese: 四大天王; Pinyin: Sìdà Tiānwáng) in China, Taiwan and other Chinese communities. Various bodhisattvas are also described as manifesting in the form of Hindu deities. For example, Mǎtóu Guānyīn (馬頭觀音) is a manifestation of the Bodhisattva Guanyin who takes the form of the horse-headed god Hayagriva. Another manifestation of Guanyin, Zhǔntí Guānyīn (準提觀音), known in English as Cundi, is also considered to be an adaptation of the goddess Chandi, an alternate form of the goddess Parvarti. In another example, the deva or bodhisattva Mólìzhītiān (摩利支天), known in English as Mārīcī, is also identified with Cundi and with Mahēśvarī, the consort of Maheśvara, and therefore also has the title Mātrikā (佛母 Fo mǔ), Mother of the Myriad Buddhas. Many legends and stories in Chinese folk religion, such as Nezha, have been traced to Hindu mythology, such as through the 10th century translations of Tianxizai. Hanuman is also believed by some scholars to be a source for the Chinese mythological character Sun Wukong.

Arthur Waley (1889–1996) while translating Tao Te Ching (The Way and Its Power) commented:

"I see no reason to doubt, that the 'holy mountain-men' (sheng-hsien) described by Lieh Tzu are Indian Rishi; and when we read in Chuang Tzu of certain Taoists who practiced movements very similar to the asanas of Hindu yoga, it is at least a possibility that some knowledge of the yoga technique which these Rishi used had also drifted into China."

Some examples of influence by Hinduism on ancient Chinese religion included the belief of "six schools" or "six doctrines" as well as use of Yoga, stupas (later became pagoda in East Asia). However, in China, Hinduism has never gained much popularity, unlike the beliefs of Buddhism and Confucianism. There were exceptions, such as in parts of Tibet.

There was a small Hindu community in China, mostly situated in southeastern China. A late thirteenth-century bilingual Tamil and Chinese language inscription has been found associated with the remains of a Siva temple of Quanzhou. This was one of possibly two south Indian-style Hindu temples (115) that must have been built in the southeastern sector of the old port, where the foreign traders' enclave was formerly located.

== Regions of influence ==
Ancient Chinese records as well as modern archaeological studies prove the presence of Hinduism in several regions of China:

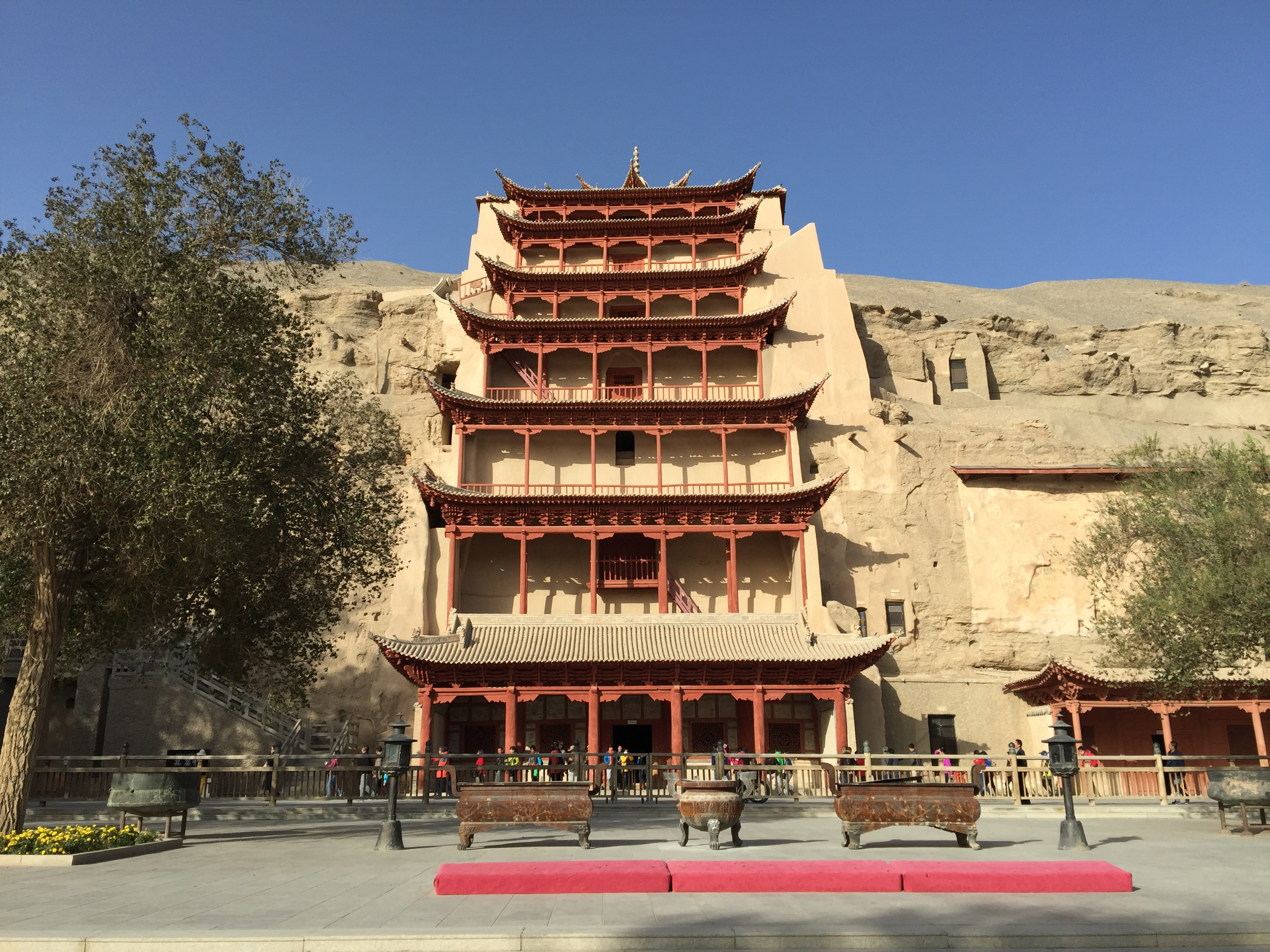
In Mogao Caves, Dunhuang, Gansu, along with Buddhist arts, numerous arts of Hindu deities have also been found. For example, in cave no. 285, there is grotto of Hindu deity Ganesha, suggested to be from 6th century AD.

- Ports of China in Guangdong and Quanzhou provinces, mainly by Tamil Hindu traders who had been welcomed by Chinese and who had established residencies (diaspora communities) and built Hindu temples while they facilitated and served the needs of Sino-Indian trade in a wide range of goods.
- Kamrup route (Assam) through Myanmar into south Chinese province of Yunnan as well as other southwestern regions of modern China. This is attested by the discovery of linga and yoni (symbols associated with Shiva) in Jianchuan caves (Shizhongshan) and other Hindu motifs found during excavation of Dali temple in Yunnan.
- Tsung-Ling route (now through Kashmir) was the route that helped monks and travelers from China bring Buddhism into China; along with Buddhist texts, many ancient Hindu texts and ideas were also carried into China. The archaeological evidence of Hinduism's presence in ancient China comes from Lop Nur and Kizil Caves in Xinjiang province, where carvings of deity Ganesha, another mural of a scene from Ramayana epic with Hanuman, and frescoes of other Hindu deities. These have been dated to be from 4th to 6th century AD. This route is also credited with the spread of some Hindu ideas and arts in north-central China by 5th century AD, into provinces as far as Shanxi, as evidenced by caves 7 through 9 of Yungang Grottoes in Datong, dedicated to various Hindu deities such as Vishnu and Shiva.
- Nepal route which brought ideas from tantric school of Nepalese Hinduism and Buddhism to Tibetan region.

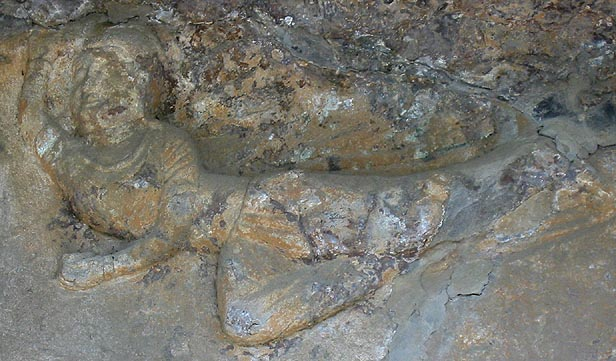
An apsara from the Longmen Grottoes in Luoyang, Henan, China.

The Chinese texts from the 2nd through the 12th centuries AD suggest some 150 scholars focused on translating various Hindu Sanskrit texts into Chinese. Vedas were referred to as ming-lun (science of knowledge) or zhi-lun (science of intelligence). Ancient Chinese scholars also translated various other Samhitas and Shastras. Some Sanskrit texts whose original and all translations have been lost in India, have been located in China - for example, Jin Qi Shi Lun (金七十論) is a surviving translation of Sankhya-Karika. Another example of influential translations is credited to Yijing's translation of hymns from Harivamsa from 1st to 3rd century AD, which is well known account of god Krishna and an appendix to the Hindu Epic Mahabharata. Yijing translated few Harivamsa hymns meant for goddess Durga, but associated them with goddess Sarasvati. This Hindu concept of a goddess of knowledge, music, arts and inner power became fused with elements of a goddess with militant power, which then became known as the Chinese Biàncáitiān, one of the Twenty-Four Devas still enshrined in modern Chinese Buddhist temples.

Ancient Hindu Sanskrit inscriptions, a language typically not used to spread Buddhism in China, have also been found in Yunnan province. These inscriptions are at least from medieval era; however, it remains unclear how and when they arrived or were adopted in China.

== Hinduism in the Cultural Revolution and Beyond ==
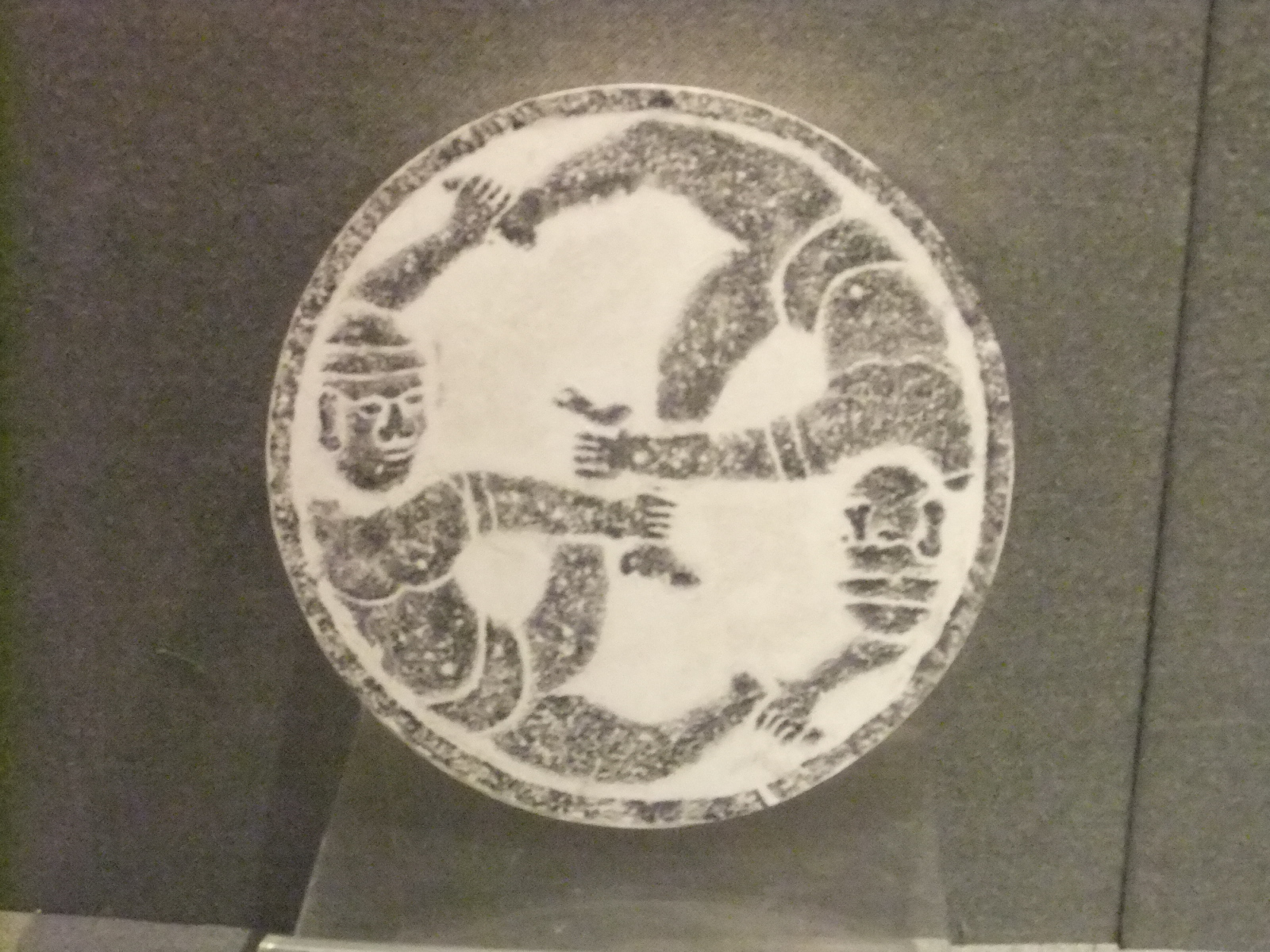
Hindu relief, Quanzhou Museum

Hinduism in China faced even more obstacles during the rise of Communism in China, when the Chinese Communist government discouraged any practice of religion, as it was considered anti-socialist, as well as a symbol of feudalism and foreign colonialism. During the Communist Cultural Revolution, a movement which took place from 1966 to 1977, religious people of all faiths were persecuted, and during this time, many religious buildings and services were closed down and repurposed to serve as non religious buildings for more materialistic services. However, from 1977 onwards, the government eased their restrictions on religion as the Constitution of China was signed and many of the Chinese were allowed to practice their religious and personal beliefs once again. Even so, the government is still very suspicious of other religious activities, specifically if it involves foreign nations.

Many Chinese tourists visits Phra Phrom in Thailand to make wishes.

== Practice of Hinduism in China ==
Although Hinduism is not one of the five official state recognized religions (Buddhism, Taoism, Catholicism, Protestantism, and Islam), and although China is officially an atheist state, the practice of Hinduism is tolerated in China, albeit on a limited scale. The traces of Hinduism's influence on China can be found in Chinese Buddhism.

== Mainland China ==
A number of Hindu expatriates live in China. Their numbers are relatively small, and therefore their faith is not among the five officially state recognized religious organizations in China. They are permitted to safely practice their faith throughout the country, even in mainland China. Tibet is considered both Hinduism and Tibetan Buddhism and is the region's sacred Mount Kailash.

The Chinese government has invited the Swaminarayan Trust (BAPS), who runs the Akshardham temples in New Delhi and in Gandhinagar, to build a similar temple in mainland China, among the first of its kind. A huge piece of land was earmarked in Foshan in 2007, which is intended to not only house the temple but also be home to an Indian cultural centre. A Balinese Hindu temple is also planned to be built in China.

The International Society for Krishna Consciousness (ISKCON) has a small presence in mainland China, with small pockets of devotees in various cities across the country. ISKCON was featured on Guangdong Television for its activities in teaching and practice of yoga and meditation in China.

== Hinduism in Hong Kong ==
The International Society for Krishna Consciousness (ISKCON), a major Gaudiya Vaishnava institution worldwide, has a center in Hong Kong, established there in 1981. As of 2016, approximately 1.4% of residents of Hong Kong are currently practicing Hindus of various sects; these include expatriates and lifelong practicing citizens as well as others.

== Hindu legacy in Quanzhou ==
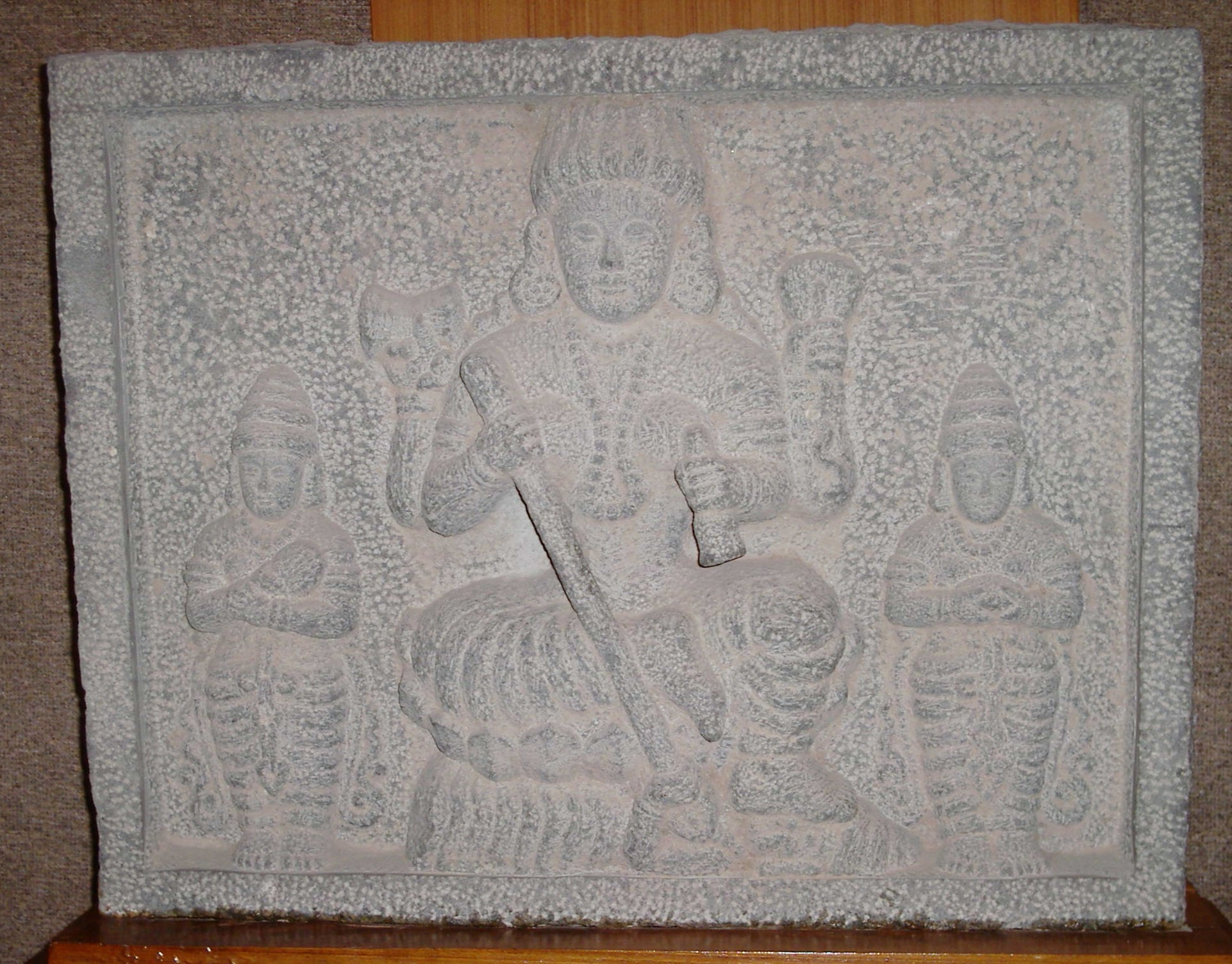
Carving of Shiva from the Hindu Temple at Quanzhou

Region of China where archaeological evidence confirms presence of Hinduism in medieval China.

Evidence of Hinduism in China has been found in and around Quanzhou in Fujian province, suggesting a Hindu community and particularly Tamil Hindu traders in medieval China. The evidence consists of a Tamil-Chinese bilingual inscription dated April 1281 AD, devoted to the deity Śiva, as well as over 300 artifacts, idols and Chola-style temple structures discovered in Fujian province since 1933. Archeological studies suggest at least Vaishnavism and Shaivism schools of Hinduism had arrived in China in its history.

At present, there are no Hindus in Quanzhou. However, there previously existed a Tamil Hindu community in the city who, in the late 13th century, built the Kaiyuan Temple dedicated to Lord Shiva. The temple is now in ruins, but over 300 carvings are still within the city. Many are currently on display in the Quanzhou museum, and some have become a part of a Buddhist temple—Kaiyuan Temple. Behind its main hall "Mahavira Hall”, there are some columns decorated by some Hinduism carvings. The carvings are dispersed across five primary sites in Quanzhou and the neighboring areas. They were made in the South Indian style, and share close similarities with 13th-century temples constructed in the Kaveri Delta region in Tamil Nadu. Nearly all the carvings were carved with greenish-gray granite, which was widely available in the nearby hills and used in the region's local architecture. Shiva-related themes depicted in Quanzhou temple include the story of Gajaranya Kshetra - an elephant worshipping a Shiva linga, the story of the Saivite saint Thirumular depicted through a cow anointing a linga, and two Hindu wrestler stories from the Indian region now called as Andhra Pradesh.

In addition to Shiva, a Vishnu sculpture has been discovered in Nanjiaochang area. Two pillars on the Kaiyuan temple have seven images dedicated to Vishnu - one with Garuda, one in the man-lion Narasimha avatar, one depicting the legend of Gajendra Moksha, one with Lakshmi, one as Krishna stealing milkmaids clothing to tease them, one depicting the story of Vishnu as Krishna subduing serpent Kaliya, and another of Krishna in Mahabharata.

== See also ==
- Buddhism in China
- Religion in China
- Hinduism
- Hinduism in Southeast Asia
- Hinduism by country
- List of Hindu temples
- Chinas
