= List of Legend of Heavenly Sphere Shurato characters =

This is a list of characters and organizations in the manga and anime series Legend of Heavenly Sphere Shurato.

== The Hachibushu ==
In the world of Tenkūkai, the Eight Legions (八部衆, Hachibushū) are a group of eight mystical warriors of legend (inspired by the traditional eight guardians of Buddhism tradition). Presumably, they are all the same people repeatedly reincarnated without any memories of their former lives. Their primary purpose is to defend the leader of Tenkūkai, Lady Vishnu and the rest of Tenkūkai from forces of evil called the Asura Gods. Alternatively they are also called the Deva Gods, seemingly based on both the Hindu Deva deities and the Buddhist supernatural beings. They are extremely powerful, possessing large quantities of Soma (光流, Sōma), the inner essence that is the source of their power, and politically high-ranked, taking direct orders only from Indrah and Vishnu herself.

Each of the Hachibushu possesses a Shakti (神甲冑, Shakuti), a small murti called Veda (護符, Vēda), modeled after various mythical beings, which can be used as a lantern. By holding their Shaktis and chanting specific mantras, any of the Hachibushu can transform into a super-powered version of themselves, clad in mystical body armor also modeled after an animal, and wielding a legendary weapon. While armored, the Hachibushu are stronger, tougher, and able to manipulate their Soma into extremely powerful techniques by performing specific mudras and chanting specific mantras. Multiple Hachibushu can also work together to combine their techniques. The Hachibushu can also cause a partial transformation of their Shakti, turning it not into armor but a Valuda (神甲機, Baruda), a hoverboard-like vehicle with four green fireball-shaped wheels/thrusters on both sides used for rapid transportation.

During the course of the anime, two of the Hachibushu, Shurato and Hyūga, are framed for the petrification of Vishnu and assumed evil. They eventually persuade two other Hachibushu, Ryōma and Reiga to their cause. These four become the "good" Hachibushu, whereas the other four become primary antagonists in the show.

=== Shurato, the King Shura ===
Hidaka Shurato (日高秋亜人), also Shura-ō Shurato (修羅王シュラト) and (Su・ra・to) in the Siddhaṃ script.
Voiced by: Toshihiko Seki (preview narrator)

Shurato Hidaka or Shurato, the King Shura, is the main protagonist of the series. A 16-year-old from Earth, Shurato is a brash, reckless, rude, impatient, and lazy individual. However, he is also brave, compassionate, and pure-hearted, and his resolve becomes the backbone of the "good" Hachibushu on their quest and the rallying point of the protagonists. His unfit behavior for a hero is remarked upon by many characters. He is an accomplished martial arts, a trait that quickly becomes useful in his time on Tenkūkai.

When he first discovers he is the reincarnation of a god on Tenkūkai, and is destined to fight the Asura Gods, Shurato is reluctant to get involved, although he does find Lady Vishnu extremely attractive. However, after witnessing a fight between Reiga and Ryōma, Shurato resolves to join the fight in order to prevent best friends from fighting each other and restore the peace in Tenkūkai. His other primary motivation is discovering what really happened to his best friend Gai.

Shurato and Gai have been best friends since high school, a seemingly unlikely pair due to their drastically differing personalities, but the two are extremely loyal to each other. Both martial arts masters, they are depicted as perfect equals, and were teleported to Tenkūkai in the midst of a tournament round battle. As Shurato is the best friend of Gai and knows he would never intentionally harm another living being, he is extremely confused and distraught when a changed Gai attempts to kill him and others repeatedly. Shurato resolves to return Gai to normal, an act which he attempts several times but fails.

His Shakti armor is inspired by a lion-like Shura being, and his weapons are a vajra—a one-handed club-like weapon—and a shield. As Shurato has not been trained in the fighting styles and techniques of the Hachibushu, he is the only one of the eight who at first does not know how to manipulate his Soma correctly and perform his Soma techniques. However, he substitutes his Earth-trained martial arts instead, and is eventually taught to utilize the full potential of his powers.

Later, it is revealed that Shurato is one of the successors of Brahma, the Creator of Tenkūkai and presumably Earth. Brahma sacrificed his mortal form to seal away the Asura Gods 10,000 years prior to the events of the anime, leaving behind only his sacred Shakti, which would bestow godlike powers to its wielder. As Gai is also a successor to Brahma, the two best friends battle for control of the artifact, with Shurato ultimately being the victor. However, he initially cannot use it, as in order to unleash the power of Brahma, there must be a balance between light and dark, with Shurato representing the light and Gai representing the dark. This means Shurato and Gai must work together to use the power of Brahma.

Techniques:

- Shura's Demon Destroying Fist (修羅魔破拳, Shura Mahha-ken)
- Shura's Demon Destroying Vajra Attack (修羅金剛魔破拳, Shura Kongō Mahha-ken)
- Shura's Light Fist (修羅光破拳, Shura Kōhaken)
- Demonic Wolf's Gale Sword (疾風魔狼剣, Shippū Marōken)
- Beast King's Maṇḍala Formation – Lion's Face (獣王曼陀羅陣・獅子の面, Jūō Mandara-jin – Shishi no Men)

=== Gai, the King Yaksha ===
Kuroki Gai (黒木凱), also Yasha-ō Gai (夜叉王ガイ)
Voiced by: Takehito Koyasu

Gai Kuroki or Gai, the King Yaksha, is one of the major antagonists of the show and a primary character. He was the best friend of Shurato on Earth, but became his worst enemy on Tenkūkai. He is the second person to find Shurato after he is teleported to Tenkūkai (the first being Laksh), and attempts to kill him. As Shurato does not know how to use his Soma correctly, he is defeated, but before he can be killed, Gai is fought off by Reiga. Gai's apparent hatred for Shurato confuses the hero throughout the show.

Gai was a brother of sorts to Shurato on Earth, having been friends and companions since childhood. Like Shurato, he was a martial arts master, but unlike the reckless, brash Shurato, who only focused on complete offense, the calm and pacifist Gai practiced an almost entirely defensive style. The two were equals, with a record between them of 30 wins and 30 losses each. Gai was also extremely compassionate, having once nursed a pigeon back to health amongst other various good deeds.

However, on Tenkūkai, Gai exhibits a completely different personality, full of hatred and rage towards Shurato and a willingness to hurt and kill anyone in his path. This completely sadistic Gai confuses Shurato, who often attempts to reason with him instead of fight him, initially unwilling to hurt his best friend. As Gai utilizes dark Soma (marked by a dark blue coloring instead of the normal golden), Shurato eventually realizes Gai is under the influence of the Asura Gods and attempts to free him, but is unsuccessful.

Later, it is revealed that when Vishnu teleported Shurato and Gai from Earth, Shiva managed to disrupt the spell, kidnapping Gai and causing Shurato to randomly land somewhere in Tenkūkai in the process. The captive Gai was then filled with Shiva's dark Soma, corrupting him and turning him into the evil warrior of the anime. Shiva did this as she/he knew that Gai was one of the successors of Brahma, intending to groom him as his/her champion so that he could obtain the power of the creator god.

His Shakti armor is inspired by the wolf-like Yaksha being, and his weapons are a longsword, a large chakram, and a shield. He is apparently the most powerful of the Hachibushu, able to match four others at once in a battle, although this may simply be the result of his blessings from Shiva. He attempts to kill Shurato multiple times but fails. He also comes close to obtaining the power of Brahma, but fails in that also. Although Shurato works hard to return Gai to normal, he is unsuccessful until the very end, when a released Gai combines his power with Shurato's to summon the armor of Brahma and defeat Shiva. Gai dies in the battle, appearing later only as a voice and a flashback.

Techniques:

- Demonic Wolf's Gale Sword (疾風魔狼剣, Shippū Marōken)
- Yaksha's Life Drainer (夜叉金剛縛, Yasha Kingōshō)

=== Reiga, the King Garuda ===
Karura-ō Reiga (迦楼羅王レイガ)
Voiced by: Kazuhiko Inoue

Reiga, the King Garuda is the Hachibushu who returns Shurato to Vishnu and teaches him a lot about Tenkūkai, and the last to join Shurato's group of "good" Hachibushu. Extremely intelligent, Reiga is skilled in the manipulation of Soma and knows much of the geography of Tenkūkai and the lore surrounding the Devas and Asura. He is depicted as very effeminate, although this is never stated.

Reiga at first appears as a very lazy and laid-back individual, unwilling to get involved with troublesome affairs and generally not very well liked by some of the other Hachibushu, who are more devout and diligent. However, this demeanor belies an intelligent and serious mind, and Reiga is actually a very calculative and perceptive individual. He discovers the truth behind the conspiracy on his own, realizing that Indrah is the actual culprit and Shurato is innocent.

Reiga strongly respects the like-minded Kūya, who are both very intelligent and masters of manipulating Soma. The two are then pitted against each other while trying to open the Heiseimon Gate, but Reiga refuses to fight, instead trying to persuade Kūya back onto his side. After an exhausting battle, Kūya dies in Reiga's arms, and a resolute Reiga vows to fight in honor of his friend.

His Shakti armor is inspired by the kite-like Karura, the Japanese Buddhist name of the Garuda, and his weapons are a pair of ring-shaped chakrams and a shield. He knows the most techniques of any of the Hachibushu, and most of them revolve around feathers or the fire aspect of his totem animal. As he is not a very physical-minded warrior, he often uses his chakrams in his Soma techniques rather than for combat.

Techniques:

- Garuda's Feather Blizzard (迦楼羅翼吹雪, Karura Hanefubuki)
- Garuda's Spiritual Vision Feathers (迦楼羅霊視羽, Karura Reishiu)
- Garuda's Super Scattering of Spiritual Vision Feathers (迦楼羅霊視羽超伝播, Karura Reishiu Chōdenban)
- Garuda's Wings Lightning Storm (迦楼羅翼紫嵐, Karura Yokushiran)
- Garuda's Fire Wings Formation (迦楼羅火翼陣, Karura Kayokujin)
- Beast King's Maṇḍala Formation – Bird's Face (獣王曼陀羅陣・猛禽の面, Jūō Mandara-jin – Mōkin no Men)

=== Hyūga, the King Tennin ===
Ten-ō Hyūga (天王ヒュウガ)
Voiced by: Kenyū Horiuchi

Hyūga, the King Tennin is the leader of the Hachibushu, and the most devoted follower of Vishnu. Stalwart to a fault, Hyūga idolized Vishnu and Indrah and for a time could think of nothing but blindly fighting to cure Vishnu from her petrification. At first, Hyūga despised Shurato due to his laziness and sacrilege, but came to regard him as a friend due to their similar ideals regarding camaraderie.

Hyūga's best friend is Ryōma, the two having trained and fought together in the past to the point where they know each other's strategies and techniques by heart. When Ryōma is manipulated into thinking Hyūga is evil, the two do battle, but due to their similar strengths and knowledge of the other's abilities, they fight into a standstill. This battle convinces Shurato to join Hyūga and help Vishnu, if only to prevent best friends from having to fight each other ever again.

Hyūga is also strongly hinted to have feelings for Renge, but he never acts on them or informs her of his feelings. During the opening of the Heiseimon Gate, he is pitted against Renge, and after realizing they were not meant to be together, he regrettably freezes her solid and kills her. A now resolute Hyūga vows to kill Indrah and fight for his love.

His Shakti armor is inspired by Waghoba, a tiger-like deity in Hinduism, and its name is based on Devas, mythical beings known in Japan as Tennin. His weapons are a type of nunchaku, somewhat of a split between a kanabō, a chain whip, and a surujin, and a shield. Many of his abilities revolve around ice, and he is able of creating walls of ice and freezing opponents solid.

Techniques:

- Deva's Crystal Bind (天王水晶結, Ten-ō Suishōketsu)
- Deva's Magical Subduing Steel (天王降魔鋼, Ten-ō Gōmakō)
- Deva's Magical Destroyer Steel (天王滅魔鋼, Ten-ō Etsubakō)
- Beast King's Maṇḍala Formation – Tiger's Face (獣王曼陀羅陣・猛虎の面, Jūō Mandara-jin – Mōko no Men)

=== Ryōma, the King Dragon ===
Ryū-ō Ryōma (龍王リョウマ)
Voiced by: Kōichi Yamadera (narrator)

Ryōma, the King Dragon is the strongest member of the Hachibushu, a massive warrior and a devoted follower of Vishnu. Ryōma's devotion to Vishnu ultimately trumps his trust for Hyūga, and thinking his best friend has somehow been corrupted, Ryōma sets out to kill Hyūga and Shurato.

Ryōma and Hyūga are best friends, and the two exhibit similar personalities. Ryōma comes to appreciate Shurato's ideals as well, and forms a loyal camaraderie with his fellow Hachibushu. Ryōma is set to fight Gai during the opening of the Heiseimon Gate, and although the group is unsuccessful in releasing Gai from the grip of his dark masters, this event fully convinces Ryōma of Shurato's will and fighting spirit, and he resolves to aid him.

His Shakti armor is inspired by the dragon-like Nāga, and his weapons are a trishula—an Indian trident—and a shield. Due to his immense strength, he is able of wielding his heavy weapon with great skill and agility.

Techniques:

- Dragon King's Blazing Halberd (龍王火炎戟, Ryū-ō Kaengeki)
- Dragon King's Explosive Flames (龍王爆炎戟, Ryū-ō Bakurengeki)
- Beast King's Maṇḍala Formation – Dragon's Face (獣王曼陀羅陣・龍の面, Jūō Mandara-jin – Ryū no Men)

=== Renge, the Queen Naara ===
Nāra-ō Renge (那羅王レンゲ)
Voiced by: Megumi Hayashibara

Renge, the Queen Naara is the only female member of the Hachibushu. As the sole female in a field of mostly men, she exhibits an unreasonable willingness to prove her strength and superiority to the others, especially the feminine Reiga. She is the target of much love from Mari'ichi and Hyūga, but does not reciprocate these feelings in either case.

Rather, she is obsessively in love with Indrah, being in a one-sided relationship where she blindly follows him even when she witnesses evidence of his evil and betrayal of Vishnu. Ultimately, she seems to realize her own folly and the futility of her actions, and allows herself to be frozen and killed by Hyuuga, achieving happiness and peace at last.

Her Shakti armor is inspired by the unicorn-like Kinnara mythical beings, known in Japan as Naara, and her weapons are a lotus-shaped phurba, which doubles as a rope dart, and lotus-shaped shuriken. She is also able to use her phurba as a sort of gun, firing Soma in her techniques.

Techniques:

- Kinnara's Lonely Flower (那羅無双華, Nāra Musōka)
- Kinnara's Crimson Spiritual Petals (那羅朱霊華, Nāra Shureika)
- Eight Guardians' Ultimate Triple Shot (八部衆三練功, Hachibushu Sanrenkō)

=== Kūya, the King Dappa ===
Dappa-ō Kūya (闥婆王クウヤ)
Voiced by: Kazuhiro Nakata

Kūya, the King Dappa is the most devout of the Hachibushu. He is very humble and polite, and is often seen meditating. This pits him against Shurato, as he witnesses him desecrating Vishnu's palace early on, and is convinced of his corruption. He is very respected and idolized by the citizens of Tenkūkai.

Very intelligent, Kūya is skilled in the manipulation of his Soma, able to mask his and other's Soma or turn invisible. When he fights Reiga during the opening of the Heiseimon Gate, Kuuya is not fully convinced of his innocence and refuses to stop fighting, until he is shown a vision of his own sister's death. He realizes he has been wrong, but he is mortally wounded and it is too late, and he dies in the arms of his friend.

His Shakti armor is inspired by the buffalo-like Gandharva mythical spirits, known in Japan as Dappa, appropriate due to his slow and steady nature. His weapons are a pair of wheel-shaped chakrams. His abilities primarily revolve around summoning and controlling water.

Techniques:

- Dappa's Whirlpool (闥婆水滸輪, Dappa Suikōrin)
- Dappa's Sea-mine Piercer (闥婆水雷染, Dappa Suiraisen)
- Eight Guardians' Ultimate Triple Shot (八部衆三練功, Hachibushu Sanrenkō)

=== Dan, the King Hiba ===
Hiba-ō Dan (比婆王ダン)
Voiced by: Nobuo Tobita

Dan, the King Hiba is a strong member of the Hachibushu. The youngest of five brothers, Dan is brash and hot-headed like Shurato, and often seeks to prove his strength. After a meeting with Vishnu, however, Dan became a changed man, and is obsessively devoted to her. As such, after her petrification, Dan is more than willing to fight the "corrupted" ones and kill them.

During the opening of the Heiseimon Gate, Dan fights Shurato, easily overpowering him and seemingly killing him. However, due to the actions of Laksh, he begins to doubt himself, until he and Shurato clash in a final test of power. Although they are evenly matched, Dan is distracted when a pendant given to him by Vishnu is broken, and as a result he is defeated. The last thing Dan does before he dies is close his hand around the pendant, a reminder of how his life was changed by the woman he idolized.

His Shakti armor is inspired by the rhinoceros-like Mahoraga mythical beings, known in Japan as Hiba, and his weapon is a parashu—an Indian battle axe. His powers revolve around earth, he is able to create quicksand and minor earthquakes.

Techniques:

- Hiba's Quicksand Surge (比婆流砂洸, Hiba Ryūsakō)
- Hiba's Earthquake Smash (比婆激震破, Hiba Gekishin-ha)
- Eight Guardians' Ultimate Triple Shot (八部衆三練功, Hachibushu Sanrenkō)

== Tenkūkai ==
The Tenūkai (天空界; 'Heavenly Realm') is a higher world from the human world's perspective.

=== Laksh of Hōraisan ===
Voiced by: Yūko Mizutani

Laksh of Hōraisan (蓬莱山のラクシュ, Hōraisan no Rakushu) Based on the Hindu goddess Lakshmi, Laksh is a young native of Tenkūkai and a fledgling spirit priestess. She is the first person to find Shurato after he is teleported to Tenkūkai, attempting to wake him up with a kiss. She then accompanies Shurato and Hyūga on their journey, and becomes a major asset to the team when her latent Soma powers manifest.

=== Mii ===
Mī (ミー)

Voiced by: Megumi Hayashibara

A Nāga youngling, Laksh's brave little friend and loyal companion. Also friend to Shurato, Reiga, Ryōma and Hyūga.

=== Lady Vishnu ===
Leader of the Tenkūkai, based on the Hindu god Vishnu. She summoned Shurato and Gai, but her spell was disrupted by Indrah. She's petrified by him, who blames Shurato for it.

=== Indrah ===
Based on the Hindu god Indra, he is Vishnu's right hand and the traitor who petrifies her, pitting the Hachibushu against each other.

== The Asura Gods ==
The Asura Gods are powerful warriors who tried to conquer Tenkūkai in the distant past, led by Shiva, the god of destruction. Ten thousand years before the events in the 20th century, they battled the Hachibushu in one of their previous incarnations, in a war of cataclysmic proportions and were sealed after their defeat by Lady Vishnu. Their seal is removed by Indrah, who sends three of their prominent warriors to kill the Hachibushu, to whom they introduce themselves as the Beast Fang Trio.

=== Shiva, the Goddess of Destruction ===
Hakai-shin Shiva (破壊神シヴァ)
Voiced by: Norio Wakamoto

Shiva, the Goddess of Destruction is Lady Vishnu's greatest enemy. She and her army were defeated and sealed by Vishnu and her warriors 10,000 years ago. Responsible for King Yaksha's reincarnation as an evil being.

=== Beast Fang Trio ===
==== Kundalini, the Gundari Wisdom King ====
Gundari Myō-ō Kuṇḍalinī (軍荼利明王クンダリーニ, Gundari Myō-ō Kundarīni)
Voiced by: Shinya Ōtaki

Kundalini is a member of the Beast Fang Trio who wears the cobra-shaped Shakti, summoned and freed of the seal that restrained them for millennia, by Indrah. Endowed with fearsome power and almost unlimited Soma. He engages the Hachibushu in battle and defeats them effortlessly. Shurato and his companions manage to defeat Kuṇḍalinī after their Soma potential is greatly increased by the sacrifice of Laksh.

Techniques:

- Gundari's Red-hot Breaker (軍荼利灼熱破, Gundari Shakunetsu-ha)

==== Trailo, the Gozanze Wisdom Queen ====
Gozanze Myō-ō Trailo (降三世明王トライロー, Gōzanze Myō-ō Torairō)
Voiced by: Mika Doi

Trailo is the female member of the Beast Fang trio, who wears the wyvern-shaped Shakti. She sets out to kill Shura-ō Shurato after the ignominious defeat of Kuṇḍalinī. Using a form of mist, she overpowers Shurato easily, although he manages to escape the mist and turn the battle to his favor. Trailō then erases Shurato's memories of Tenkūkai and his friends and sends him back to the earthly plane of existence, to the very moment of his match against Gai. Against all odds, Shurato recovers his memories of Tenkūkai and his condition as one of the Hachibushu, and discovers a way back. He engages Trailo in battle once again and finally kills her to save Reiga and Laksh's lives.

Techniques:

- Serpentine Hairs Lightning Shots (蛇髪雷光弾, Jahatsu Raikōdan)

==== Acalanatha, the Fudo Wisdom King ====
Fudo Myō-ō Ācalanātha (不動明王アカラナータ, Fudō Myō-ō Akaranāta)
Voiced by: Yasunori Matsumoto

Acalanatha is the most powerful member of the Beast Fang Trio, who wears the bat-shaped Shakti. Endowed with the ability to copy the battle techniques of his opponent. He engages the Hachibushu after the defeats of Kundalini and Trailo, subduing them effortlessly, and taking Saras' life. Acalanatha's superiority over his opponents was overwhelming, until Ryōma was able to discover his weakness, thanks to the memories of the Ryū-ō Shakti from the battle with Acalanatha millennia ago. Acalanatha was killed by Ryōma at the cost of his own life. Later, Acalanatha resurfaces even more powerful, revived by Shiva, and wreaks havoc among the ranks of Vishnu's servants. Despite seemingly unbeatable, Acalanātha suffers a crushing defeat and finally dies at the hands of Shurato wearing the mighty Shakti of Brahma.

Techniques:

- Vision of Spirits from the Past and Future (去来霊視光, Kyorai Reishikō)
- Wisdom Kings Fusion (明王合身, Myō-ō Kasshin)
- Beast Fang Explosion (獣牙裂光弾, Jūga Rekkōdan)

=== Haira, the Earth Emperor ===
Chitei Haira (地帝ハイラ)
Voiced by: Yū Shimaka

Haira is one of the group of Asura gods "Juuniratei" that accompanied Yasha-ō Gai in the quest for Brahma's Shakti. Hailah tries to stop Shurato and his friends from pursuing the same goal. Karura-ō Reiga engages Hailah in battle to allow his comrades to leave and continue their quest. A bloody battle ensues, with Hailah gaining an advantage due to his tremendous strength and size, which forces Reiga to consume all of his Sōma to unleash his extremely powerful Karura Kayoku-jin technique, killing Hailah but not without exhausting himself in the process.

=== Antera, the Sun Emperor ===
Hitei Antera (日帝アンテラ)
Voiced by: Ken'ichi Ono

Antera is one of the Asura gods and twin brother of Santera, the Moon Empress. Antera ruled over the duality principle of light. He also accompanied Yasha-ō Gai in the quest for Brahma's Shakti. He, along his sister, engaged Ryu-ō Ryōma and Ten-ō Hyūga in battle, trapping them inside their realm of duality.

Techniques:

- Ying Yang's Gravity Star (陰陽重力星, In'yō Jūryoku-sei)

=== Santera, the Moon Empress ===
Gettei Santera (月帝サンテラ)
Voiced by: Yūko Sasaki

Santera, is one of the Asura gods and twin sister of Antera, the Sun Emperor. Santera ruled over the duality principle of darkness. She also accompanied Yasha-ō Gai in the quest for Brahma's Shakti. She, along her brother, engaged Ryu-ō Ryōma and Ten-ō Hyūga in battle, trapping them inside their realm of duality.

Techniques:

- Yin Yang's Gravity Star (陰陽重力星, In'yō Jūryoku-sei)

=== Kubilah, the Fire Emperor ===
Katei Kubira (火帝クビラ)
Voiced by: Nozomu Sasaki

Kubilah is the last servant of Shiva to enter the battle. Kubilah engages Shurato in unequal combat, whom he overpowers with ease due to his wondrous speed of movement and attack. Although Kubilah severely injured Shurato, he was able to find a critical weakness in Kubilah's defense, killing him.

Techniques:

- Fire Emperor's Thousand-hands Savagery (火帝千手蛮, Katei Senjūban)
- Fire Emperor's Demon Consuming Flames (火帝魔限炎, Katei Magen'en)

== Support characters ==
=== In Tenkūkai ===
- Marishi-Ten Marichi (摩利支天マリーチ, Marishi-Ten Marīchi)

Voiced by: Yasunori Matsumoto

Friend of Hyūga and Renge, the object of his unrequited love. Afflicted by the fatal disease of the red spots. He was aware of Indrah's treason and tried to help Hyūga and the Hachibushu to save Lady Vishnu. Trying to convince Renge of the truth, Marichi engages her in battle despite being gravely ill, sacrificing his life as a proof of his love, of loyalty to Lady Vishnu and to implore Renge to see reason.

- Benzaiten Salas (弁財天サラス, Benzaiten Sarasu)

Voiced by: Yūko Sasaki

Female ally of Shurato, loyal to Lady Vishnu and aware of Indrah's treason. She sacrifices her life to save Shurato's, whom he believed to be the savior of Tenkūkai.

Techniques: Shikigami's Whirlwind Formation (式神龍巻陣, Shikigami Tatsumaki-jin)

- Mayuri, the Ucchuṣma Wisdom King (烏瑟沙摩明王マユリ, Ususama Myō-ō Mayuri)

Voiced by: Jūrōta Kosugi

Companion of Benzaiten Salas, also and ally to Shurato, loyal to Lady Vishnu and aware of Indrah's treason. He sacrifices his life battling valiantly Indrah's soldiers to clear a path to Tenkūden for Shurato, Hyūga and Reiga.

- Sati (サティ, Sati)

Voiced by: Sakiko Tamagawa

Renge's older sister, who nurses an injured Shurato back to health. She later learns of Renge's demise and tries to kill Shurato, whom she mistakenly considers Renge's murderer.

- Scrimeer, the god of harmony (調和神スクリミール, Chōwa-shin Sukurimīru)

Voiced by: Shō Hayami

Appearing only in the Sōsei e no Antō OVA arc, the extremely powerful god of harmony, sent to kidnap Gai Kuroki. Calm and seemingly harmless, he defeats Shurato effortlessly, even when wearing the Shura-ō Shakti.

=== In the human plane ===
- Yumiko Hidaka (日高由美子, Hidaka Yumiko)

Voiced by: Megumi Hayashibara

Shurato's cute younger sister.

- Yūtarō Hidaka (日高勇太郎, Hidaka Yūtarō)

Voiced by: Yuzuru Fujimoto

A master in Chinese martial arts and Shurato's grandfather, who trained him in martial arts since childhood. He also helps him indirectly to find a way back to Tenkūkai.

- Kiriko Hidaka (日高桐子, Hidaka Kiriko)

Voiced by: Kumiko Takizawa

Shurato and Yumiko's mother.

- Mina Kuroki (黒木美奈, Kuroki Mina)

Voiced by: Maria Kawamura

Gai's older sister, friend of Shurato.
