= Nü Tofu =

Deity in traditional Chinese belief

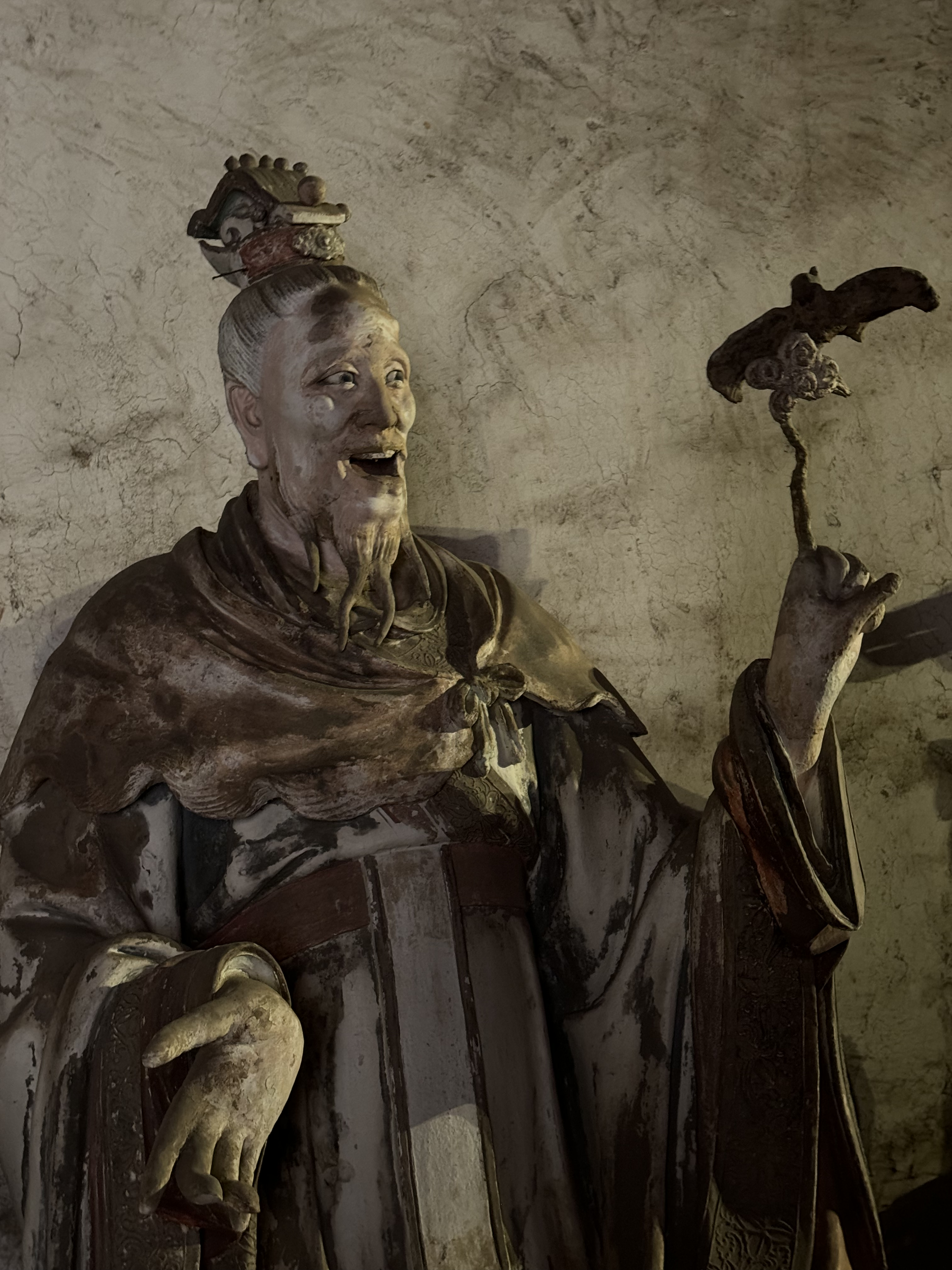
- Statue of Nü Tofu in the Jade Emperor Temple, Fucheng
- Simplified Chinese: 女土蝠
- Literal meaning: The Earth Bat of Girl
Transcriptions
Standard Mandarin
- Hanyu Pinyin: Nǚ Tǔfú

Nü Tofu (Chinese: 女土蝠; lit. 'The Earth Bat of Girl') is a deity or bat-spirit in traditional Chinese spiritual beliefs. She is considered to be one of the 28 Mansions, which are Chinese constellations. These constellations are the same as studied in Western astrology. Nü Tofu originated from the ancient Chinese worship of the constellations, a spiritual practice that combines Chinese mythology and astronomy. Th star ranked 3rd of the 7 stars in the Black Tortoise of the North, associated with bats and the element of earth.

== Legend ==
In the novel General Yue Fei, when Nü Tofu listened to the Buddha's sermon on the Lotus Sutra at Leiyin Temple with other stars. The star was fascinated and accidentally broke wind which stained the Buddhists' pure land, which made Buddhist guardian Dapeng Jinchi Mingwang furious. As a result, Dapeng swooped down from the throne and snatched Nü Tofu up in his beak, killing her. The Buddha admonished Peng for transgressing Buddhist law and exiled him to earth. Later, Dapeng reincarnates as Yue Fei and Nü Tofu reincarnates as Lady Wang (王氏) marrying Qin Hui, during the Song dynasty. Under Qin Hui's poisonous plot, Lady Wang killed Yue Fei in revenge.

== See also ==
- Shiji Niangniang
