= Dapeng Jinchi Mingwang =

Deity who is worshipped in Buddhism

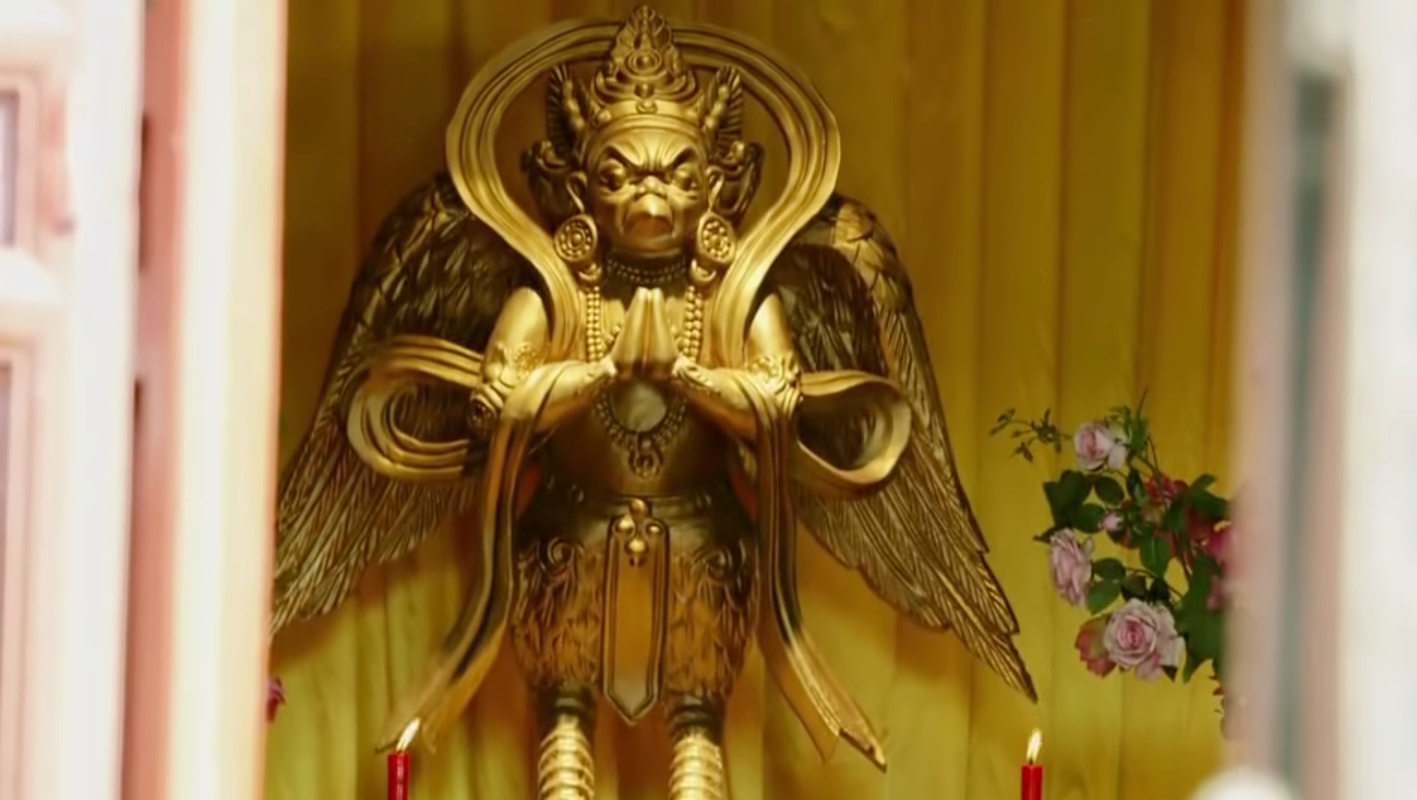
- Dapeng Jinchi Mingwang statue
- Traditional Chinese: 大鵬金翅明王
- Simplified Chinese: 大鵬金翅明王
- Literal meaning: The Golden-Winged King of Illumination
Transcriptions
Standard Mandarin
- Hanyu Pinyin: Dàpéng Jīnchì Míngwáng

Dapeng Jinchi Mingwang (Chinese: 大鵬金翅明王; lit. 'The Golden-Winged King of Illumination'), also known as the Golden-Winged Great Peng (金翅大鵬雕), is a guardian deity in Mahayana Buddhism. He is the spiritual uncle of the Buddha, who gave him a high position in heaven to guard the Pure Land. His origins are said to derive from an Indian bird god Garuda. Peng is one of the eight demi-gods of Buddhism (Tianlong Babu). He helps to guard Mount Sumeru and Trāyastriṃśa from attack by the Asuras.

Peng appears in works of ancient Chinese literature, including Journey to the West (西游記) and General Yue Fei (說岳全傳). He is also mentioned in some Chinese Buddhist literature. The famous patriot General Yue Fei (岳飛, 1103–1141), was believed by people to be the incarnation of Dapeng Jinchi Mingwang.

== Legends ==
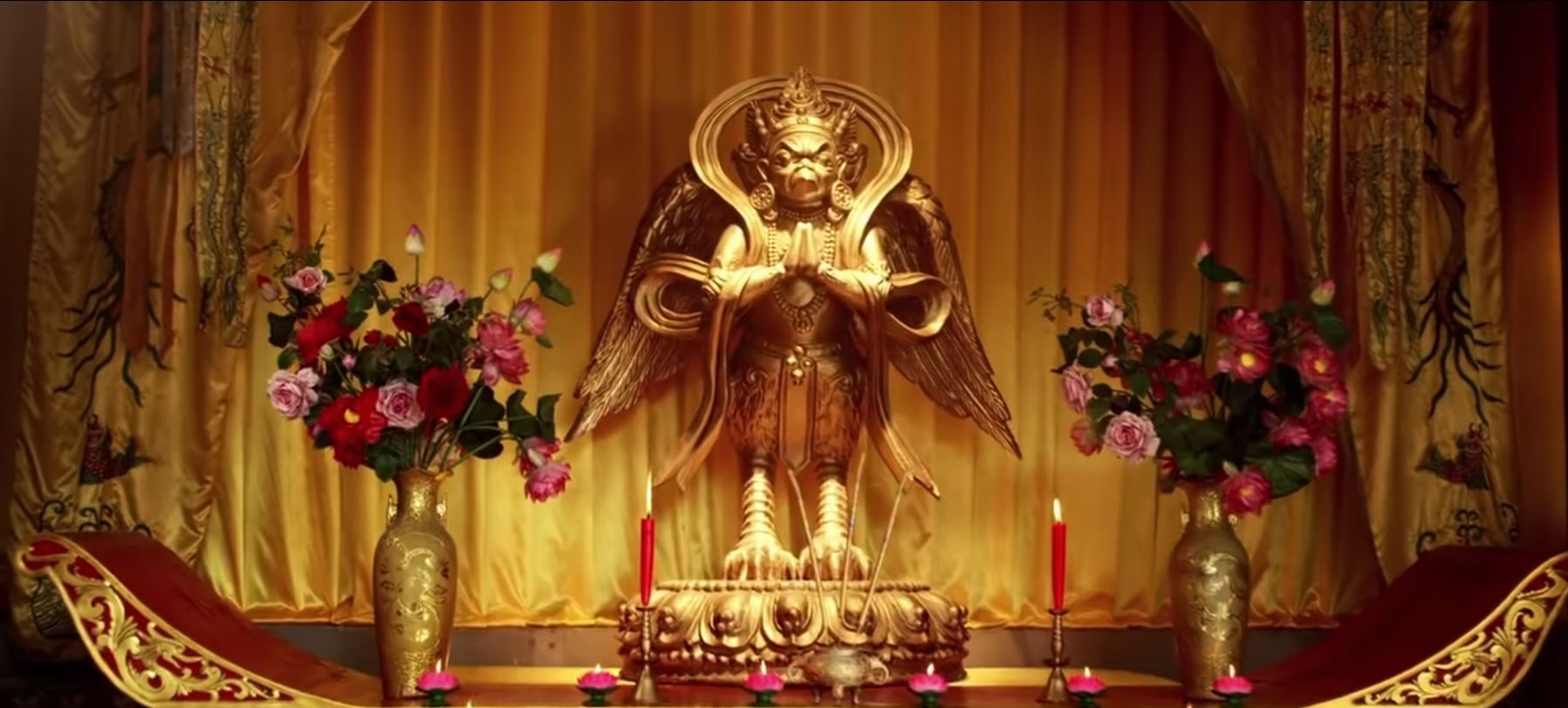
Dapeng Jinchi Mingwang statue in the Hongwu temple

Legend holds that in primordial times, the original Phoenix (Fenghuang), the leader of flying beings, gave birth to the peacock Mahamayuri and to the eagle named the Golden-Winged Great Peng. The peacock once consumed the Buddha, who managed to escape by cutting through her stomach. At that time, the peacock preyed on humans, and the Buddha intended to kill it. However, the deities intervened and urged him to stop. In exchange for a promise to renounce its habit of preying on humans, the Buddha elevated the peacock to the status of his godmother, while the eagle became his uncle and was granted a high position in heaven.

Peng sits at the head of the Buddha's throne in the Western Paradise. His fiery temper was aroused when the bat-spirit Nü Tofu listened to the Buddha's sermon on the Lotus Sutra at Leiyin Temple with other stars. Nü Tofu was fascinated and accidentally broke the wind, which stained the Buddhists' pure land. As a result, Peng swooped down from the throne and snatched Nü Tofu up in his beak, killing her. The Buddha admonished Peng for transgressing Buddhist law and exiled him to earth. Later, Peng reincarnates as Yue Fei, and the bat-spirit reincarnates as Lady Wang (王氏), marrying Qin Hui, during the Song dynasty. Under Qin Hui's poisonous plot, Lady Wang killed Yue Fei in revenge.

According to martial arts master Liang Shouyu's book, "[A] Dapeng is a great bird that lived in ancient China. Legend has it, that Dapeng was the guardian who stayed above the head of Gautama Buddha. Dapeng could get rid of all evil in any area. Even the Monkey King was no match for it. During the Song dynasty, the government was corrupt, and foreigners were constantly invading China. The Buddha sent Dapeng to earth to protect China. Dapeng descended to Earth and was born as Yue Fei."

== Journey to the West ==
There are two characters related to the Dapeng Jinchi Mingwang in the 16th-century Chinese classic novel Journey to the West.

The first is Dàpéng Mówáng (大鵬魔王; 'Great Peng Demon King'), a sworn brother of Sun Wukong and Niu Mowang who is mentioned three times in passing.

The second is the Jinchi Dapeng Diao (金翅大鵬雕; 'Golden-Winged Great Peng Eagle'), also called the Yunpeng Wanli (雲程萬里鵬; Yúnchéng Wànlǐ Péng; 'Peng who travels ten thousand li in the clouds'), born from the primordial fenghuang. The Buddha gave him a high position in heaven, which only served to fuel his ego. For an unknown reason, the Peng transformed himself into a humanoid form. Peng ate all residents of the Shituo Kingdom, ruled it for 500 years, and befriended the Azure Lion Demon and the Yellow-Toothed Elephant Demon to eat Tang Sanzang. Peng's powers and position as the Buddha's uncle fueled his ego, as he regarded himself above everyone else. He is armed with a ji and can fly over great distances. Peng has a flask called the yīnyáng èrqì píng (陰陽二氣瓶; 'Flask of Yin and Yang Qi'), which can suck in unsuspecting victims and turn them into liquid.

Peng made several plans to capture Tang Sanzang and his companions, and he successfully captured Sun Wukong himself. After many humiliating failures at the hands of the three demon kings, Wukong approached the Buddha for help and learned the backstory of Peng. After Wukong and the three demons battle, both the Lion and the Elephant are forced to revert to their original forms, and the Buddha shows up to subdue Peng and return him to Vulture Peak.

After his defeat at the Buddha's hand, Peng admits that he enjoys his demonic life eating humans, but after listening to the Buddha, Peng has no choice but to abandon his evil ways, redeeming himself in the process. After some struggle, the Peng agrees to become a protector of Buddhist law.

== Fengshen Yanyi ==
In the 16th-century Chinese classic novel Fengshen Yanyi, the character Yuyi Xian (Feathered Immortal) is based on the figure of Dapeng Jinchi Mingwang. Yuyi Xian appears as a bird spirit from Penglai Island. Later, Randeng Daoren accepted him as his second disciple. Initially, he was instigated to fly to Xiqi to seek revenge on Jiang Ziya. He possessed powerful magic capable of drying up the water of the four seas and attempted to drown Xiqi with the waters of the North Sea. However, he was later stopped by Yuanshi Tianzun with the Three Lights Divine Water. Randeng Daoren traced Yuyi Xian's whereabouts and enticed the hungry Yuyi Xian to eat 108 of his own prayer beads, thereby subduing him. To save his life, he became Randeng Daoren's disciple and mount, and later assisted Randeng Daoren in the battle against the Shang general and peacock spirit Kong Xuan, but was defeated and returned. He never appeared again in the later text.

== Shurangama Mantra ==
The Shurangama Mantra is a dhāraṇī or long mantra of Buddhist practise in China, Japan and Korea. The 302nd line of the mantra pertains to the Great Golden Winged Peng Bird, the Garuda, and its retinue, which includes all species of birds. The Great Golden-Winged Peng is the king among birds. The Peng bird feasts exclusively on dragons. His wing-span measures an astounding 330 yojanas (3,960 to 4,950 km). When Peng flaps his wings, the sea waters part clear to the deepest seabed.

== In popular culture ==
- Appeared as the main antagonist in the 2016 Chinese animation series New Calabash Brothers.

== See also ==
- Birds in Chinese mythology
- Fenghuang
- Peng (mythology)
