= Marichi Temple =

Marichi temple ମାରିଚୀ ମନ୍ଦିର
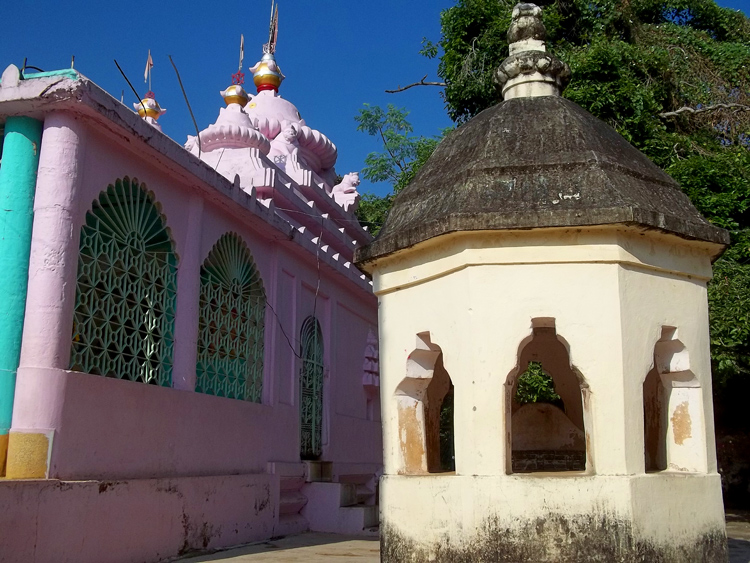

Religion
- Affiliation: Hinduism
- District: Baleswar
- Deity: Marichi, Varahi, Buddha
- Festivals: Durga Puja, Asokastami
- Governing body: Marichi Puja Committee, Ajodhya

Location
- Location: Ajodhya
- State: Odisha
- Country: India
- Interactive map of Marichi temple ମାରିଚୀ ମନ୍ଦିର
- Coordinates: 21°33′29.94″N 86°45′9.96″E

Architecture
- Type: Odishan Pidha vimana temple architecture
- Completed: 10-11th Century
- Temple: ୫

Marichi Temple (Odia: ମାରିଚୀ ମନ୍ଦିର) is a Hindu and Buddhist temple located in Ajodhya, Baleswar, Odisha, India.

== Location ==
This temple is situated 9 km north of Sajanagada. It is on the right side of the road leading from Nilagiri to Mayurbhanj in Baleswar district, Odisha.

== Construction ==
The temple is a newly built pidha vimana style building like other temples of Odisha. The temple houses many tantric, Jain and Buddhist images dating back to the late 11th century. It is thought that the Somavamsi Keshari dynasty commissioned the statues. There are many old icons such as the Hindu goddess four-handed Varahi, the Buddha in bhumisparsa or earth touching mudra, a Jain tirthankara or spiritual teacher and the bodhisattva Avalokitesvara.

The central icon is worshiped as the Hindu goddess Durga and next to the image is the Mahayana goddess Marici. The Marici image is flanked by two goddesses. The Garbhagriha or inner sanctum houses three icons from the late 11th century. Durga Puja is a famous festival in this temple.

== Gallery ==
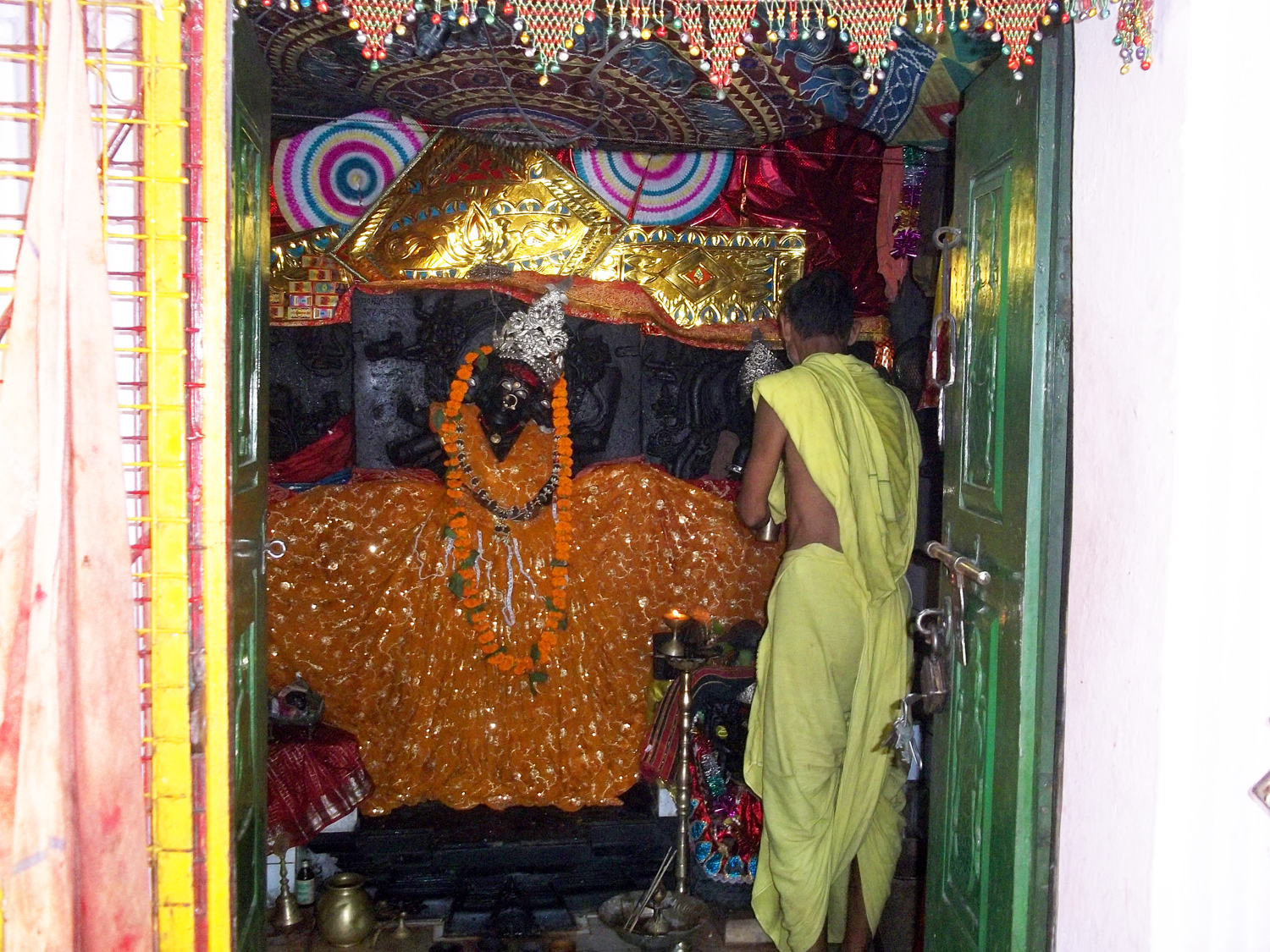
Marichi Thakurani

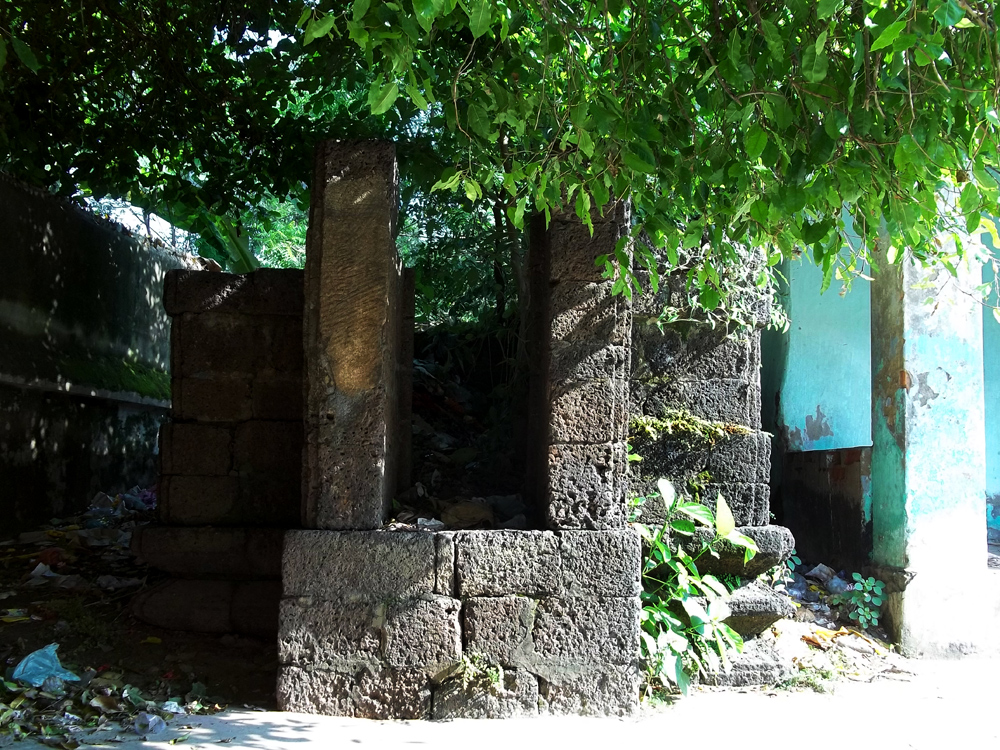
Buddhist stupa

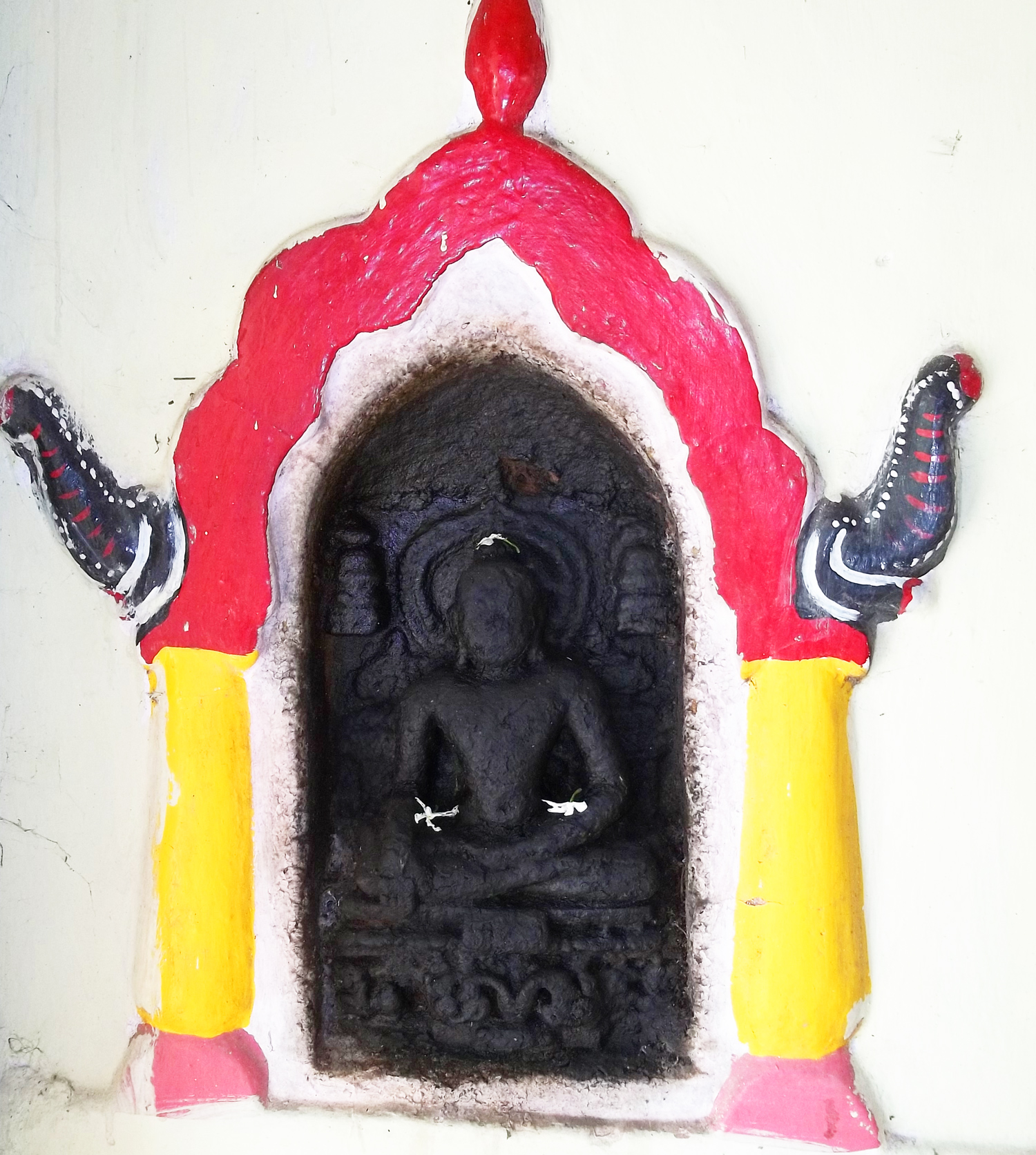
Buddha in Bhoomusparshamudra

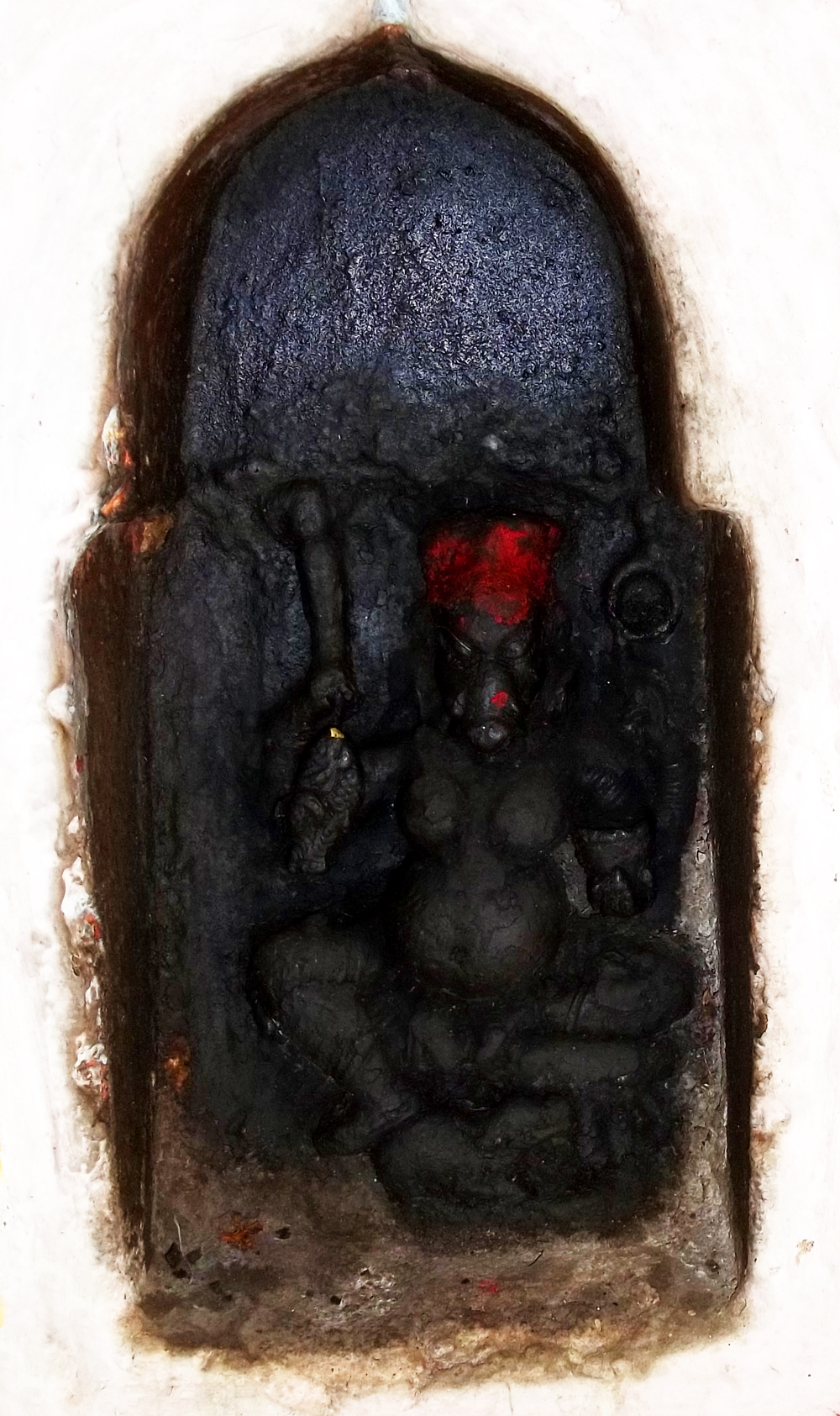
Varahi idol

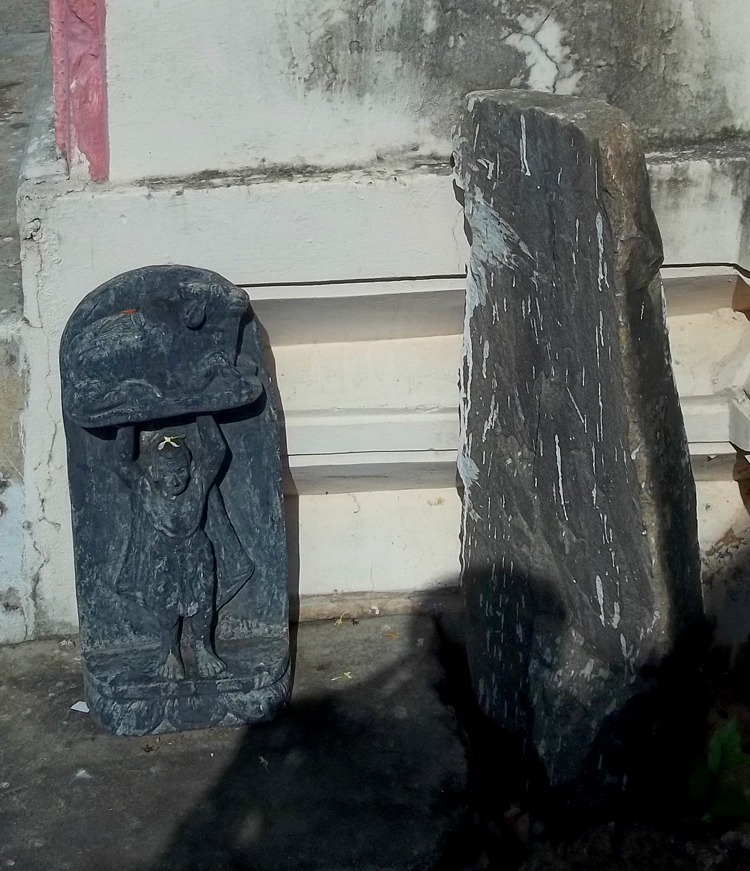
Ancient idols
