= Mahoraga =

Race of deities in Hinduism, Buddhism, and Jainism

Translations of Mahoraga
- English: Great Reptilians
- Sanskrit: महोरग (IAST: mahoraga)
- Pali: महोरग (mahoraga)
- Chinese: 摩睺羅伽 (Pinyin: móhóuluóqié)
- Japanese: 摩睺羅伽 (Rōmaji: magoraga)
- Korean: 마후라가 (RR: mahuraga)
- Tibetan: ལྟོ་འཕྱེ་ཆེན་པོ་ (lto ’phye chen po)
- Vietnamese: ma hầu la già

A mahoraga (in the variant of a human-headed serpent) depicted as one of the incarnations of Avalokiteśvara.

The Mahoraga (Sanskrit: महोरग), also pronounced as Maha-Uraga ("Greater Reptilians"), are a race of deities in Hinduism, Buddhism, and Jainism. They are the exalted ones among the Uragas, a race of primordial reptilian beings who are cousins to the nāga. Like the nāga, they are often depicted as anthropomorphic beings with reptilian bodies from the waist down. However, their appearance can differ depending on artistic tradition, sometimes having serpent skin with humanoid bodies, or having a serpent head with the body of a muscular divine human.

== Buddhism ==
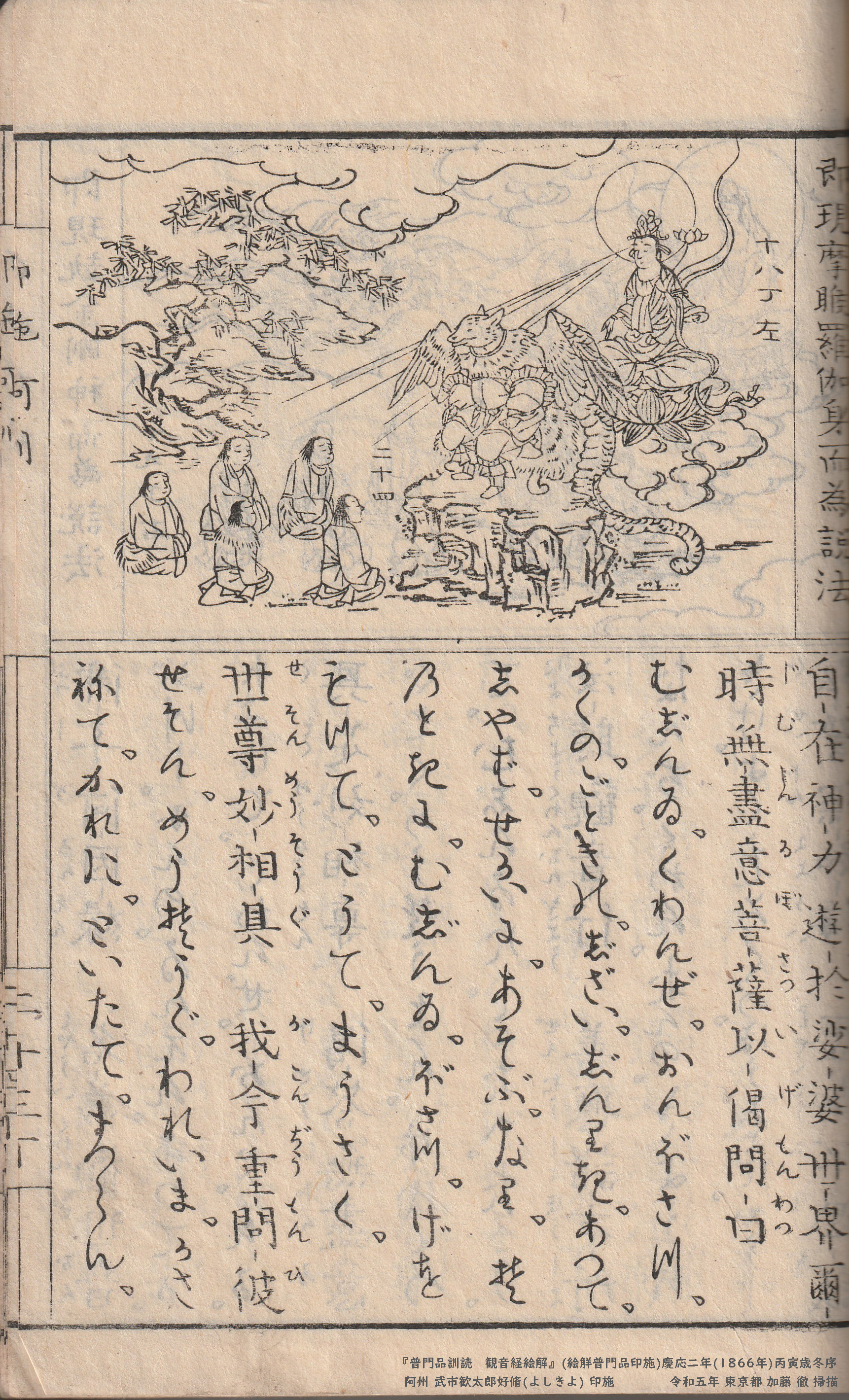
An illustration from an 1866 Japanese book. This mahoraga, who is an incarnation of Bodhisattva Kannon in this scene, gives a sermon to folks.

The Mahoraga are one of the eight classes of deities (aṣṭasenā) that are said to protect the Dharma. They are described as huge subterranean serpents who lie on their sides and rotate the earth, which occasionally causes earthquakes.

Like the kinnara, the Mahoraga are also associated with instrumental music. They are understood as being associated with large serpents such as pythons, while the nāgas are more closely related to the cobra.

According to the Śariputraparipṛcchā Sūtra (T. 1465), one is reborn as a shikigami as a result of practicing generosity and upholding the Dharma, adapting to tough circumstances, and being inclined toward anger.

== In popular culture ==
In Gege Akutami's manga series Jujutsu Kaisen, character Megumi Fushiguro harbors a monstrous shikigami by the name of Eight-Handled Sword Divergent Sila Divine General Makora (八握剣異戒神将魔虚羅, Yatsuka-no-Tsurugi Ikai Shinshō Makora). In this name, "Makora" refers to the Japanese name for Mahāla, one of the Twelve Heavenly Generals in Buddhist tradition. In most English translations of the series, however, "Makora" is erroneously rendered as "Mahoraga", making this the most commonly recognized and used name for the creature in the series's Western fandom.
