= Marici (Buddhism) =

Buddhist god

Mārīcī
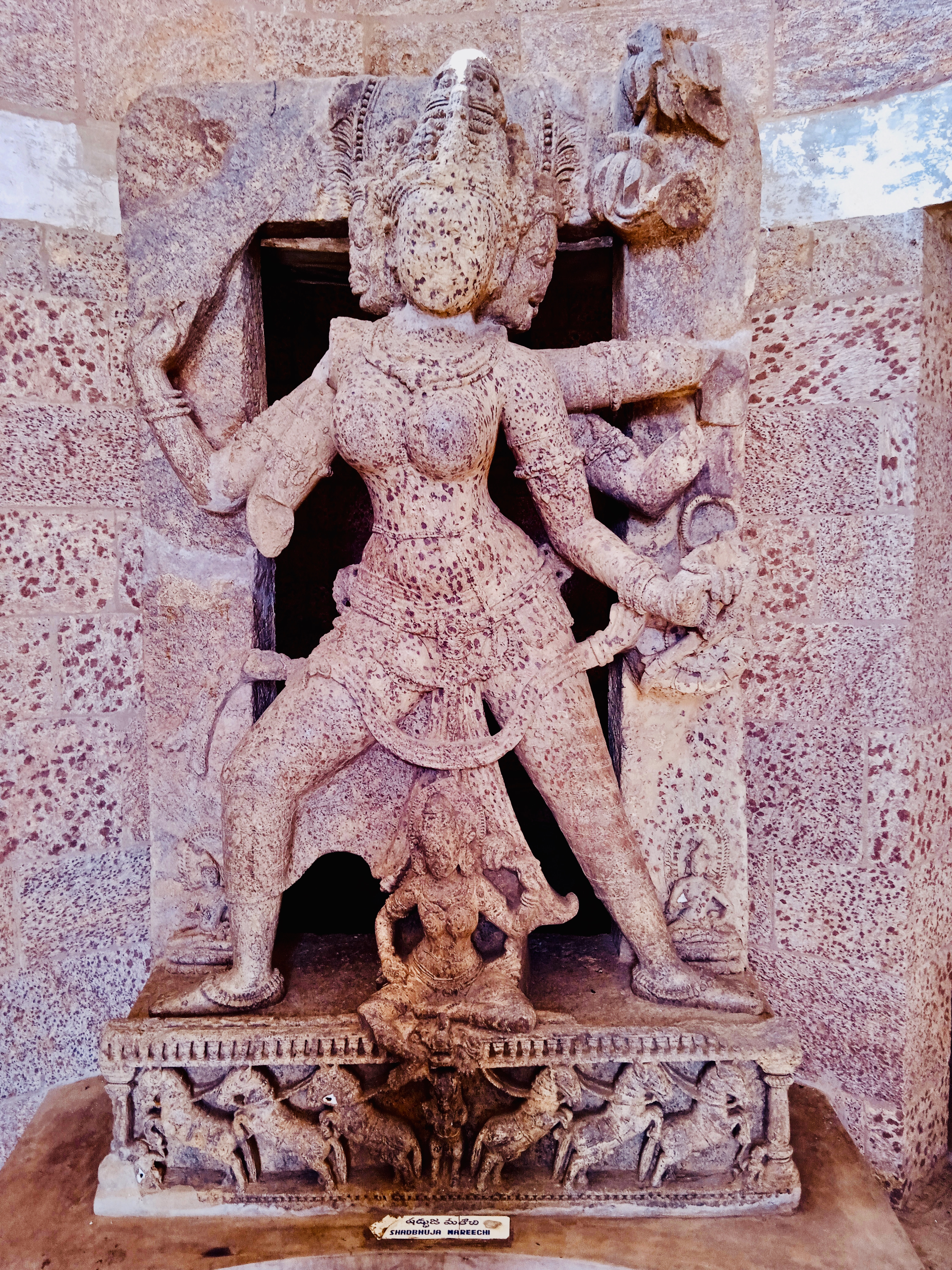
- Marici is a Buddhist deity, once popular among the warrior class in China, Korea and Japan; her earliest icons are found in northeast Andhra Pradesh (5th to 7th century, above) and Tibet.
- Sanskrit: मारीची Mārīcī
- Chinese: 摩利支天 (Pinyin: Mólìzhītiān)
- Japanese: 摩利支天(まりしてん) (romaji: Marishiten)
- Korean: 마리지천 (RR: Marijicheon)
- Tagalog: Malici
- Thai: มารีจี
- Tibetan: འོད་ཟེར་ཅན་མ་ Wylie: 'od zer can ma THL: Özerchenma
- Vietnamese: Ma Lợi Chi Thiên

Information
- Venerated by: Mahāyāna, Vajrayāna: (Mārīcī Sūtra); (Mārīcī Dhāraṇī Sūtra)

Mārīcī (Sanskrit: मारीची, lit. 'Ray of Light'; Chinese: 摩利支天; pinyin: Mólìzhītiān; Japanese: Marishiten) is a Buddhist deity (deva), as well as a bodhisattva associated with light and the Sun. By most historical accounts Mārīcī is considered a goddess, but in some regions she is depicted as a male god revered among the warrior class in East Asia. Mārīcī is typically depicted with multiple arms, riding a charging boar or sow, or on a fiery chariot pulled by seven horses or seven boars. She has either one head or between three and six, with one shaped like a boar. In parts of East Asia, in her fiercest forms, she may wear a necklace of skulls. In some representations, she sits upon a lotus.

Some of the earliest iconographies of Marici are found in India and Tibet, particularly near the ancient port city and Buddhist site Salihundam of Andhra Pradesh, where Māricī is depicted as riding on a chariot pulled by seven horses in a manner similar to Surya (sun deity with goddesses Usha and Chaya). In Mahayana Buddhist texts, Marici is the goddess of dawn, one introduced by the Buddha at Shravasti. In some aspects, she is comparable to, and likely a fusion deity derived from the feminine version of, Surya and, in other ways, to Usha, Durga, and Vajravārāhī. She is one of the goddesses (or gods) invoked in Buddhist dharanis.

In Tibetan Buddhism, she is depicted as the goddess of dawn or light, a healer, or the one who seeks enlightenment of all beings. In Japanese Buddhism, she is depicted as a warrior goddess – the protector of the bushi or Samurai and their passion for justice. Alternatively, she is also a healer from the wrong state to the right state of existence.

In Chinese Buddhism, she is among the lists as one of the guardian devas, specifically the Sixteen Devas (Chinese: 十六諸天; pinyin: Shíliù Zhūtiān), the Twenty Devas (Chinese: 二十諸天; pinyin: Èrshí Zhūtiān) and the Twenty-Four Devas (Chinese: Chinese: 二十四諸天; pinyin: Èrshísì Zhūtiān). In Taoism and Chinese folk religion, Doumu (Chinese: 斗母元君; pinyin: Dǒumǔ Yuánjūn) is considered to be synonymous with Mārīcī within Chinese Esoteric Buddhism.

Upon her discovery by the western world, colonial-era writers such as Giorgi conjectured on phonetic grounds that she might have been copied from or inspired by the Christian concept of the Virgin Mary after the earliest Spanish travelers reached the Philippines. However, this conjecture was rejected following the discoveries of numerous older artworks and texts.

== Origins ==
The origins of Mārīcī are obscure. She appears to be an amalgamation of Indic, Iranian, and non-Indo-Iranian solar goddesses.

She is also thought to have originated from the Vedic goddess Uṣas, the Vedic goddess of the dawn. She also shares some similarities with Surya, the solar god. In her martial or warrior depictions, she shares some similarities with Durga, as both appear with multiple arms carrying various weapons while riding an animal or chariot.

== Iconography ==
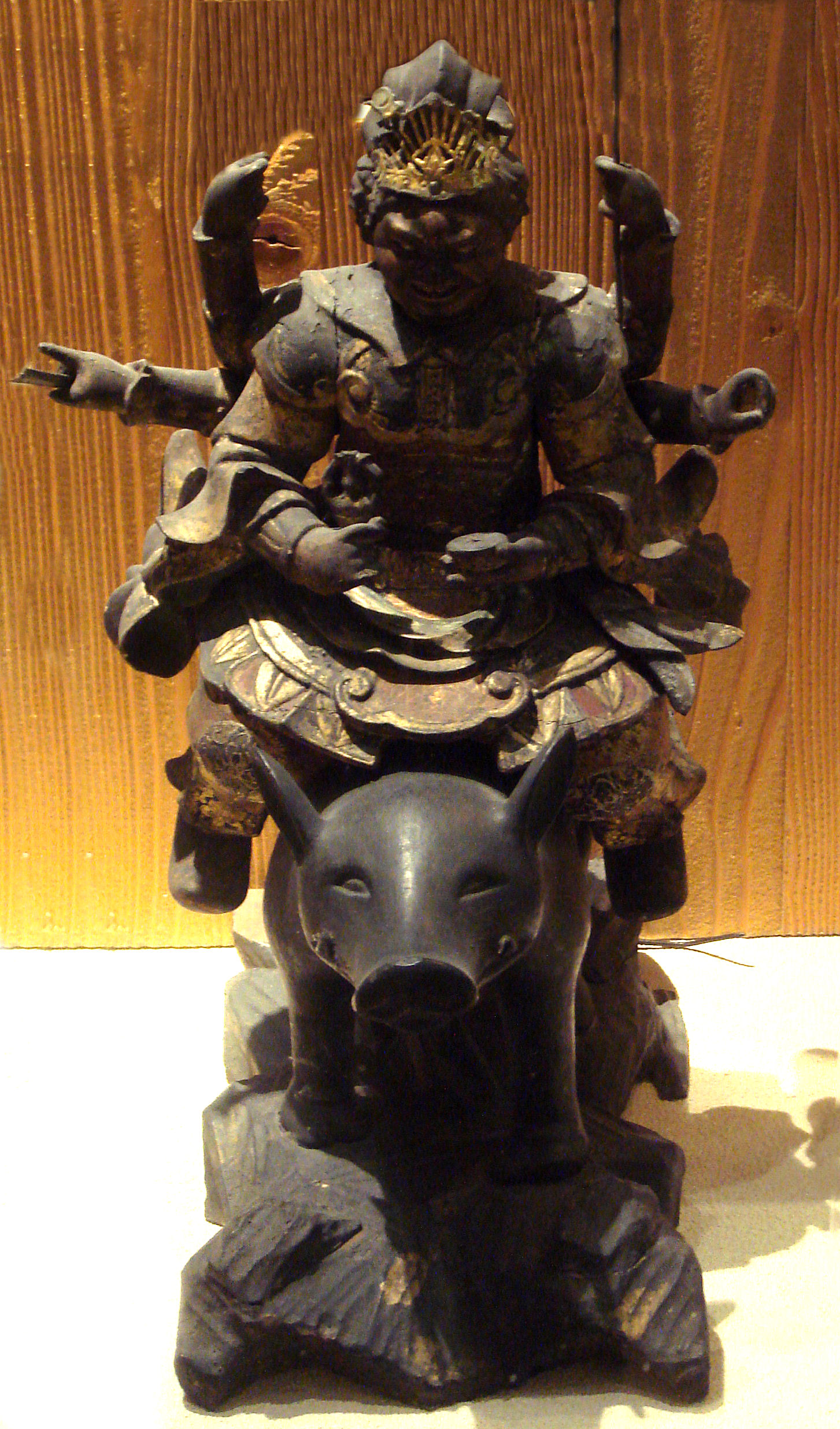
Mārīcī has been a popular goddess – in some cases a god – in East Asian Buddhism. She is typically depicted as multi-armed and riding a boar, or a chariot pulled by boars.

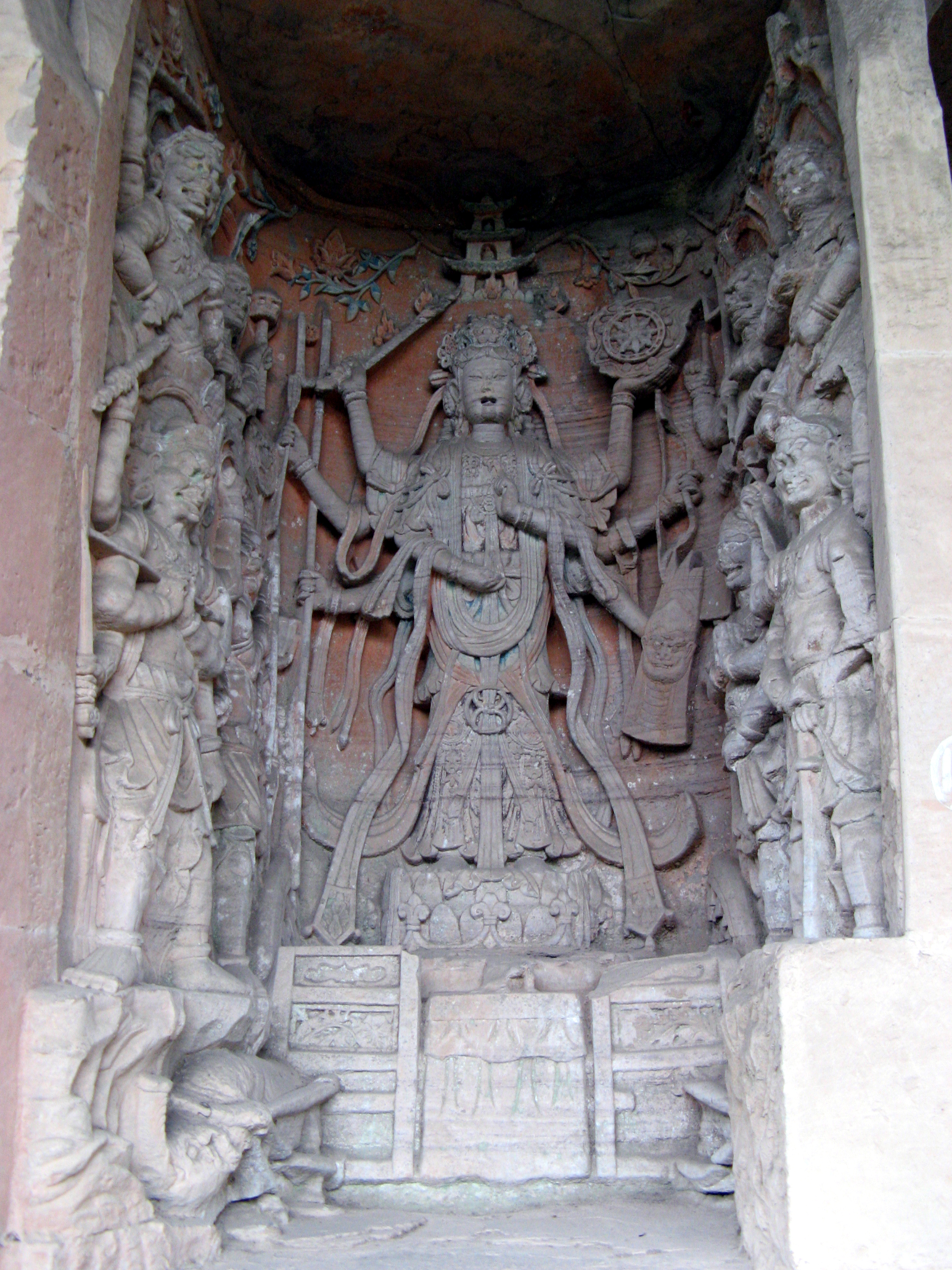
Mārīcī wielding various dharma instruments in the Dazu Rock Carvings in Dazu District, Chongqing, China. Dated to the Song dynasty (960–1279).

Mārīcī is depicted in several ways. Some examples included:

- As a man or woman on an open lotus, the lotus occasionally is perched on the back of seven sows.
- As a male deity, often with two or six arms, riding a boar.
- Riding a fiery chariot pulled by seven savage boars or sows.
- As a multi-armed woman with a different weapon in each hand, standing or sitting on the back of a boar.
- As having three faces and six or eight arms.

In Tibetan literature, the Bari Gyatsa contains five different descriptions of Mārīcī:

- Oḍḍiyāna Mārīcī
- Kalpa Ukta Mārīcī
- Kalpa Ukta Vidhinā Sita Mārīcī
- Aśokakāntā Mārīcī
- Oḍḍiyāna Krama Mārīcī

The Drub Tab Gyatso has six descriptions:

- White with five faces and ten hands
- Yellow with three faces and eight hands
- Yellow with three faces and eight hands
- Dharmadhātu Īśvarī, red with six faces and twelve hands
- Picumī, yellow with three faces and eight hands
- Red with three faces and twelve hands

The Nartang Gyatsa and Rinjung of Taranata describe one form.

The Vajravali and Mitra Gyatsa describe a mandala of Mārīcī that includes twenty-five surrounding figures.

This is not an exhaustive list, and many more depictions of Mārīcī exist throughout the Buddhist world.

== In Tibetan Buddhism ==
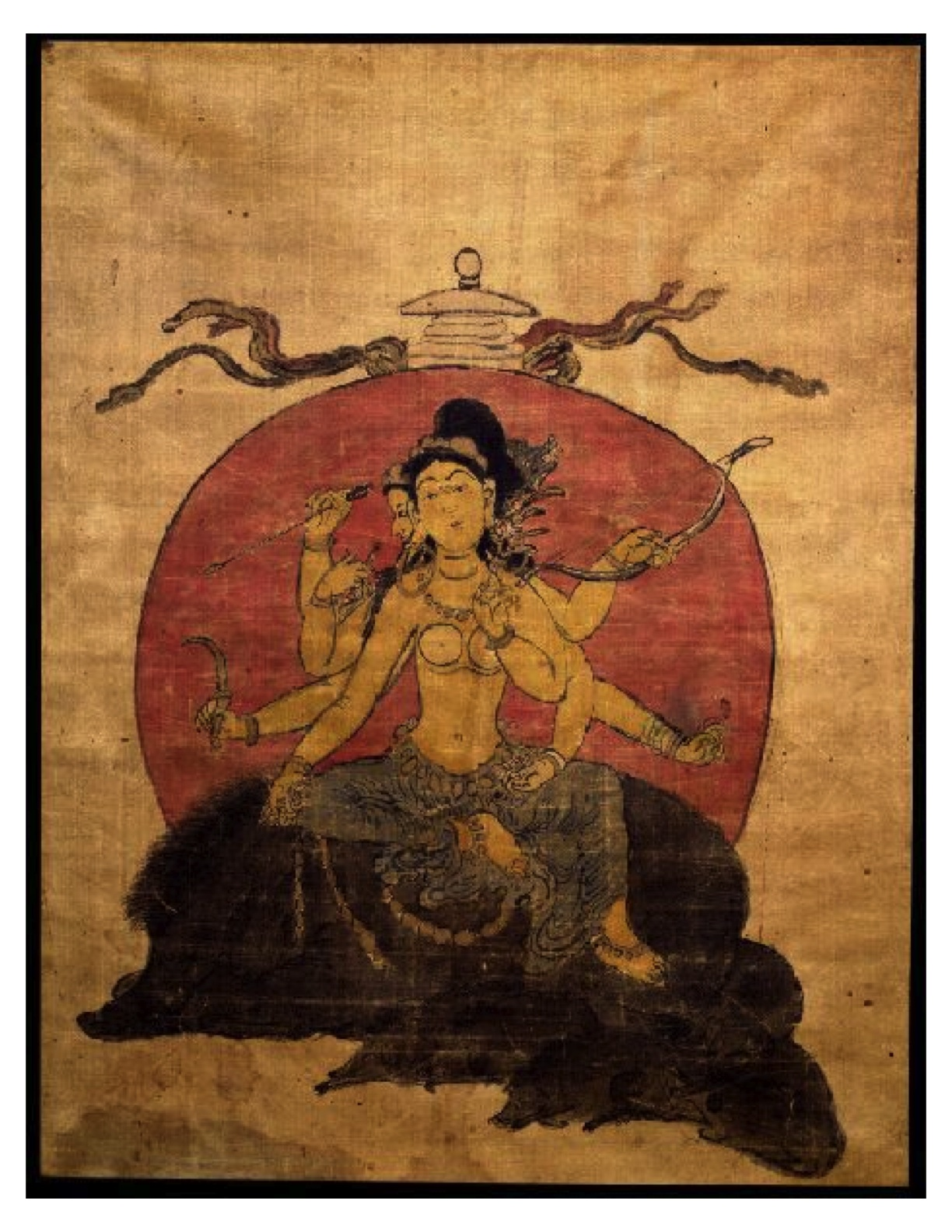
Mārīcī painted 1600–1699, Central Tibet. by Choying Dorje.

Three texts are preserved in the Kriya Tantra of the Tibetan Kangyur in which Mārīcī (Tibetan: Ozer Chenma) is the primary subject:

- The Incantation of Mārīcī (Skt. ārya mārīcī nāma dhāraṇī, Wyl. 'phags ma 'od zer can zhes bya ba'i gzungs, D 564)
- The Sovereign Practices Extracted from the Tantra of Māyāmārīcī (Skt. Māyāmārīcījāta tantrād uddhitaṃ kalparājā, Wyl. sgyu ma'i 'od zer can 'byung ba'i rgyud las phyung ba'i rtog pa'i rgyal po’’, D 565)
- The Seven Hundred Practices of Mārīcī from the Tantras (Skt. ārya mārīcī maṇḍalavidhi mārīcījāta dvādaśasahasra uddhitaṃ kalpa hṛdaya saptaśata, Wyl. ‘phags ma 'od zer can gyi dkyil 'khor gyi cho ga 'od zer can 'byung ba'i rgyud stong phrag bcu gnyis pa las phyung ba'i rtog pa'i snying po bdun brgya pa’’, D 566)

Several more texts may be found in the Dergé Tengyur commentaries.

Ozer Chenma is also sometimes seen as a form of Tara. In the Nyingma tradition of the 21 Taras, she is the 21st Tara.

A key mantra for her is:

Sanskrit: Oṃ mārīcyai svāhā Tibetan: om ma ri tsyai soha (ཨོཾ་མཱ་རི་ཙྱཻ་སྭཱ་ཧཱ།)

=== Dzogchen ===
Ozer Chenma is particularly important in Nyingma schools Dzogchen tradition. Her importance is due to the symbolism of the sun and its rays for Dzogchen thought, as well as the use of the sun as an aid in the Dzogchen practice of thogal. The Self-Arisen Vidya Tantra states: "In order to demonstrate the source of light rays, there is the tantra known as the Marici Tantra." In this tradition, her main seed syllable is MUM, and her mantra is "OM MARI ZEYE MUM SVAHA".

== In East Asian Buddhism ==
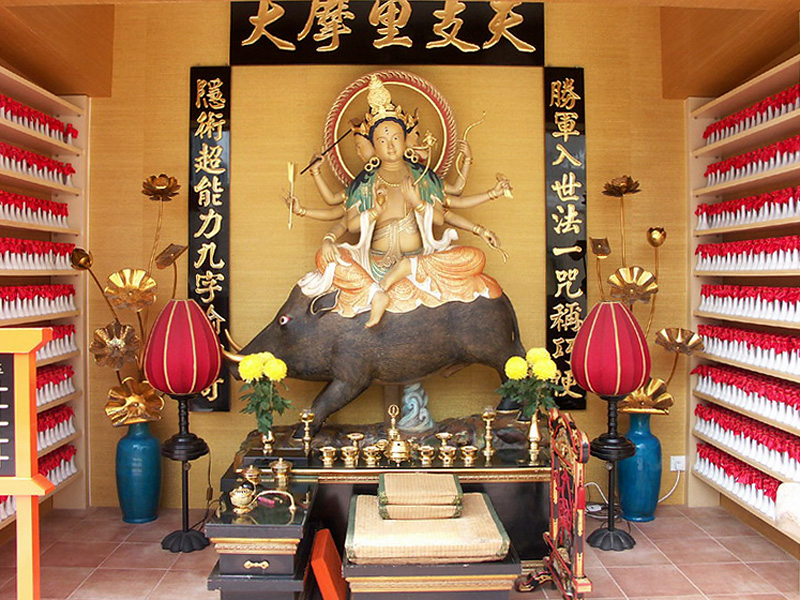
Mārīcī with eight-arms and four faces riding on a boar – Hongfashan Temple, Hong Kong

In China, Mārīcī Bodhisattva (Chinese: 摩利支天菩薩; Pinyin: Mólìzhītiān Púsà) is worshiped as both a Buddhist and Taoist deity. She is highly revered in Esoteric Buddhism. She is often depicted with three eyes on each of her three faces and four arms on each side of her body. Two of her hands are held together, and the other six hold a sun, moon, bell, golden seal, bow, and halberd. She is either standing or sitting on a lotus or pig, or on a lotus on top of seven pigs. She is celebrated on the 9th day of the 9th lunar month. As one of the Twenty-Four Devas, she is usually enshrined along with the other devas in the Mahavira Hall of most Chinese Buddhist temples, flanking the central altar.

Mārīcī is sometimes considered an incarnation of the Bodhisattva Cundī, with whom she shares similar iconography. She is also worshiped as the goddess of light and the guardian of all nations, whom she protects from the fury of war.

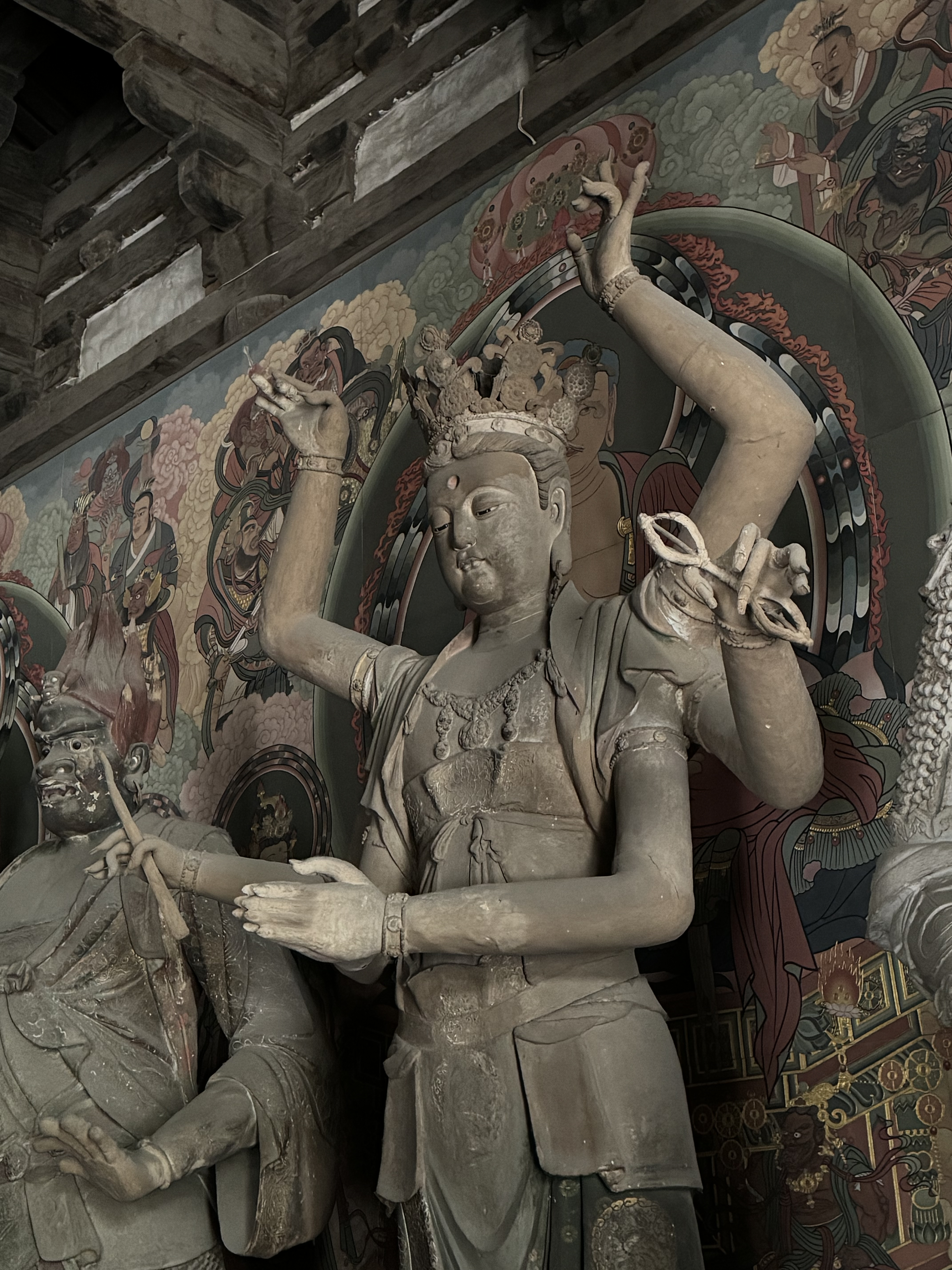
Ming dynasty (1368–1644) statue of Mārīcī as one of the Twenty-Four Devas of Chinese Buddhism at Shanhua Temple in Datong, China

=== Japan ===
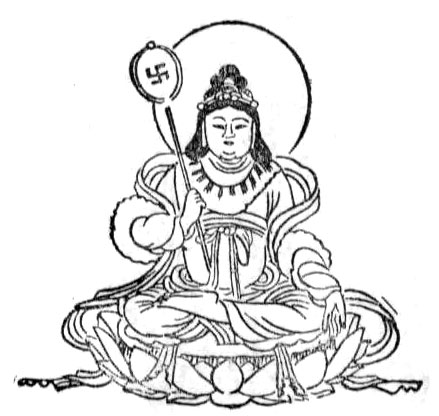
Japanese illustration of Mārīcī, holding a heavenly fan with swastika

Mārīcī, an important deity in the Shingon and Tendai schools, was adopted by the Samurai in the 8th century CE as a protector and patron.

While devotions to Mārīcī predate Zen Buddhism, they appear to use a similar meditative model. It was thought that in a meditative state, warriors would lose interest in issues of victory and defeat or life and death, leading them to become better warriors.

Devotion to Mārīcī was expected to achieve selflessness and compassion through mastery of the self. Some martial arts schools also worshiped Mārīcī as a guardian deity of their lineage. For example, the school of Tenshin Shōden Katori Shintō-ryū's blood pledge chart (Keppan) ordered the disciples to submit to Futsunushi-no-Mikoto and accept Mārīcī's punishment if they acted against school rules.

Samurai would invoke Mārīcī at sunrise to achieve victory. Mārīcī, meaning "light" or mirage, was invoked to escape the notice of one's enemies. But, as the goddess of illusion and invisibility, Marishiten was also particularly revered by the ninja, who recited her mantra to acquire her power of invisibility.

Mārīcī was also worshiped in the later Edo period as a goddess of wealth and prosperity by the merchant class, alongside Daikokuten (大黒天) and Benzaiten (弁財天) as part of a trio of "three deities" (三天 Santen). Her cult peaked in the Edo era but declined after that due to the dismantling of the feudal system, the abolishment of the samurai class, and the rising popularity of Benzaiten, who, in modernity, has largely replaced her as an object of veneration.

=== Gallery ===
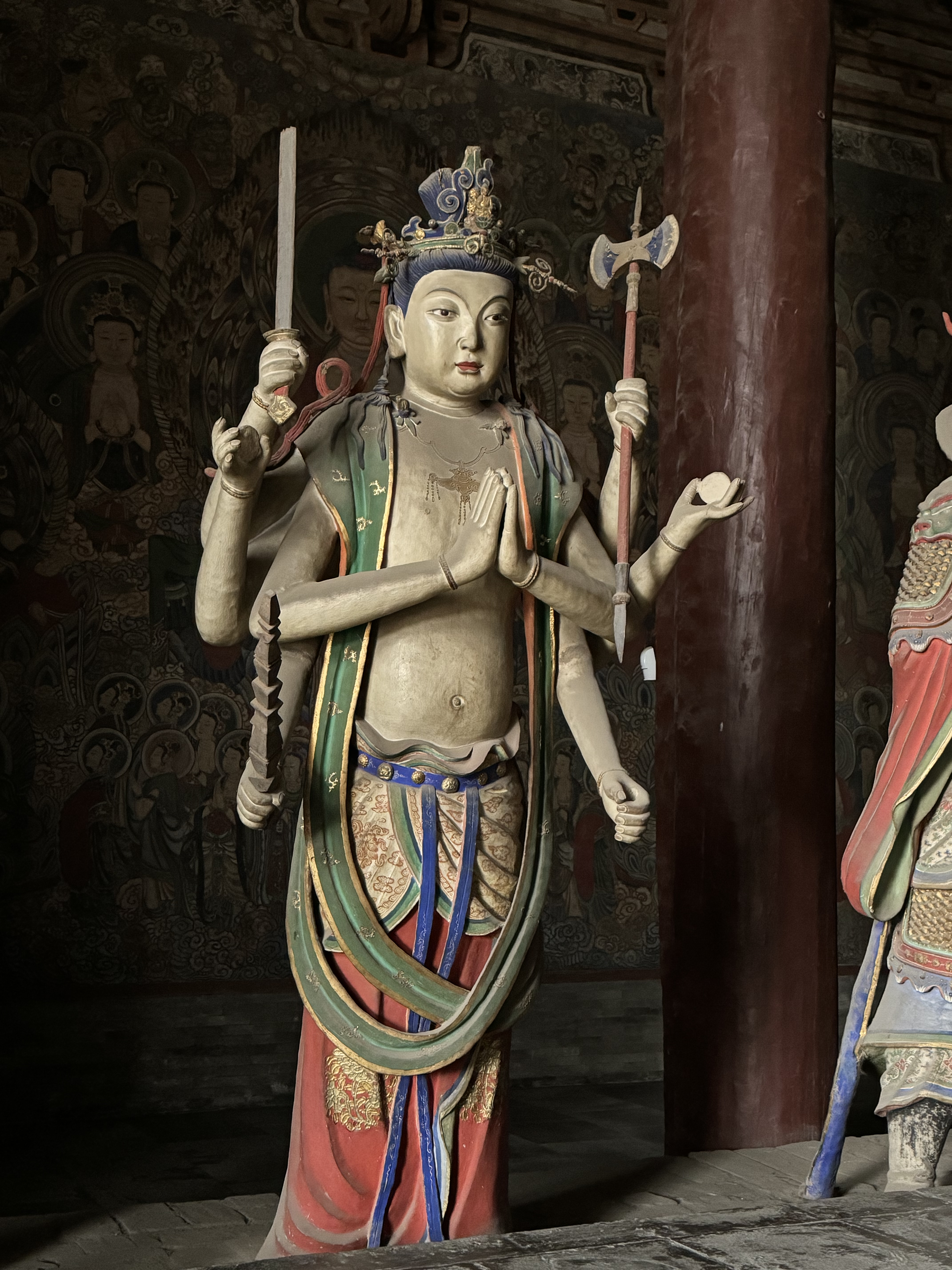
Ming dynasty (1368–1644) statue of Mārīcī as one of the Twenty-Four Devas of Chinese Buddhism at Huayan Temple in Datong, China

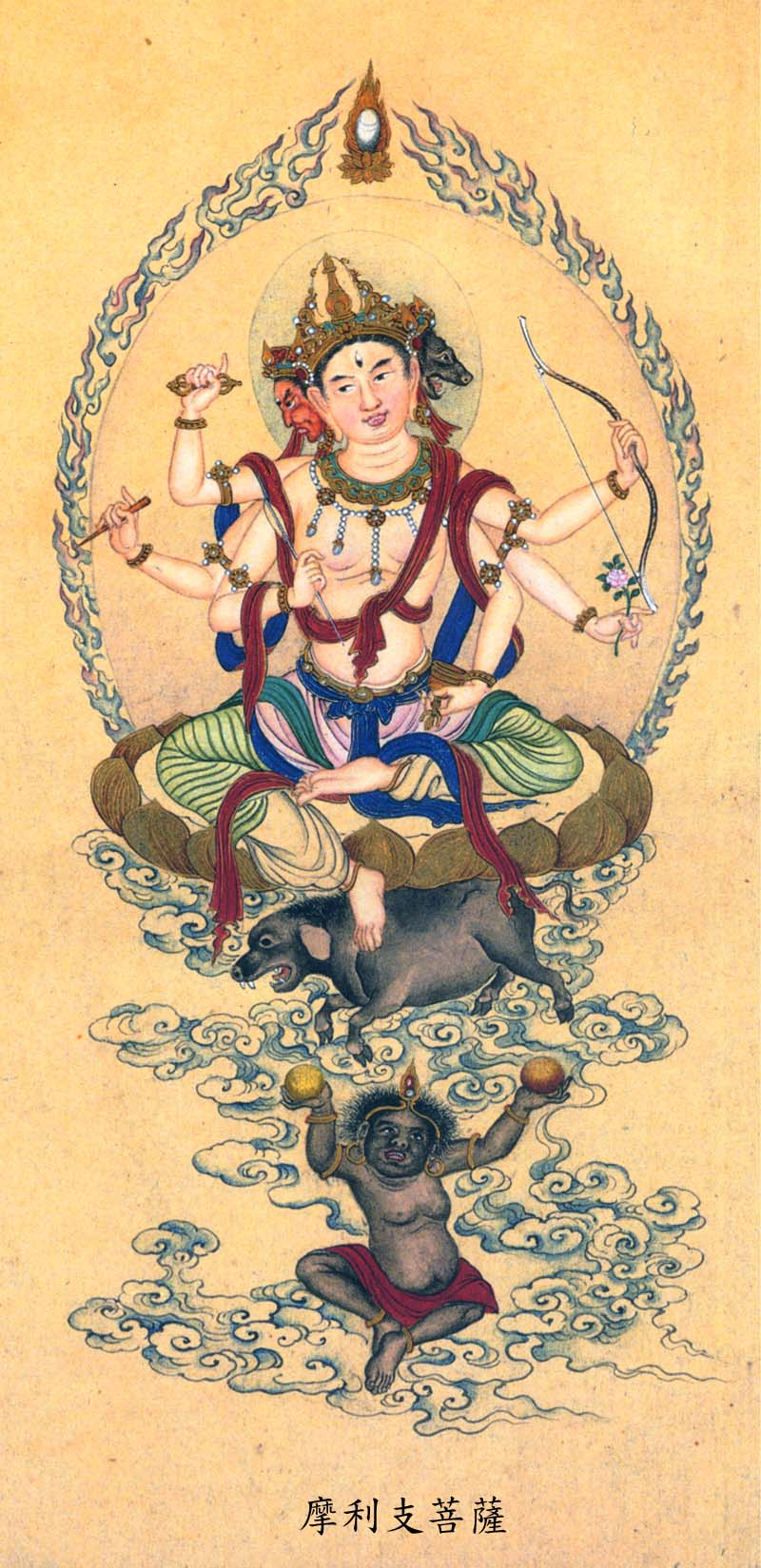
Marici by 丁觀鵬 Ding Guanpeng (Qing dynasty), 1767

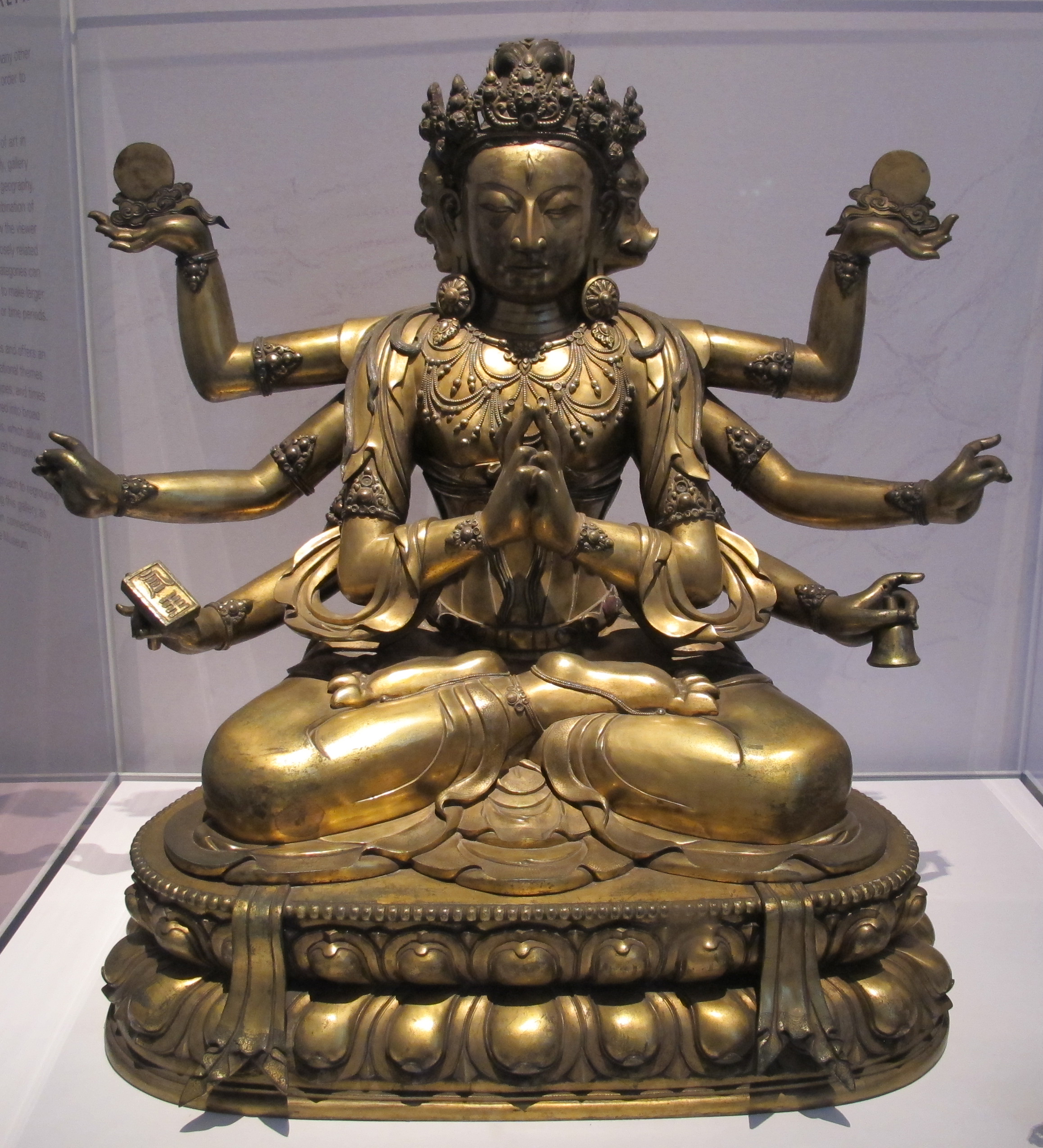
Marichi statue, Qing dynasty, Brooklyn Museum

== In Taoism ==
In Taoism, Doumu (Ch: 斗母元君, Dǒu Mǔ Yuánjūn. "Dipper Mother") remains a popular deity and is often referred to as the Queen of Heaven (Chinese: 天后; pinyin: Tiān Hòu) and is widely worshiped as the Goddess of Beidou (the Chinese equivalent of Ursa Major except that it also includes 2 "attendant" stars). She is also revered as the mother of the Nine Emperor Gods who are represented by the nine stars in the Beidou constellation. Legend has it that a queen bathed in a pond one spring day. Upon entering the bath, she suddenly felt "moved," and nine lotus buds rose from the pond. Each of these lotus buds opened to reveal a star, which became the Beidou constellation. She is also identified with Cundi and with Mahēśvarī, the wife of Maheśvara, and therefore also has the title Mātrikā (佛母 Fo mǔ), Mother of the Myriad Buddhas.

She is worshiped today in Taoist temples like the White Cloud Temple and the Tou Mu Kung Temple which have both Taoist and Buddhist influences.

Doumu is chronicled in three canonical Daozang texts, from which the above stories have been extracted. These three texts were compiled during the Song-Yuan, according to each entry's preface in the Zhengtong daozang (Numbered according to Schipper, 1975). They are Dz 45: 'Yùqīng Wúshàng Língbǎo Zìrán Běidǒu Běnshēng Jīng' 玉清無上靈寶自然北斗本生經, True and Unsurpassed Lingbao Scripture from the Yuqing Heaven on the Spontaneous Origin of the Northern Dipper; Dz 621: Tàishàng Xuánlíng Dǒumǔ Dàshèng Yuánjūn Běnmìng Yánshēng Xīnjīng 太上玄靈斗姆大聖元君本命延生心經, Heart Scripture of Original Destiny and Extending Life of the Great Sagely Goddess Dipper Mother; and Dz 1452: Xiāntiān Dǒumǔ Qíngào Xuánkē 先天斗姆秦告玄科, Mysterious Rite for Petitioning the Dipper Mother of Former Heavens.

== See also ==
- List of solar deities
- Lunar deity
- Marichi Thakurani
- Vajravārāhī
