= Eight Legions =

Group of Buddhist deities whose function is to protect the Dharma

Translations of Eight Legions
- English: Eight Legions
- Sanskrit: अष्टसेना Aṣṭasenā
- Chinese: 八部眾; 天龍八部 (Pinyin: Bābùzhòng; Tiānlóngbābù)
- Japanese: 八部衆; 天龍八部衆 (Rōmaji: Hachibushū; Tenryūhachibu)
- Korean: 팔부신장; 천룡팔부 (RR: Palbusinjang; Cheonryongpalbu)
- Tagalog: Astasena
- Tibetan: ལྷ་འདྲེ་སྡེ་བརྒྱད་ Wylie: lha srin sde brgyad
- Vietnamese: Bát Bộ Chúng; Thiên Long Bát Bộ

The Eight Legions (Sanskrit: अष्टसेना, Aṣṭasenā; 八部衆) are a group of Buddhist deities whose function is to protect the Dharma. These beings are common among the audience addressed by the Buddha in Mahāyāna sūtras, making appearances in such scriptures as the Lotus Sutra and the Golden Light Sutra. They are also referred to as the "Eight Legions of Devas and Nāgas" (天龍八部).

Asuras are also listed here as protectors of Dharma in the same sense as demigods are referred as "asuratvam" (holy) in Rigvedic "Hymn to all gods" where devas are related to "asuras" (thus, protectors of Dharma). Related word "ahura" in Zoroastrianism also means "god".

== Etymology ==
The name aṣṭasenā (अष्टसेना) is composed of two Sanskrit terms.

Aṣṭa (अष्ट) means eight, with connections to the Latin octo and the Persian hašt (هشت). Senā (सेना) means legion, but can be rendered army, general, warrior and the like. Yet for the sake of accuracy contrary to the custom, each legion has a unique standard/banner and is composed just of several thousand foot soldiers. For that size of a military unit there is a fitting Sanskrit term "Dhvajinī", i.e. "body of troops bearing a standard". "Sena" is better to translate as "army" due to the fact that enormous Kuru and Pāṇḍava troops that gathered on the battlefield were called "kurupāṇḍava-sena" (one can't label two huge military forces fighting each other as just one legion), and more than that, all wars in India are patronized by the god of war Kārtikeya who probably plays both sides in any conflict if adversary combatants worship devas. His wife's name is Sena, a goddess, commonly known as Deva-Sena, the personified armament of the gods. There were plenty of legions in India serving various kings and lords, but all military forces as a whole could be figuratively named an army, i.e. "Sena" - the Shakti through which the god of war imposed his will.

== Summary ==
The Eight Legions have their origins in ancient India as gods who belong to several domains. Many of these gods are among those spirits who are found in the lower heavens of Cāturmahārājakāyika and the Asura realm, and as such largely consist of nature spirits. While the list of figures within this category vary, the most common are as follows:

- Deva (Chinese: 天眾; pinyin: Tiānzhòng; Japanese: 天部; rōmaji: tenbu; Korean: 천중; romaja: cheonjung; Vietnamese: Thiên, Thiên chúng; Tagalog: Deva, Standard Tibetan: ལྷ། lha, Thai: เทพ)
- Nāga (Chinese: 龍眾; pinyin: Lóngzhòng; Japanese: 竜; rōmaji: ryū; Korean: 용; romaja: yong; Vietnamese: Long, Long chúng; Tagalog: Naga, Standard Tibetan: ཀླུ། klu, Thai: นาค )
- Yakṣa (Chinese and Japanese: 夜叉; pinyin: Yèchā; rōmaji: yasha; Korean: 야차; romaja: yacha; Vietnamese: Dạ Xoa; Tagalog: Yaksa, Standard Tibetan: གནོད་སྦྱིན། gnod sbyin, Thai: ยักษ์ )
- Gandharva (Chinese and Japanese: 乾闥婆; pinyin: Gāntàpó; rōmaji: kendatsuba; Korean: 간다르바; romaja: gandareuba; Vietnamese: Càn Thát Bà; Tagalog: Gandhalba, Standard Tibetan: དྲི་ཟ། dri za, Thai: คนธรรพ์)
- Asura (Chinese and Japanese: 阿修羅; pinyin: Āxiūluó; rōmaji: ashura; Korean: 아수라; romaja: asura; Vietnamese: A Tu La; Tagalog: Asula, Standard Tibetan: ལྷ་མ་ཡིན། lha ma yin, Thai: อสูร)
- Garuḍa (Chinese: 迦樓羅; pinyin: Jiālóuluó; Japanese: 迦楼羅; rōmaji: karura; Korean: 가루다; romaja: garuda; Vietnamese: Ca Lâu La; Tagalog: Garuda, Standard Tibetan: ཁྱུང་། Khyung, Thai: ครุฑ)
- Kiṁnara (Chinese and Japanese: 緊那羅; pinyin: Jǐnnàluó; rōmaji: kinnara; Korean: 긴나라; romaja: ginnara; Vietnamese: Khẩn Na La; Tagalog: Kinnara, Standard Tibetan: མིའམ་ཅི། mi'am ci, Thai: กินนร)
- Mahoraga (Chinese and Japanese: 摩睺羅伽; pinyin: Móhóuluójiā; rōmaji: magoraga; Korean: 마후라가; romaja: mahuraga; Vietnamese: Ma Hầu La Già; Tagalog: Maholaga, Standard Tibetan: ལྟོ་འཕྱེ་ཆེན་པོ། lto 'phye chen po, Thai: มโหรคะ)

== Variations ==
At Kōfuku-ji in Nara, Japan, there is a famous group of statues that represent the Eight Legions. Some of these figures differ from the common list. Their names in Japanese are as follows:

- Gobujō (五部浄, Śuddhāvāsa, a deva and personification of the heaven of the fourth dhyāna. There are five gods who reside here, all anāgāmins: Īśvara, Samantakusuma, Raśmimālin, Manojava, and Svaraviśruti.)
- Sagara (沙羯羅, Sāgara, the Nāga King)
- Kubanda (鳩槃荼, Kumbhāṇḍa)
- Kendatsuba (乾闥婆, Gandharva)
- Ashura (阿修羅, Asura)
- Karura (迦楼羅, Garuḍa)
- Kinnara (緊那羅, Kiṁnara)
- Hibakara (畢婆迦羅, Mahoraga)

There is another list of eight beings, the Hachibukikishū (八部鬼衆), who belong to an overlapping, but distinct category.

== See also ==
- Dharmapala
- Lokapala
- Demi-Gods and Semi-Devils - novel by Jin Yong, titled after the Eight Legions in Chinese
