= Creator in Buddhism =

Buddhist views on the belief in a creator deity, or any eternal divine personal being

Generally speaking, Buddhism is a religion that does not include the belief in a creator deity. As such, it has often been described as either (non-materialistic) atheism or as nontheism. However, other scholars have challenged these descriptions since some forms of Buddhism do posit different kinds of transcendent, unborn, and unconditioned ultimate realities (e.g., Buddha-nature).

Buddhist teachings state that there are divine beings called devas (sometimes translated as 'gods') and other Buddhist deities, heavens, and rebirths in its doctrine of saṃsāra, or cyclical rebirth. Buddhism teaches that none of these gods are creators or eternal beings. However, they can live very long lives. In Buddhism, the devas are also trapped in the cycle of rebirth and are not necessarily virtuous. Thus, while Buddhism includes multiple "gods", its main focus is not on them. Peter Harvey calls this "trans-polytheism".

Buddhist texts also posit that mundane deities, such as Mahabrahma, are misconstrued to be creators. Buddhist ontology follows the doctrine of dependent origination, whereby all phenomena arise in dependence on other phenomena, hence no primal unmoved mover could be acknowledged or discerned. Gautama Buddha, in the early Buddhist texts, is also shown as stating that he saw no single beginning to the universe.

During the medieval period, Buddhist philosophers like Vasubandhu developed extensive refutations of creationism and Hindu theism. Because of this, some modern scholars, such as Matthew Kapstein, have described this later stage of Buddhism as anti-theistic. Buddhist anti-theistic writings were also common during the modern era, in response to the presence of Christian missionaries and their critiques of Buddhism.

Despite this, some writers, such as B. Alan Wallace and Douglas Duckworth, have noted that certain doctrines in Vajrayana Buddhism can be seen as being similar to certain theistic doctrines like Neoplatonic theology and pantheism. Various scholars have also compared East Asian Buddhist doctrines regarding the supreme and eternal Buddhas like Vairocana or Amitabha with certain forms of theism, such as pantheism and process theism.

== Early Buddhist texts ==
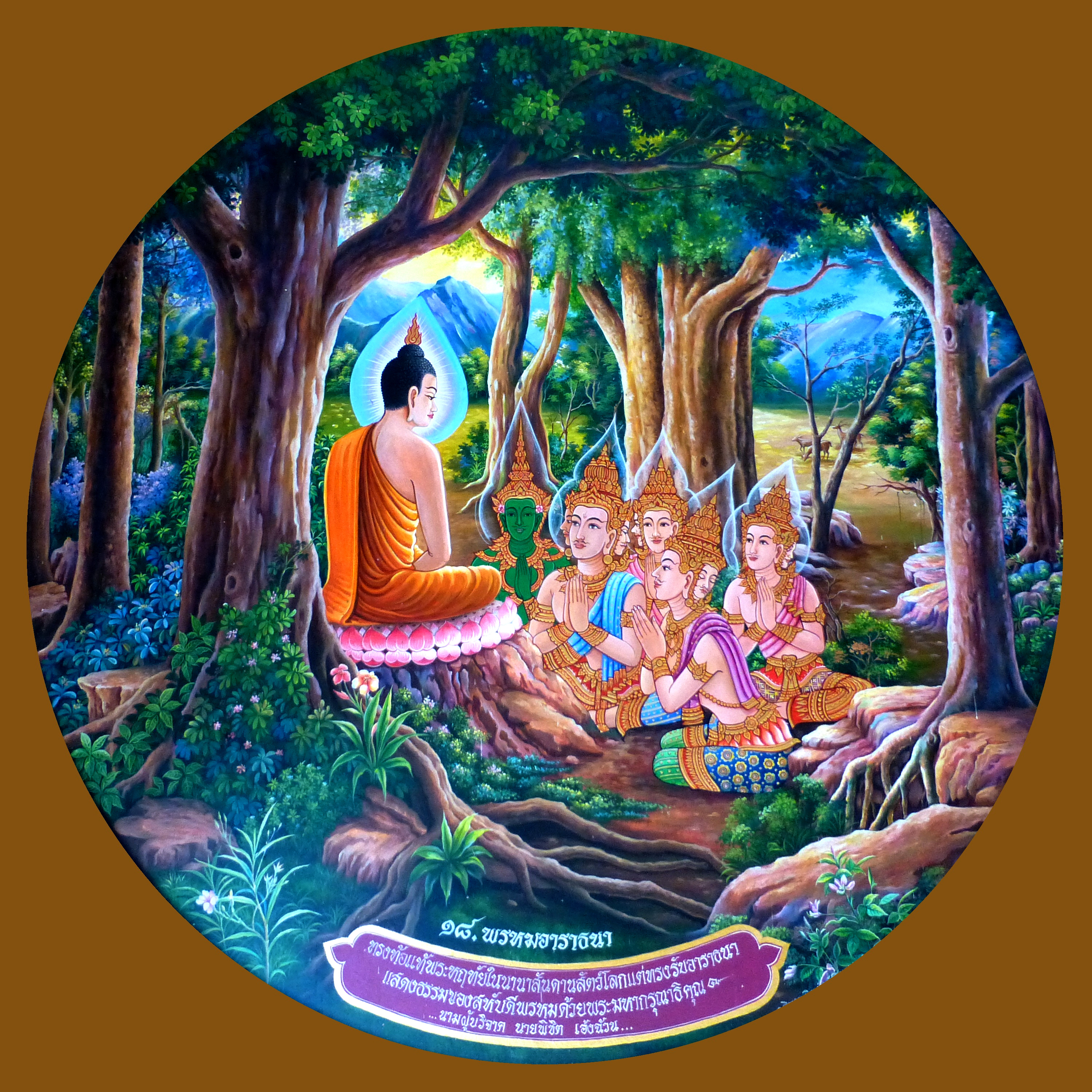
The deva Brahma Sahampati asks the Buddha to teach. Buddhism accepts the existence of devas (celestial beings, literally "shining ones"), but these beings are not creator gods, nor are they eternal (they suffer and die).

Damien Keown notes that in the Saṃyutta Nikāya, the Buddha sees the cycle of rebirths as stretching back "many hundreds of thousands of aeons without discernible beginning." Saṃyutta Nikāya 15:1 and 15:2 states: "This samsara is without discoverable beginning. A first point is not discerned of beings roaming and wandering on hindered by ignorance and fettered by craving."

According to Buddhologist Richard Hayes, the early Buddhist Nikaya literature treats the question of the existence of a creator god "primarily from either an epistemological point of view or a moral point of view". In these texts, the Buddha is portrayed not as a creator-denying atheist who claims to be able to prove such a god's nonexistence, but rather his focus is other teachers' claims that their teachings lead to the highest good.

According to Hayes, in the Tevijja Sutta (DN 13), there is an account of a dispute between two brahmins about how best to reach union with Brahma (Brahmasahavyata), who is seen as the highest god over whom no other being has mastery and who sees all. However, after being questioned by the Buddha, it is revealed that they do not have any direct experience of this Brahma. The Buddha calls their religious goal laughable, vain, and empty.

Hayes also notes that in the early texts, the Buddha is not depicted as an atheist, but more as a sceptic who is against religious speculations, including speculations about a creator god. Citing the Devadaha Sutta (Majjhima Nikaya 101), Hayes states, "while the reader is left to conclude that it is attachment rather than God, actions in past lives, fate, type of birth or efforts in this life that is responsible for our experiences of sorrow, no systematic argument is given in an attempt to disprove the existence of God."

Narada Thera also notes that the Buddha specifically calls out the doctrine of creation by a supreme deity (termed Ishvara) for criticism in the Aṅguttara Nikāya. This doctrine of creation by a supreme lord is defined as follows: "Whatever happiness or pain or neutral feeling this person experiences, all that is due to the creation of a supreme deity (issaranimmāṇahetu)." The Buddha criticized this view because he saw it as a fatalistic teaching that would lead to inaction or laziness:

"So, then, owing to the creation of a supreme deity, men will become murderers, thieves, unchaste, liars, slanderers, abusive, babblers, covetous, malicious and perverse in view. Thus for those who fall back on the creation of a god as the essential reason, there is neither desire nor effort nor necessity to do this deed or abstain from that deed."

In another early sutta (Devadahasutta, Majjhima Nikāya 101), the Buddha sees the pain and suffering that is experienced by certain individuals as indicating that if they were created by a god, then this is likely to be an evil god:

"If the pleasure and pain that beings feel are caused by the creative act of a Supreme God, then the Nigaṇṭhas surely must have been created by an evil Supreme God, since they now feel such painful, racking, piercing feelings."

=== High gods who are mistaken as creator ===
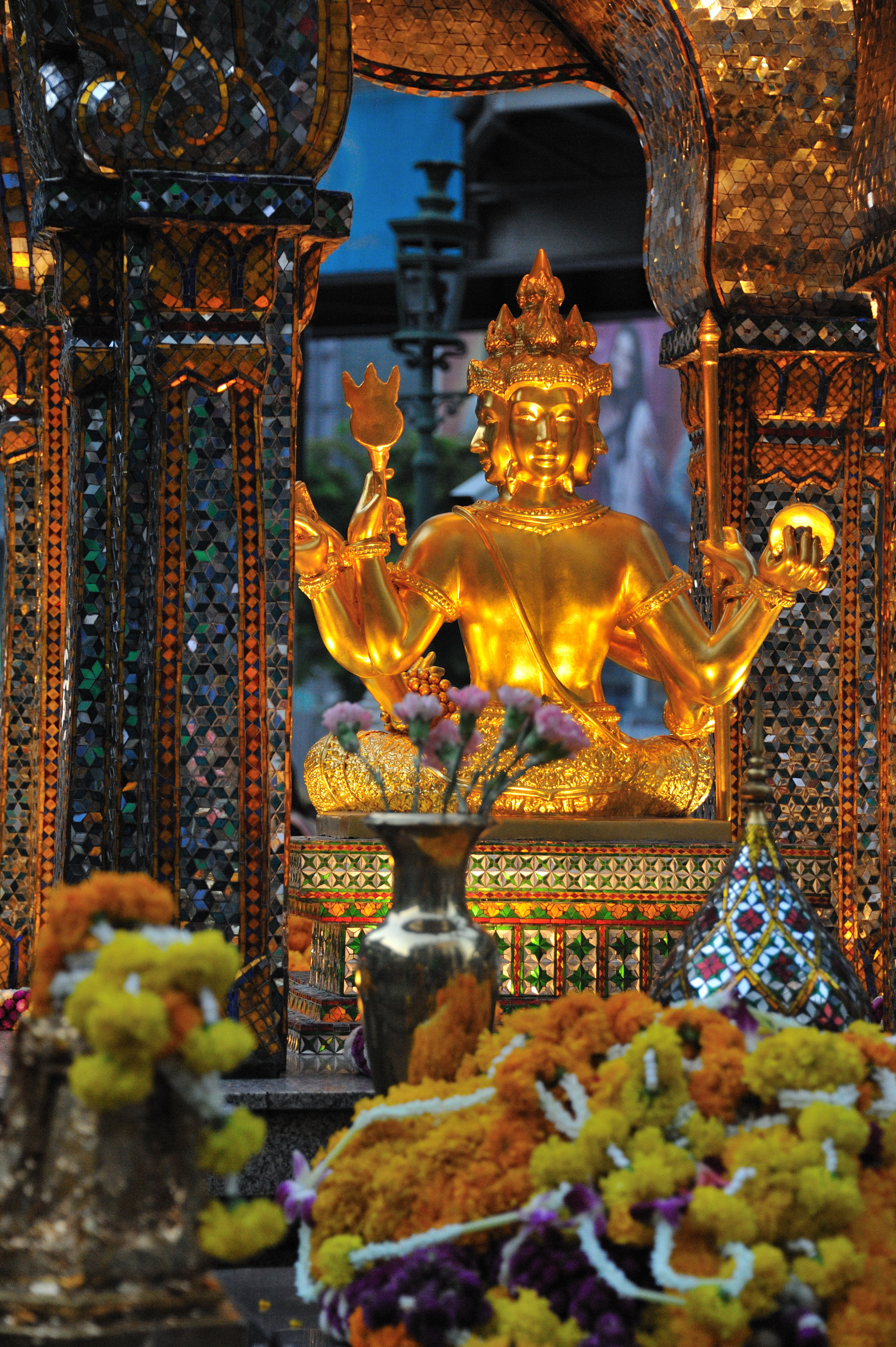
The high god Brahma is often seen as an object of devotion in Buddhism, but he is not seen as a creator, nor does he have eternal life. This depiction of the deity is from the Erawan Shrine in Bangkok, Thailand.

According to Peter Harvey, Buddhism assumes that the universe has no ultimate beginning to it and thus sees no need for a creator god. In the early texts, the nearest term to this concept is "Great Brahma" (Maha Brahma), such as in Digha Nikaya 1.18. However, "[w]hile being kind and compassionate, none of the brahmās are world-creators."

In the Pali Canon, Buddhism includes the concept of reborn gods. According to this theory, periodically, the physical world system ends and beings of that world system are reborn as gods in lower heavens. This too ends, according to Buddhist cosmology, and god Mahabrahma is then born, who is alone. He longs for the presence of others, and the other gods are reborn as his ministers and companions. In Buddhist suttas, such as DN 1, Mahabrahma forgets his past lives and falsely believes himself to be the Creator, Maker, All-Seeing, Lord. This belief, state the Buddhist texts, is then shared by other gods. Eventually, however, one of the gods dies and is reborn as human, with the power to remember his previous life. He teaches what he remembers from his previous life in lower heaven, that Mahabrahma is the Creator. It is this that leads to the human belief in a creator, according to the Pali Canon.

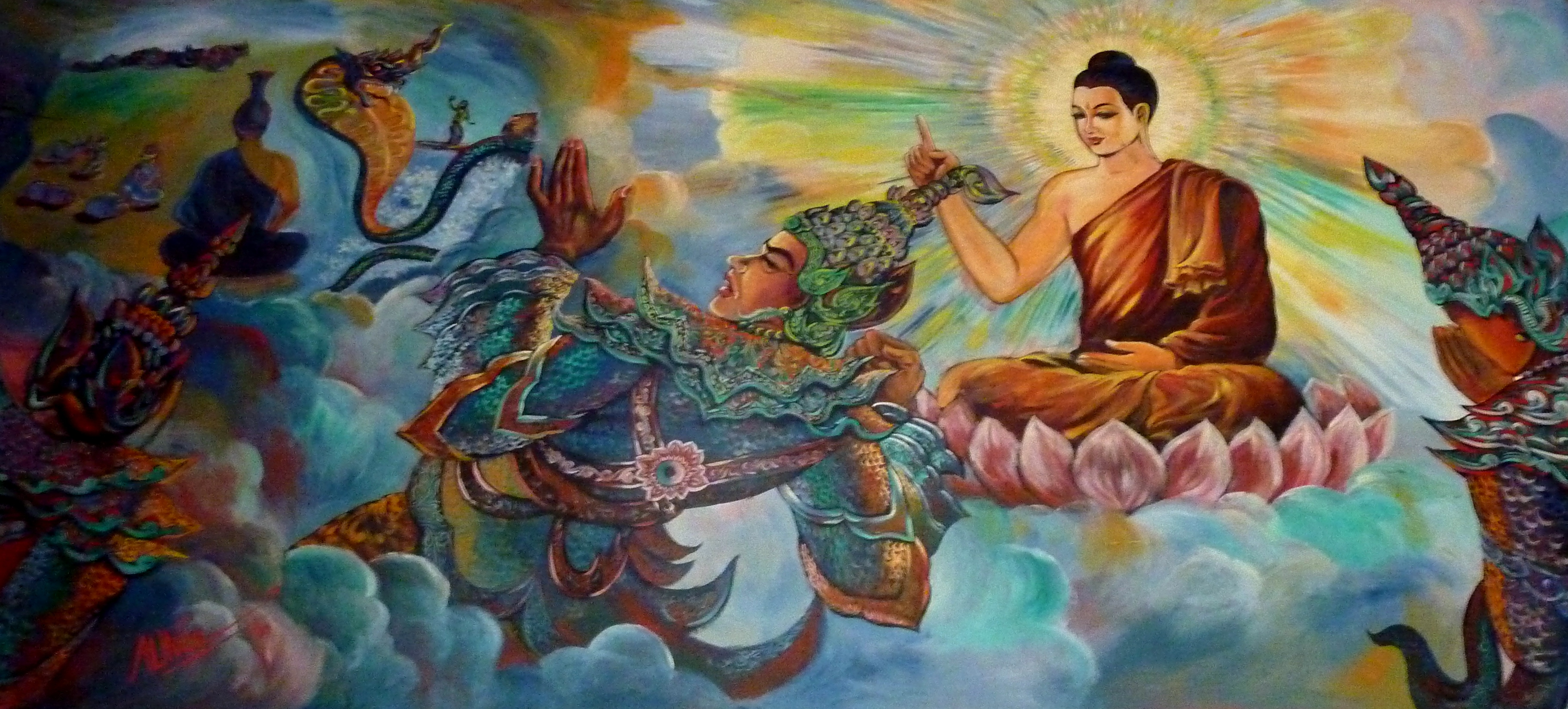
A depiction of the Buddha's defeat of Baka Brahma, a brahma god who mistakenly believed he was the all-powerful creator. Wat Olak Madu, Kedah, Malaysia.

A similar story of a high god (brahma) who mistakes himself as the all-powerful creator can be seen in the Brahma-nimantanika Sutta (MN 49). In this sutta, the Buddha displays his superior knowledge by explaining how a high god named Baka Brahma, who believes himself to be supremely powerful, actually does not know of certain spiritual realms. The Buddha also demonstrates his superior psychic power by disappearing from Baka Brahma's sight, to a realm that he cannot reach, and then challenges him to do the same. Baka Brahma fails in this, demonstrating the Buddha's superiority. The text also depicts Mara, an evil trickster figure, as attempting to support the Brahma's misconception of himself. As noted by Michael D. Nichols, MN 49 seems to show that "belief in an eternal creator figure is a devious ploy put forward by the Evil One to mislead humanity, and the implication is that Brahmins who believe in the power and permanence of Brahma have fallen for it."

== The Problem of Evil in the Jatakas ==
Some stories in the Buddhist Jataka collections outline a critique of a Creator deity that is similar to the Problem of Evil.

One Jataka story (VI.208) states:

If Brahma is lord of the whole world and Creator of the multitude of beings, then why has he ordained misfortune in the world without making the whole world happy; or for what purpose has he made the world full of injustice, falsehood and conceit; or is the lord of beings evil in that he ordained injustice when there could have been justice?

The Pali Bhūridatta Jātaka (No. 543) has the bodhisattva (future Buddha) state:

"He who has eyes can see the sickening sight,
Why does not Brahmā set his creatures right?
If his wide power no limit can restrain,
Why is his hand so rarely spread to bless?
Why are his creatures all condemned to pain?
Why does he not to all give happiness?
Why do fraud, lies, and ignorance prevail?
Why triumphs falsehood—truth and justice fail?
I count you Brahmā one th'unjust among,
Who made a world in which to shelter wrong."

In the Pali Mahābodhi Jātaka (No. 528), the bodhisattva says:

"If there exists some Lord all powerful to fulfil
In every creature bliss or woe, and action good or ill;
That Lord is stained with sin.
Man does but work his will."

== Medieval philosophers ==
While Early Buddhism was not as concerned with critiquing concepts of God or Īśvara (since theism was not as prominent in India until the medieval era), medieval Indian Buddhists engaged much more thoroughly with the emerging Hindu theisms (mainly by attempting to refute them). According to Matthew Kapstein, medieval Buddhist philosophers deployed a host of arguments, including the argument from evil and others that "stressed formal problems in the conception of a supreme deity". Kapstein outlines this second line of argumentation as follows:

God, the theists affirm, must be eternal, and an eternal entity must be supposed to be altogether free from corruption and change. That same eternal being is held to be the creator, that is, the causal basis, of this world of corruption and change. The changing state, however, of a thing that is caused implies there to be change also in its causal basis, for a changeless cause cannot explain alteration in the result. The hypothesis of a creator god, therefore, either fails to explain our changing world, or else God himself must be subject to change and corruption, and hence cannot be eternal. Creation, in other words, entails the impermanence of the creator. Theism, the Buddhist philosophers concluded, could not as a system of thought be saved from such contradictions.

Kapstein also notes that by this time, "Buddhism's earlier refusal of theism had indeed given way to a well-formed antitheism." However, Kapstein notes that these criticisms remained mostly philosophical, since Buddhist antitheism "was conceived primarily in terms of the logical requirements of Buddhist philosophical systems, for which the concept of a personal god violated the rational demands of an impersonal, moral and causal order".

=== Madhyamaka philosophers ===
In the Twelve Gate Treatise (十二門論, Shih-erh-men-lun), the Buddhist philosopher Nagarjuna (c. 1st–2nd century) works to refute the belief of certain Indian non-Buddhists in a god called Isvara, who is "the creator, ruler and destroyer of the world". Nagarjuna makes several arguments against a creator God, including the following:

- "If all living beings are the sons of God, He should use happiness to cover suffering and should not give them suffering. And those who worship Him should not have suffering but should enjoy happiness. But this is not true in reality."
- "If God is self-existent, He should need nothing. If He needs something, He should not be called self-existent. If He does not need anything, why did He [cause] change, like a small boy who plays a game, to make all creatures?"
- "Again, if God created all living beings, who created Him? That God created Himself, cannot be true, for nothing can create itself. If He were created by another creator, He would not be self-existent."
- "Again, if all living beings come from God, they should respect and love Him just as sons love their father. But actually this is not the case; some hate God and some love Him."
- "Again, if God is the maker [of all things], why did He not create men all happy or all unhappy? Why did He make some happy and others unhappy? We would know that He acts out of hate and love, and hence is not self-existent. Since He is not self-existent, all things are not made by Him."

In his Hymn to the Inconceivable (Acintyastava), Nagarjuna attacks this belief in two verses:

33. Just as the work of a magician is empty of substance, all the rest of the world has been said by you to be empty of substance—including a creator deity. 34. If the creator is created by another, he cannot avoid being created and, consequently, is not permanent. Alternatively, if he creates himself, it implies that the creator is the agent of the activity affecting himself, which is absurd.

Nagarjuna also argues against a Creator in his Bodhicittavivaraṇa. Furthermore, in his Letter to a Friend, he also rejects the idea of a creator deity:

The aggregates (come) not from a triumph of wishing, not from (permanent) time, not from primal matter, not from an essential nature, not from the Powerful Creator Ishvara, and not from having no cause. Know that they arise from unawareness, karmic actions, and craving.

Bhāviveka (c. 500 – c. 578) also critiques the idea in his Madhyamakahṛdaya (Heart of the Middle Way, ch. III).

A later Madhyamaka philosopher, Candrakīrti, states in his Introduction to the Middle Way (6.114): "Because things (bhava) are not produced without a cause (hetu), from a creator god (isvara), from themselves, another or both, they are always produced in dependence [on conditions]."

Shantideva (c. 8th century), in the 9th chapter of his Bodhicaryāvatāra, states:

'God is the cause of the world.' Tell me, who is God? The elements? Then why all the trouble about a mere word? (119) Besides, the elements are manifold, impermanent, without intelligence or activity; without anything divine or venerable; impure. Also such elements as earth, etc., are not God.(120) Neither is space God; space lacks activity, nor is atman—that we have already excluded. Would you say that God is too great to conceive? An unthinkable creator is likewise unthinkable, so that nothing further can be said.

=== Vasubandhu ===
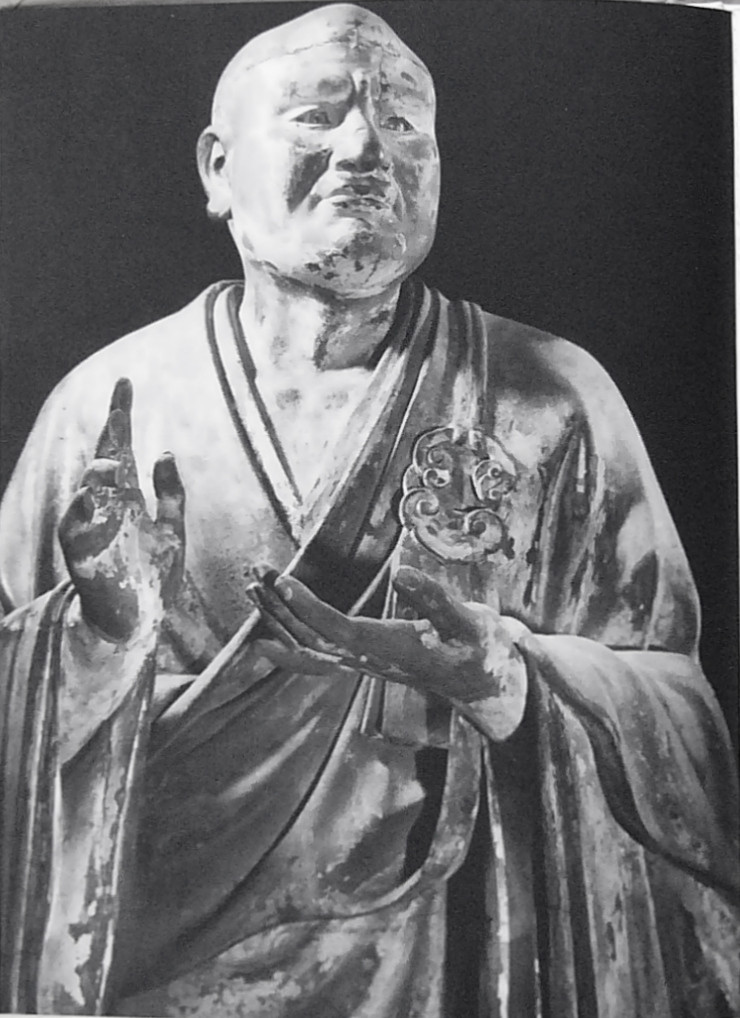
Vasubandhu: Wood, 186 cm height, about 1208, Kofukuji Temple, Nara, Japan

The 5th-century Buddhist philosopher Vasubandhu argued that a creator's singular identity is incompatible with creating the world in his Abhidharmakosha. He states (AKB, chapter 2):

The universe does not originate from one single cause (ekaṃ kāraṇam) which may be called God/Supreme Lord (Īśvara), Self (Puruṣa), Primal Source (Pradhāna) or any other name.

Vasubandhu then proceeds to outline various arguments for and against the existence of a creator deity or single cause. In the argument that follows, the Buddhist non-theist begins by stating that if the universe arose from a single cause, "things would arise all at the same time: but everyone sees that they arise successively". The theist responds that things arise in succession because of the power of God's wishes; he thus wills things to arise in succession. The Buddhist responds: "then things do not arise from a single cause, because the desires (of God) are multiple". Furthermore, these desires would have to be simultaneous, but since God is not multiple, things would all arise at the same time.

The theist now responds that God's desires are not simultaneous, "because God, in order to produce his desires, takes into account other causes". The Buddhist replies that if this is the case, then God is not the single cause of everything, and furthermore, he then relies on causes that are also dependent on other causes (and so on).

Then the question of why God creates the world is taken up. The theist states that it is for God's own joy. The Buddhist responds that in this case, God is not lord over his own joy since he cannot create it without an external mean, and "if he is not Sovereign with respect to his own joy, how can he be Sovereign with respect to the world?" Furthermore, the Buddhist also adds:

Besides, do you say that God finds joy in seeing the creatures which he has created in the prey of all the distress of existence, including the tortures of the hells? Homage to this kind of God! The profane stanza expresses it well: "One calls him Rudra because he burns, because he is sharp, fierce, redoubtable, an eater of flesh, blood and marrow.

Furthermore, the Buddhist states that the followers of God as a single cause deny observable cause and effect. If they modify their position to accept observable causes and effects as auxiliaries to their God, "this is nothing more than a pious affirmation, because we do not see the activity of a (Divine) Cause next to the activity of the causes called secondary".

The Buddhist also argues that since God did not have a beginning, the creation of the world by God would also not have a beginning (contrary to the claims of the theists). Vasubandhu states: "the Theist might say that the work of God is the [first] creation [of the world] (ādisarga): but it would follow that creation, dependent only on God, would never have a beginning, like God himself. This is a consequence which the Theist rejects."

Vasubandhu finishes this section of his commentary by stating that sentient beings wander from birth to birth doing various actions, experiencing the effects of their karma and "falsely thinking that God is the cause of this effect. We must explain the truth in order to put an end to this false conception."

=== Other Yogacara philosophers ===
The Chinese monk Xuanzang (fl. c. 602–664) studied Buddhism in India during the seventh century, staying at Nalanda. There, he studied the Yogacara teachings passed down from Asanga and Vasubandhu and taught to him by the abbot Śīlabhadra. In his work Cheng Weishi Lun (Skt. Vijñāptimātratāsiddhi śāstra), Xuanzang refutes a "Great Lord" or Great Brahmā doctrine:

According to one doctrine, there is a great, self-existent deity whose substance is real and who is all-pervading, eternal, and the producer of all phenomena. This doctrine is unreasonable. If something produces something, it is not eternal, the non-eternal is not all-pervading, and what is not all-pervading is not real. If the deity's substance is all-pervading and eternal, it must contain all powers and be able to produce all dharmas everywhere, at all times, and simultaneously. If he produces dharma when a desire arises, or according to conditions, this contradicts the doctrine of a single cause. Or else, desires and conditions would arise spontaneously since the cause is eternal. Other doctrines claim that there is a great Brahma, a Time, a Space, a Starting Point, a Nature, an Ether, a Self, etc., that is eternal and really exists, is endowed with all powers, and is able to produce all dharmas. We refute all these in the same way we did the concept of the Great Lord.

The 7th-century Buddhist scholar Dharmakīrti advances a number of arguments against the existence of a creator god in his Pramāṇavārtika, following in the footsteps of Vasubandhu.

Later Mahayana scholars, such as Śāntarakṣita, Kamalaśīla, Śaṅkaranandana (fl. c. 9th or 10th century), and Jñānaśrīmitra (fl. 975–1025), also continued to write and develop the Buddhist anti-theistic arguments.

The 11th-century Buddhist philosopher Ratnakīrti, at the former university at Vikramashila (now Bhagalpur, Bihar), criticized the arguments for the existence of a God-like being called Isvara that emerged in the Navya-Nyaya sub-school of Hinduism in his "Refutation of Arguments Establishing Īśvara" (Īśvara-sādhana-dūṣaṇa). These arguments are similar to those used by other sub-schools of Hinduism and Jainism that questioned the Navya-Nyaya theory of a dualistic creator.

=== Theravada Buddhists ===
The Theravada commentator Buddhaghosa also specifically denied the concept of a Creator. He wrote:

"For there is no god Brahma. The maker of the conditioned world of rebirths. Phenomena alone flow on. Conditioned by the coming together of causes." (Visuddhimagga 603).

== Mahayana and theism ==
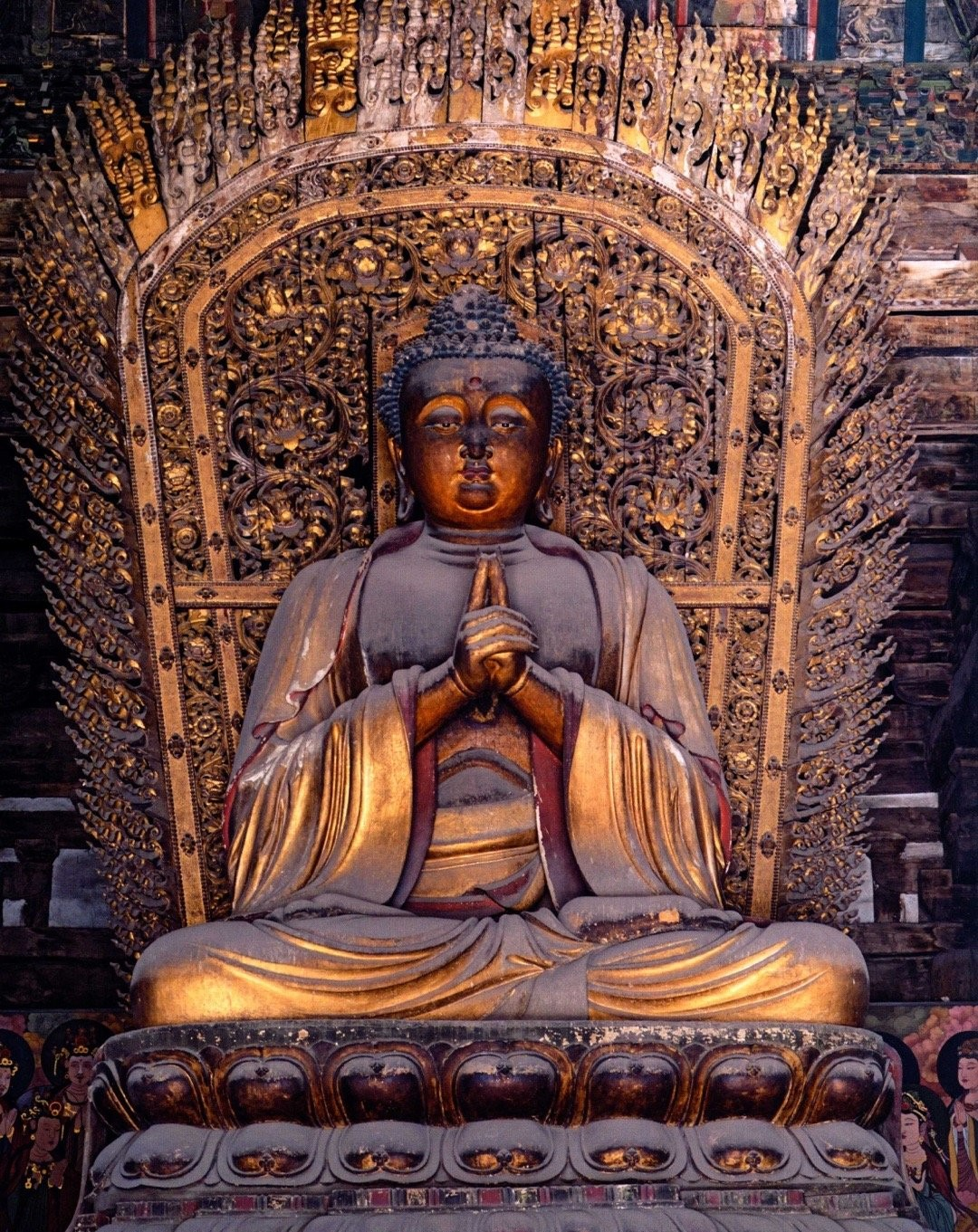
Statue of the cosmic Buddha Vairocana, Shanhua Temple, Shanxi, China

Mahayana Buddhist traditions have more complex Buddhologies, which often contain a figure variously termed the Eternal Buddha, Supreme Buddha, Original Buddha, or Adi-Buddha (primordial Buddha or first Buddha).

=== Mahayana buddhology and theism ===
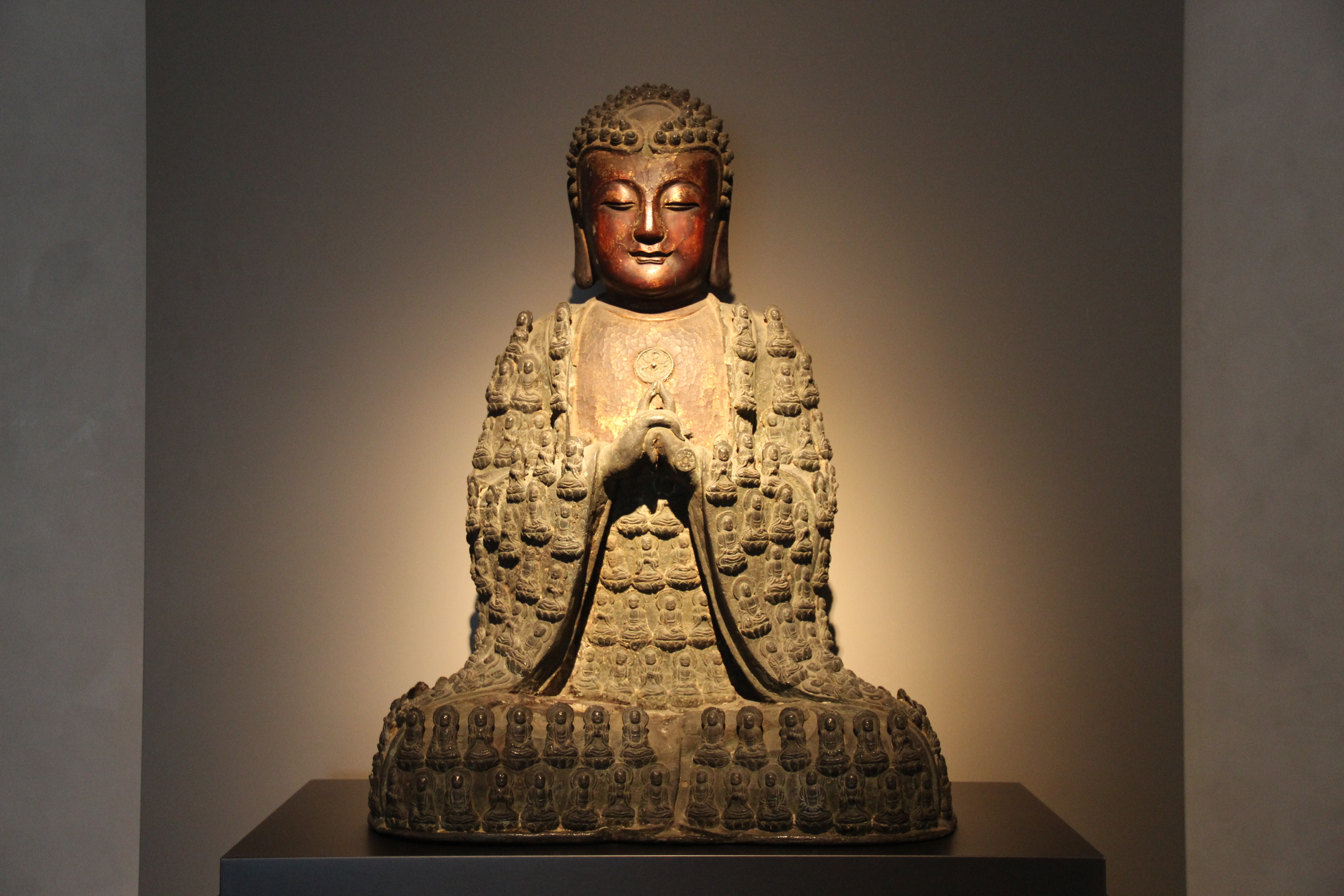
A Ming bronze of the Buddha Mahāvairocana, which depicts his body as being composed of numerous other Buddhas.

Mahayana Buddhist interpretations of the Buddha as a supreme being, which is eternal, all-compassionate, and existing on a cosmic scale, have been compared to theism by various scholars. For example, Guang Xing describes the Mahayana Buddha as an omnipotent and almighty divinity "endowed with numerous supernatural attributes and qualities". In Mahayana, a fully awakened Buddha (such as Amitābha) is held to be omniscient as well as having other qualities, such as infinite wisdom, an immeasurable life, and boundless compassion. In East Asian Buddhism, Buddhas are often seen as also having eternal life. According to Paul Williams, in Mahayana, a Buddha is often seen as "a spiritual king, relating to and caring for the world".

Various authors, such as F. Sueki, Douglas Duckworth, and Fabio Rambelli, have described Mahayana Buddhist views using the term "pantheism" (the belief that God and the universe are identical). Similarly, Geoffrey Samuel has compared Tibetan Buddhist Buddhology with the related view of panentheism.

Duckworth draws on positive Mahayana conceptions of Buddha-nature, which he explains as a "positive foundation" and "a pure essence residing in temporarily obscured sentient beings". He compares various Mahayana interpretations of Buddha-nature (Tibetan and East Asian) with a pantheist view that sees all things as divine and that "undoes the duality between the divine and the world". In a similar fashion, Eva K. Neumaier compares Mahayana Buddha-nature teachings that point to a source of all things with the theology of Nicholas of Cusa (1401–1464), who described God as an essence and the world as a manifestation of God.

José Ignacio Cabezón notes that while Mahayana sources reject a universal creator God that stands apart from the world, as well as any single creation event for the entire universe, Mahayanists do accept "localized" creation of specific worlds by the Buddhas and bodhisattvas as well as the idea that any world is jointly created by the collective karmic forces of all the beings who reside in them. Buddha-created worlds are termed "Buddha-fields" (or "pure lands"), and their creation is seen as a key activity of the Buddhas and bodhisattvas.

Much comparative work has also been done on Mahayana Buddhist thought and Whiteheadian process theology. Scholars who have worked in this include Jay B. McDaniel, John B. Cobb, Jr., David R. Griffin, Vincent Shen, John S. Yokota, Steve Odin, and Linyin Gu. Some of these figures have also been involved in Buddhist–Christian dialogue. Cobb sees many affinities with the Buddhist ideas of emptiness and not-self and Whitehead's view of God. He has incorporated these into his own process theology. In a similar fashion, some Buddhist thinkers, like Dennis Hirota and John S. Yokota, have developed Buddhist theologies that draw on process theology.

=== East Asian Buddhism and theism ===
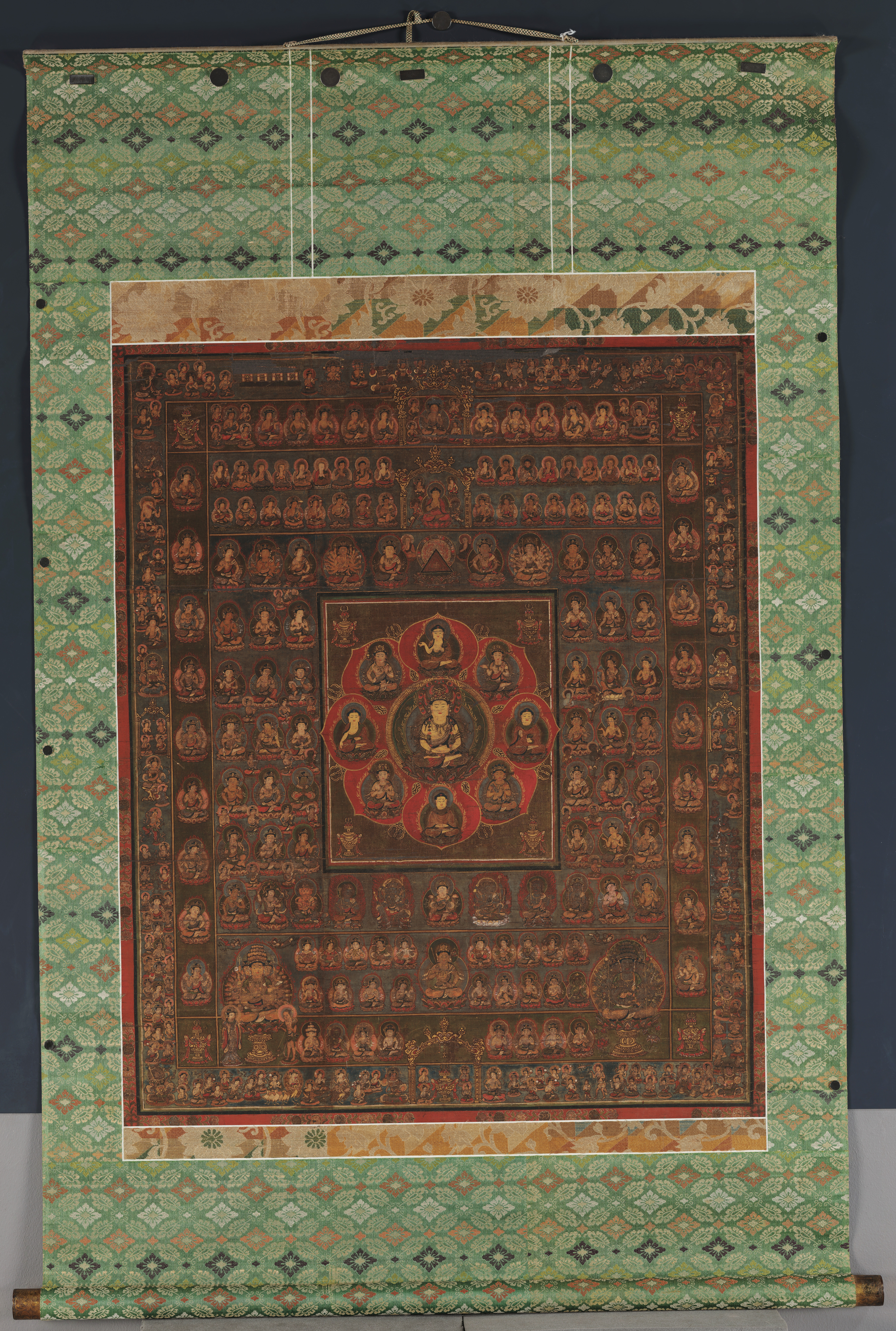
Womb World Mandala (Kongōkai Taizōkai mandara) with Mahāvairocana Buddha at the center, hanging scroll, Japan, 15th century.

In Huayan Buddhism, the supreme Buddha Vairocana is seen as the "cosmic Buddha", with an infinite body that comprises the entire universe and whose light penetrates every particle in the cosmos. According to a religious pamphlet from Tōdai-ji temple in Japan (the headquarters of Japanese Huayan), "Vairocana Buddha exists everywhere and every time in the Universe, and the Universe itself is his body. At the same time, the songs of birds, the colors of flowers, the currents of streams, the figures of clouds—all these are the sermon of Buddha". However, Francis Cook argues that Vairocana is not a god, nor has the functions of a monotheistic god, since he is not a creator of the universe, nor a judge or father who governs the world.

Thích Nhất Hạnh, meanwhile, has written that the idea of the Buddha's "cosmic body", who is both the cosmos and its creator, "is very close to the idea of God in the theistic religions". Similarly, Lin Weiyu writes that the Huayan school interprets Vairocana as "omnipresent, omnipotent and identical to the universe itself". According to Lin, the Huayan commentator Fazang's conception of Vairocana contains "elements that approach Vairocana to the monotheistic God". However, Lin also notes that this Buddha is contained within a broader Buddhist metaphysics of emptiness, which tempers the reification of this Buddha as a monotheistic creator god.

The Shingon Buddhist view of the Supreme Buddha Mahāvairocana, whose body is seen as being the whole universe, has also been called "cosmotheism" (the idea that the cosmos is God) by scholars like Charles Eliot, Hajime Nakamura, and Masaharu Anesaki. Fabio Rambelli terms it a kind of pantheism, the main doctrine of which is that Mahāvairocana's Dharma body is co-substantial with the universe and is the very substance that the universe consists of. Furthermore, this cosmic Buddha is seen as making use of all the sounds, thoughts, and forms in the universe to preach the Buddha's teaching to others. Thus, all forms, thoughts, and sounds in the universe are seen as manifestations and teachings of the Buddha.

=== Tantric Adi-Buddha theory and theism ===
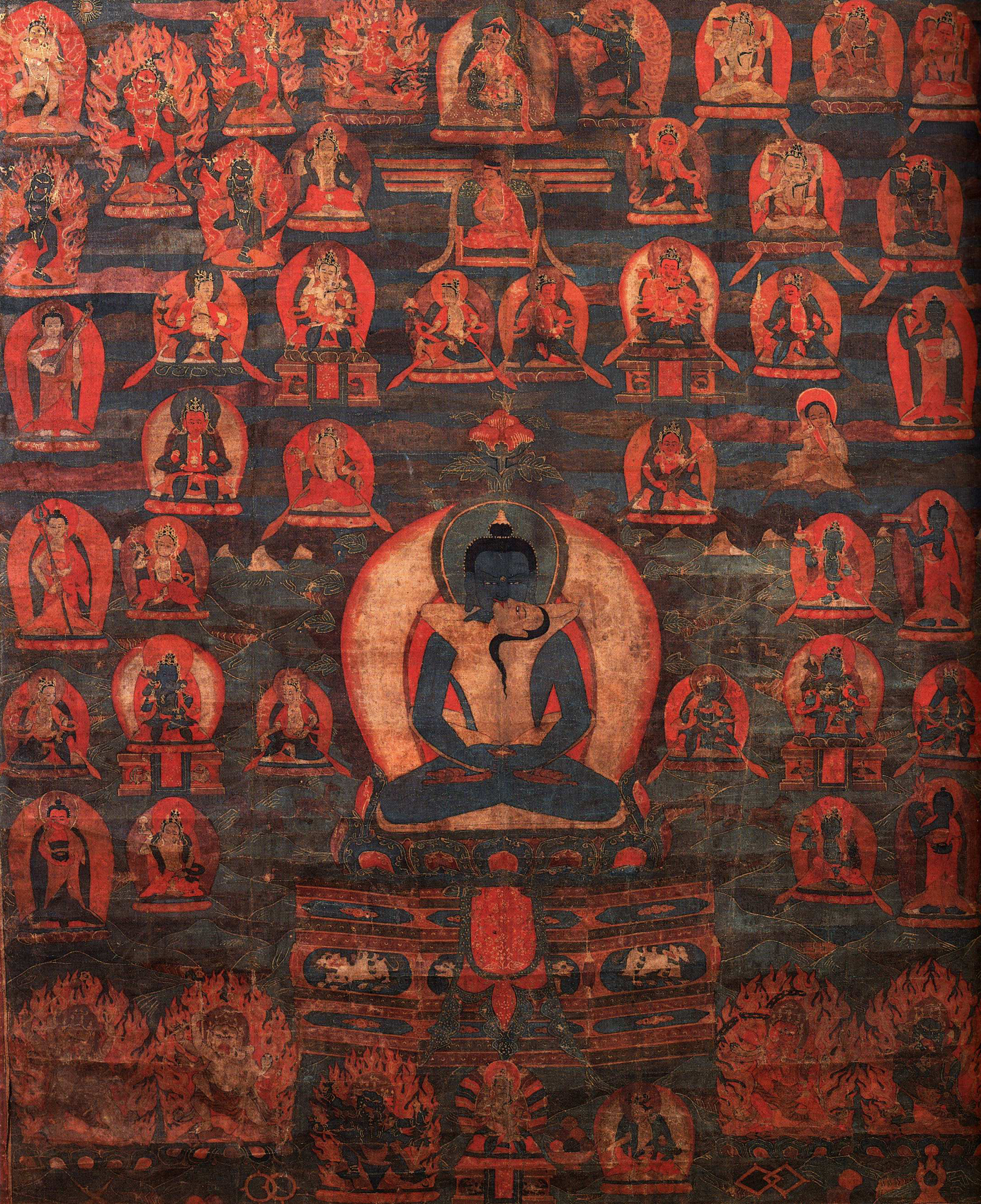
Adi-Buddha Samantabhadra, a symbol of the ground in Dzogchen thought

B. Alan Wallace writes on how the Tibetan Buddhist Vajrayana concept of the primordial Buddha (Adi-Buddha) is sometimes seen as forming the foundation of both saṃsāra (the world of suffering) and nirvana (liberation). This view, according to Wallace, holds that "the entire universe consists of nothing other than displays of this infinite, radiant, empty awareness."

Furthermore, Wallace notes similarities between these Vajrayana doctrines and notions of a divine creative "ground of being". He writes: "a careful analysis of Vajrayana Buddhist cosmogony, specifically as presented in the Atiyoga (Dzogchen) tradition of Indo-Tibetan Buddhism, which presents itself as the culmination of all Buddhist teachings, reveals a theory of a transcendent ground of being and a process of creation that bear remarkable similarities with views presented in Vedanta and Neoplatonic Western Christian theories of creation." He further comments that the three views "have so much in common that they could almost be regarded as varying interpretations of a single theory".

Douglas Duckworth sees Tibetan tantric Buddhism as "pantheist to the core", since "in its most profound expressions (e.g., highest Yoga tantra), all dualities between the divine and the world are radically undone". According to Duckworth, in Vajrayana, "the divine is seen within the world, and the infinite within the finite."

Eva K. Neumaier-Dargyay notes that the Dzogchen tantra called the Kunjed Gyalpo ("all-creating king") uses symbolic language for the Adi-Buddha Samantabhadra, which is reminiscent of theism. Neumaier-Dargyay considers the Kunjed Gyalpo to contain theistic-sounding language, such as positing a single "cause of all that exists" (including all Buddhas). However, she also writes that this language is symbolic and points to an impersonal "ground of all existence", or primordial basis, which is "the mind of perfect purity" that underlies all that exists.

Alexander Studholme also points to how the Kāraṇḍavyūhasūtra presents the great bodhisattva Avalokiteśvara as a kind of supreme lord of the cosmos and as the progenitor of various heavenly bodies and divinities (such as the Sun and Moon, the deities Shiva and Vishnu, etc.) Avalokiteśvara himself is seen, in the versified version of the sutra, to be an emanation of the first Buddha, the Adi-Buddha, who is called svayambhu (self-existent, not born from anything or anyone) and the "primordial lord" (Adinatha).

==== Adi-Buddha as non-theistic ====
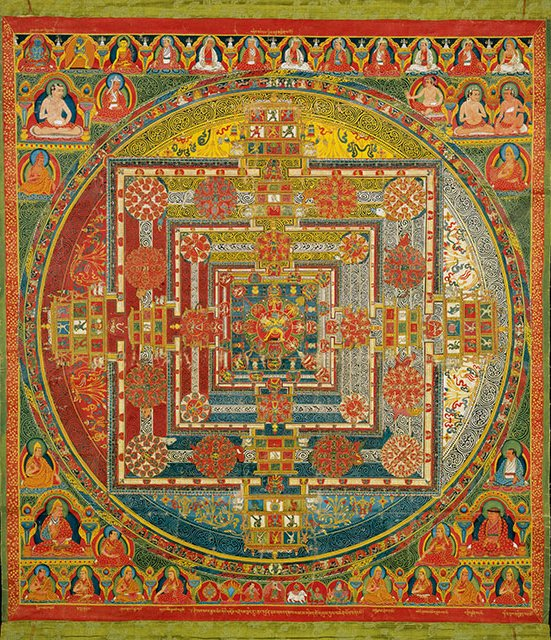
A Kalachakra mandala, which symbolically depicts the entire universe as a divine field of Buddha activity.

The 14th Dalai Lama sees this deity (called Samantabhadra) as a symbol for ultimate reality, "the realm of the Dharmakaya – the space of emptiness". He is also quite clear that "the theory that God is the creator, is almighty, and permanent is in contradiction to Buddhist teachings... For Buddhists the universe has no first cause, and hence no creator, nor can there be such a thing as a permanent, primordially pure being."

Further discussing the doctrine of the Adi-Buddha, the Dalai Lama writes that the tantric Buddhist tradition explains ultimate reality in terms of "inherent clear light, the essential nature of the mind" and that this seems to imply "that all phenomena, samsara and nirvana, arise from this clear and luminous source". This doctrine of an "ultimate source", says the Dalai Lama, seems "close to the notion of a Creator, since all phenomena, whether they belong to samsara or nirvana, originate therein". However, he warns that we not think of this as a Creator God, since the clear light is not "a sort of collective clear light, analogous to the non-Buddhist concept of Brahman as a substratum. We must not be inclined to deify this luminous space. We must understand that when we speak of ultimate or inherent clear light, we are speaking on an individual level. When, in the tantric context, we say that all worlds appear out of clear light, we do not visualize this source as a unique entity, but as the ultimate clear light of each being... It would be a grave error to conceive of it as an independent and autonomous existence from beginningless time."

The Dzogchen master Namkhai Norbu also argued that this figure is not a Creator God but is a symbol for a state of consciousness and a personification of the ground or basis (ghzi) in Dzogchen thought. Norbu explains that the Dzogchen idea of the Adi-Buddha Samantabhadra "should be mainly understood as a metaphor to enable us to discover our real condition". He further adds that:

If we deem Samantabhadra an individual being, we are far from the true meaning. In reality, he denotes our potentiality that, even though at the present moment we are in samsara, has never been conditioned by dualism. From the beginning, the state of the individual has been pure and always remains pure: this is what Samantabhadra represents. But when we fall into conditioning, it is as if we are no longer Samantabhadra because we are ignorant of our true nature. So what is called the primordial Buddha, or Adibuddha, is only a metaphor for our true condition.

Regarding the term Adi-Buddha as used in the tantric Kalachakra tradition, Vesna Wallace notes:

when the Kalacakra tradition speaks of the Adibuddha in the sense of a beginningless and endless Buddha, it is referring to the innate gnosis that pervades the minds of all sentient beings and stands as the basis of both samsara and nirvana. Whereas, when it speaks of the Adibuddha as the one who first attained perfect enlightenment by means of imperishable bliss, and when it asserts the necessity of acquiring merit and knowledge in order to attain perfect Buddhahood, it is referring to the actual realization of one's own innate gnosis. Thus, one could say that in the Kalacakra tradition, Adibuddha refers to the ultimate nature of one's own mind and to the one who has realized the innate nature of one's own mind by means of purificatory practices.

Jim Valby notes that the "All-Creating King" (Kunjed Gyalpo, i.e., the primordial Buddha) of Dzogchen thought and its companion deities "are not gods, but are symbols for different aspects of our primordial enlightenment. Kunjed Gyalpo is our timeless Pure Perfect Presence beyond cause and effect. Sattvavajra is our ordinary, analytical, judgmental presence inside time that depends upon cause and effect."

== Modern Buddhist anti-theism ==
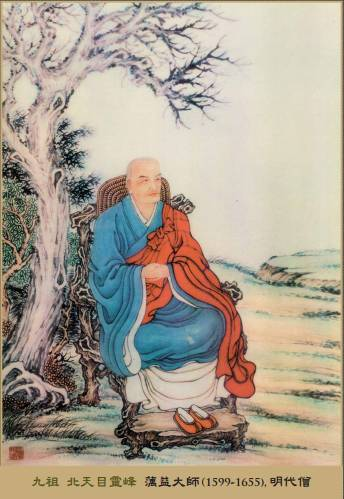
Ouyi Zhixu, a Chinese Buddhist figure of the Ming dynasty

The modern era brought Buddhists into contact with the Abrahamic religions, especially Christianity. Attempts to convert Buddhist nations to Christianity through missionary work were countered by Buddhist attempts at refutations of Christian doctrine and led to the development of Buddhist Modernism. The earliest Christian attempts to refute Buddhism and criticize its teachings were those of Jesuits like Alessandro Valignano, Michele Ruggieri, and Matteo Ricci.

These attacks were answered by Asian Buddhists, who wrote critiques of Christianity, often centered on refuting Christian theism. Perhaps the earliest such attempt was that of the Chinese monk Zhu Hong (祩宏, 1535–1615), who authored Four Essays on Heaven (天說四端). Another influential Chinese Buddhist critic of Christian theism was Xu Dashou (許大受), who wrote a long and systematic refutation of Christianity, titled Zuopi (佐闢, "help to the refutation"), which attempts to refute Christianity from the point of view of three Chinese traditions (Confucianism, Buddhism, and Taoism).

The monk Ouyi Zhixu (蕅益智旭, 1599–1655) later wrote the Bixie ji ("Collected Essays Refuting Heterodoxy"), which specifically attacks Christianity on the grounds of theodicy as well as relying on classical Confucian ethics. According to Beverley Foulks, in his essays, Zhixu "objects to the way Jesuits invest God with qualities of love, hatred, and the power to punish. He criticizes the notion that God would create humans to be both good and evil, and finally he questions why God would allow Lucifer to tempt humans towards evil."

Modern Japanese Buddhists also wrote their own works to refute Christian theism. Fukansai Habian (1565–1621) is perhaps one of the best-known of these critics, especially because he was a convert to Christianity who then became an apostate and wrote an anti-Christian polemic, titled Deus Destroyed (Ha Daiusu), in 1620. The Zen monk Sessō Sōsai also wrote an important anti-Christian work, the Argument for the Extinction of Heresy (Taiji Jashū Ron), in which he argued that the Christian God is just the Vedic Brahma and that Christianity was a heretical form of Buddhism. His critiques were particularly influential on the leadership of the Tokugawa shogunate.

Later Japanese Buddhists continued to write anti-theist critiques, focusing on Christianity. These figures include Kiyū Dōjin (a.k.a. Ugai Tetsujō 1814–91, who was a head of Jōdo-shū), who wrote Laughing at Christianity (1869), and Inoue Enryō. According to Kiri Paramore, the 19th-century Japanese attacks on Christianity tended to rely on more rationalistic and philosophical critiques than the Tokugawa-era critiques (which tended to be more driven by nationalism and xenophobia).

Modern Theravada Buddhists have also written various critiques of a Creator God, which reference Christian and modern theories of God. These works include A.L. De Silva's Beyond Belief, Nyanaponika Thera's Buddhism and the God Idea (1985), and Gunapala Dharmasiri's A Buddhist critique of the Christian concept of God (1988).

== See also ==
- Amitābha
- Buddhist views on evolution
- Deva
- Dīgha Nikāya
- Jainism and non-creationism
- Nondualism in Buddhism
- Nontheistic religions
- Polytheism in Buddhism
- Sanghyang Adi Buddha
- Transtheism

== Bibliography ==
- Harvey, Peter (2013), An Introduction to Buddhism: Teachings, History and Practices (2nd ed.), Cambridge, UK: Cambridge University Press, ISBN 978-0-521-67674-8
- Taliaferro, Charles, ed. (2013), The Routledge Companion to Theism, New York: Routledge, ISBN 978-0-415-88164-7
- de La Vallee Poussin, Louis (fr. trans.); Sangpo, Gelong Lodro (eng. trans.) (2012) Abhidharmakośa-Bhāṣya of Vasubandhu Volume I. Motilal Banarsidass Pubs. ISBN 978-81-208-3608-2
- Norbu, Namkhai; Clemente, Adriano (1999). The Supreme Source: The Kunjed Gyalpo, the Fundamental Tantra of Dzogchen Semde. Snow Lion Publications.
- Schmidt-Leukel, Perry (Editor) (2006). Buddhism, Christianity and the question of creation, karmic or divine. Ashgate Publishing Limited.
