= Mahāpratisarā =

Bodhisattva

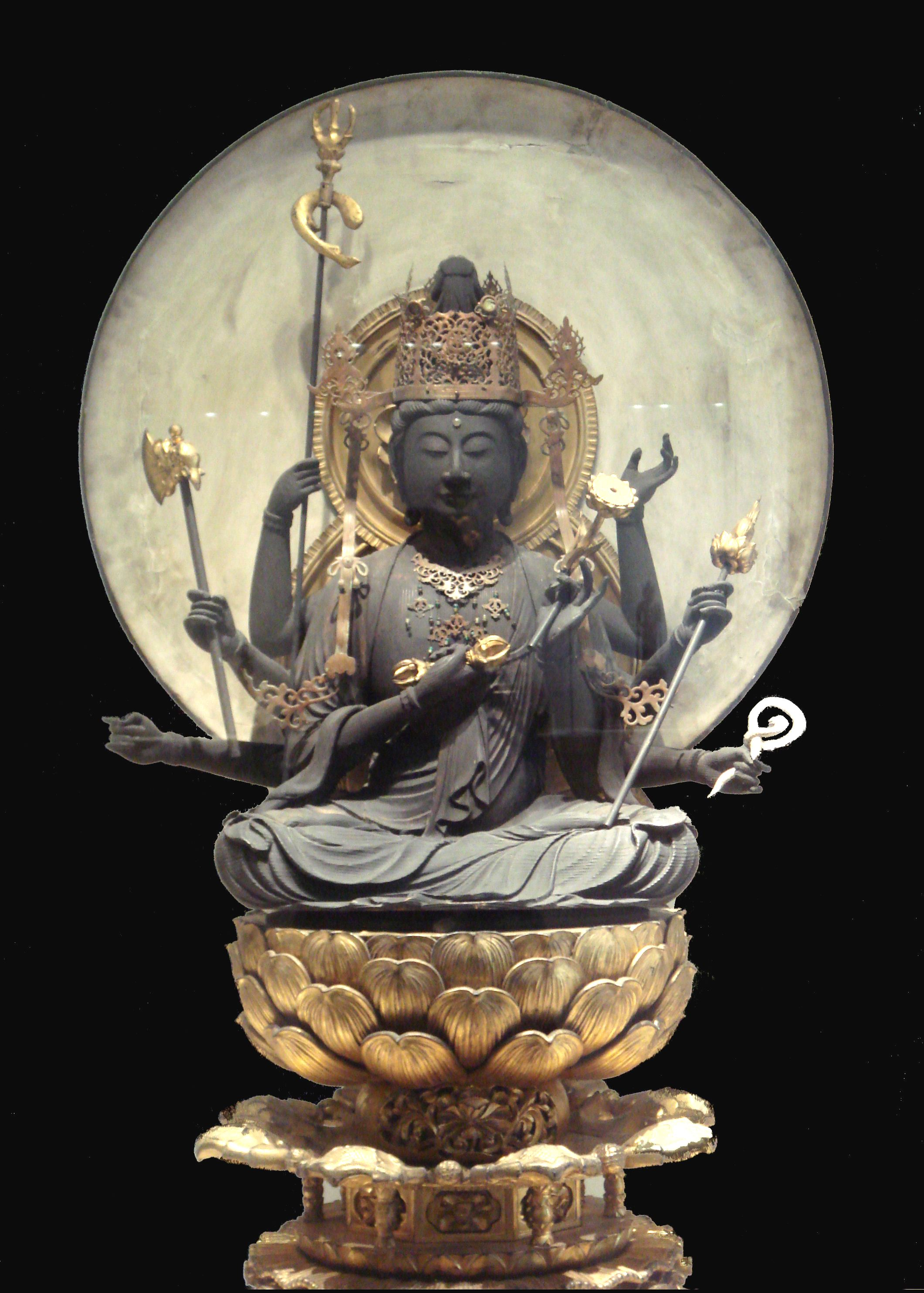
- Sanskrit: महाप्रतिसरा Mahāpratisarā महाप्रतिसरा विद्याराज्ञी Mahāpratisarā Vidyārājñī
- Chinese: 大随求菩薩 (Pinyin: Dàsuíqiú Púsà) 大隨求明王 (Pinyin: Dàsuíqiú Míngwáng)
- Japanese: 大随求菩薩(だいずいくぼさつ) (romaji: Daizuiku Bosatsu) 隨求大明王(ずいくだいみょうおう) (romaji: Zuiku Daimyōō)
- Korean: 대수구보살 (RR: Daesugu Bosal)
- Tibetan: སོ་སོར་འབྲང་མ་ Wylie: so sor 'brang ma THL: Sosor drangma
- Vietnamese: Đại Tùy Cầu Bồ Tát

Information
- Venerated by: Mahāyāna, Vajrayāna

Mahāpratisarā (Ch: 大随求菩薩; pinyin: Dàsuíqiú; Jp: Daizuigu) is a female Buddhist deity in East Asian Buddhism and Vajrayana Buddhism. She is sometimes presented as the consort of Vairocana or as an emanation of Ratnasambhava Buddha. Mahāpratisarā is the main deity of the fivefold Pañcarakṣā set of protector deities and thus she is often shown surrounded by the other four protector goddesses.

In the Indian Tantric Buddhist Sadhanamala, she is depicted as yellow in complexion, with three faces with three eyes each, ten arms, carrying various implements and weapons.

In East Asian Esoteric Buddhism, this deity is found in the Garbhadhatu Mandala and is associated with protection. She is invoked through her mantra which is believed to fulfill the wishes of sentient beings, especially in eliminating defilement and averting calamities. In Japan, Mahāpratisarā was popular during the Heian period. She is sometimes depicted with a yellow body and eight arms, though the iconography varies. There are various texts associated with Mahāpratisarā in the East Asian Buddhist canon, including two dharani sutras and two ritual manuals. Several Japanese Buddhist temples contain images of this deity, including Kanshin-ji, Kiyomizu-dera and Ishite-ji.
