= Pañcarakṣā =

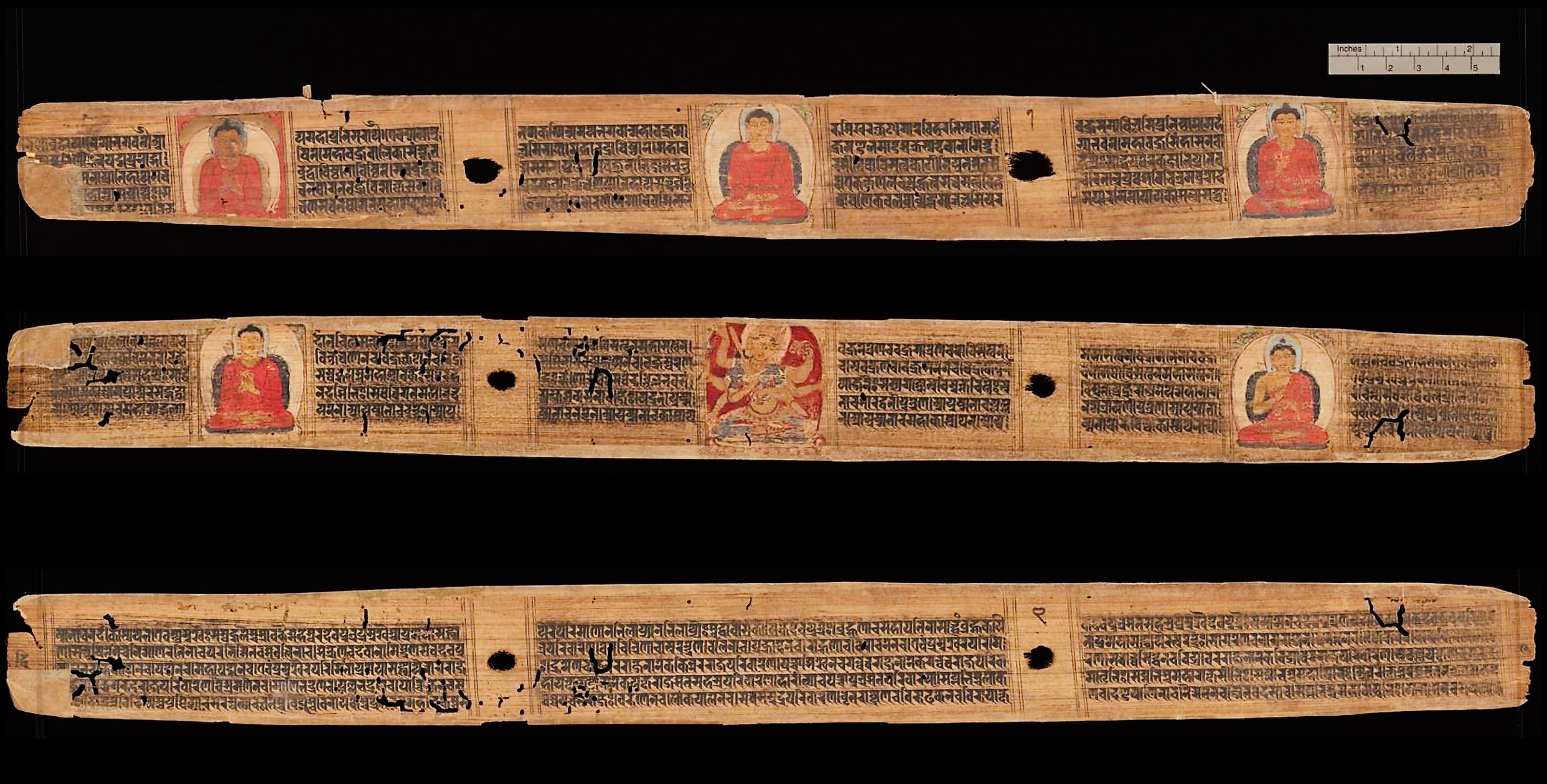
An 11th-century Buddhist Pancaraksa manuscript. It is a text on spells, prayer benefits, and goddess-related rituals.

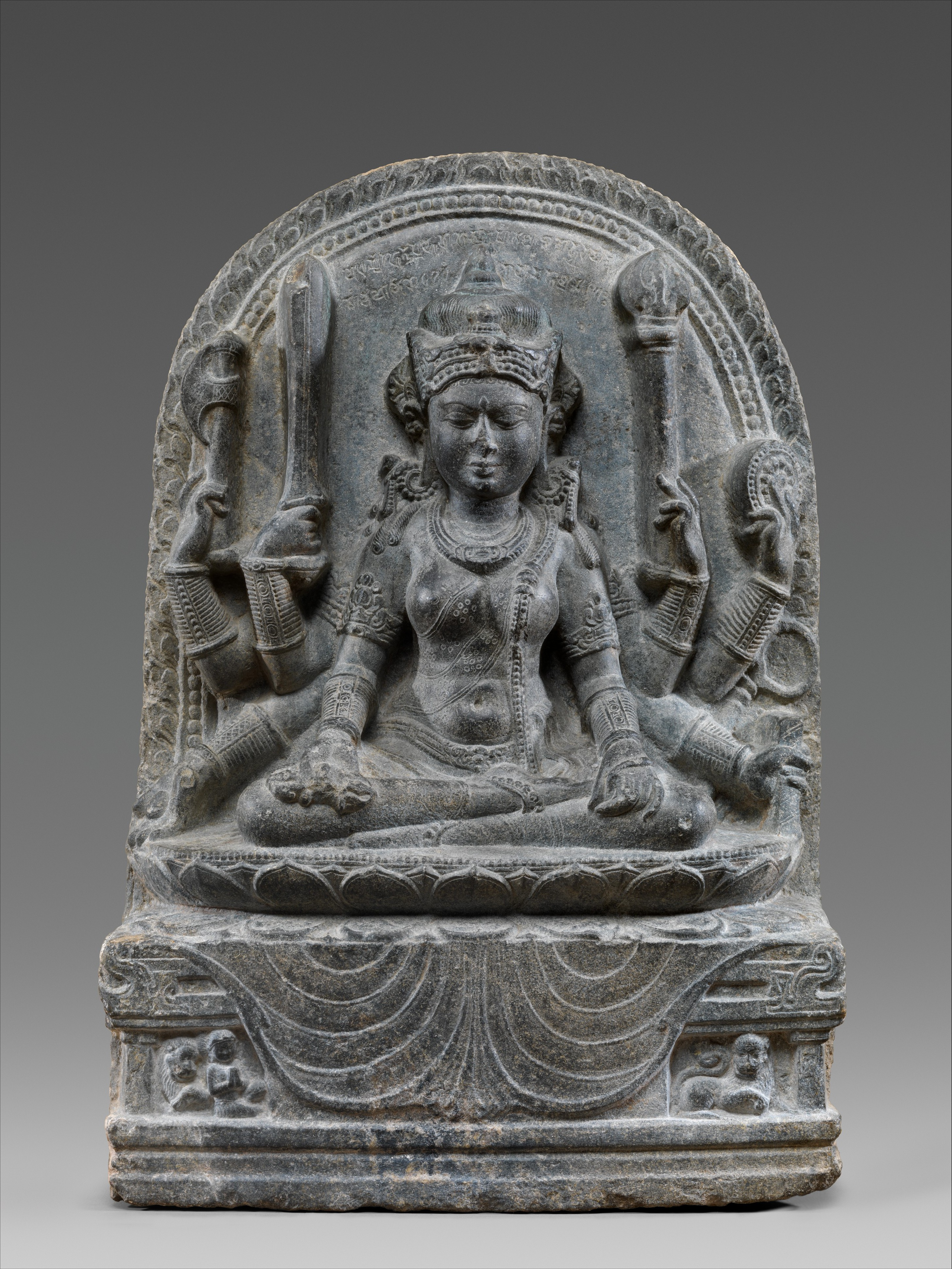
Mahāpratisarā statue, Bihar, 10th century

Pañcarakṣā means "Five Protectors". It is the title of a Buddhist text in Sanskrit, a name for a set of five dhāraṇīs as well as the name of a set of Buddhist protector goddesses identified with these incantations. It is an early work in the dhāraṇī genre of Buddhist literature, with Tibetan records mentioning it by about 800 CE. The Pañcarakṣā manuscripts survive in Tibet, Nepal and India in many divergent versions. The text includes spells, a list of benefits by its recitation, and the ritual instructions on how and when to use it. In the Buddhist tradition, each of the "Five" protections that are mentioned in the Pañcarakṣā are Buddhist deities (goddesses).

The five protective dhāraṇī-goddesses are:

- Mahāpratisarā (for protection against sin, disease and evils),
- Mahāsahasrapramardinī (for protection against evil spirits),
- Mahāmāyūrī or vidyārājñī (for protection against snake-poison),
- Mahāśītavatī (for protection against 'cruel' planets, cruel animals and poisonous insects), and
- Mahārakṣā mantrānusāriṇī (for protection against diseases).
