= Vincent Shen =

Taiwanese scholar

- 沈清松
- Born: 1949; Taiwan
- Died: November 14, 2018 (aged 69)

Education
- Education: Fu Jen Catholic University (BA, MA); University of Louvain (MA, PhD)

Philosophical work
- Era: 21st-century philosophy
- Region: Western philosophy
- School: Chinese philosophy
- Institutions: University of Toronto; National Chengchi University
- Main interests: phenomenology

Vincent Shen (Chinese: 沈清松; 1949 – November 14, 2018) was a Taiwanese philosopher known for his work in Chinese philosophy and in the comparative dialogue between Western and Chinese thought.

== Biography ==
Born in Taiwan in 1949, Shen completed his undergraduate studies at Fu Jen Catholic University and his PhD at the University of Louvain (UCLouvain) in 1980 on the philosophies of Maurice Blondel and Alfred North Whitehead, before returning to Taiwan to teach philosophy at the National Chengchi University in Taipei for twenty years. He moved to Canada in 2000, where he held the Lee Chair in Chinese Thought and Culture at the University of Toronto, a post shared across the Departments of East Asian Studies and Philosophy, until his death in 2018.

Shen died on November 14, 2018, after suffering from a major stroke. He is survived by his wife, Joanna Liu, also a professor in the Department of East Asian Studies of the University of Toronto, a son and daughter, and grandchildren.
