= Dennis Hirota =

Dennis Hirota is a professor in the Department of Shin Buddhism at Ryukoku University in Kyoto, Japan. He was born in Berkeley, California in 1946 and received his B.A. from University of California, Berkeley. In 2008, he was a visiting professor of Buddhism at Harvard Divinity School where his studies focused on the Buddhist monk Shinran.

He has worked extensively as a translator and editor of Buddhist works. He is particularly known for his translation work in The Collected Works of Shinran. He has also published numerous books and articles, in both English and Japanese, on Pure Land Buddhism and Buddhist aesthetics.

== Resources ==
- The Collected Works of Shinran
- Podcasts of a six-part lecture series on Shinran given at the Institute of Buddhist Studies at Berkeley.
- Shinran, Barth, and Religion: Engagement with Religious Language as an Issue of Comparative Theology

== Bibliography ==
- Living in Amida's Universal Vow: Essays on Shin Buddhism [contributor] (World Wisdom, 2004)
- Wind in the Pines: Classic Writings of the Way of Tea as a Buddhist Path (Asian Humanities Press, 2002) ISBN 978-0-89581-910-9
- Toward a Contemporary Understanding of Pure Land Buddhism: Creating a Shin Buddhist Theology in a Religiously Plural World (State University of New York Press, 2000) ISBN 978-0-7914-4530-3
- No Abode: The Record of Ippen (University of Hawaii Press, 1998) ISBN 978-0-8248-1997-2
- Shinran: An Introduction to His Thought (Hongwanji International Center, 1989)
- Tannisho: A Primer (Ryukoku University, 1982)
