= Fabian Fucan =

Japanese writer

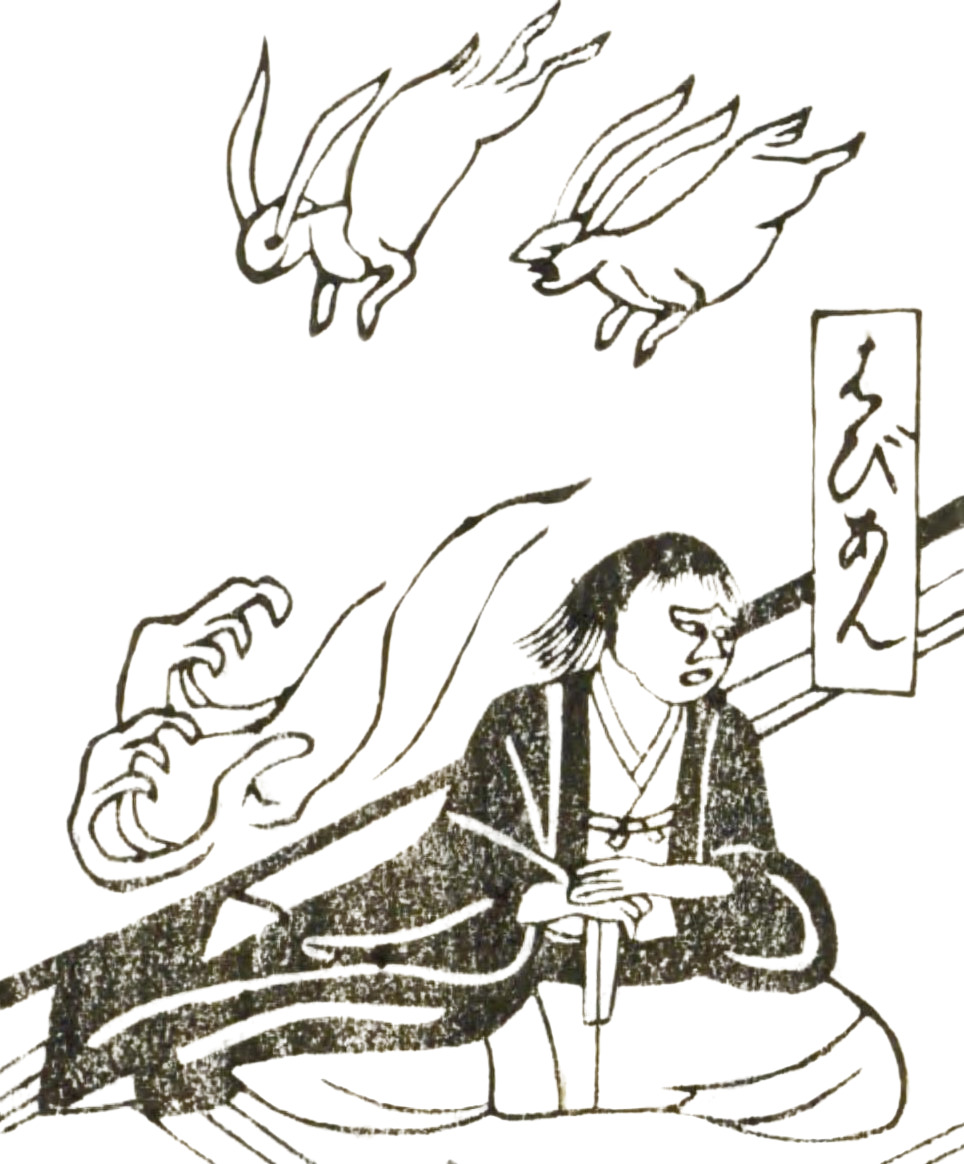
Fabian

Fabian Fucan (不干斎, Fukansai; c. 1565–1621) was a Japanese writer who, in his youth, converted from Zen Buddhism to Christianity and back. He wrote tracts at first advocating and later criticizing Christianity in comparison to the other religions of Japan.

== Early life ==
Although little is known about Fabian's life before his conversion to Christianity, he is known to have hailed from the Hokuriku region. Sometime in his youth, he would join a Zen Buddhist monastery and given the name Eshun (恵俊). Fabian would convert to Christianity in 1583.

== Christianity ==
Fabian became an Irmão (Portuguese for "brother") in the Society of Jesus in 1586. During his time with the Jesuits, he made significant contributions to the production of Christian devotionals and assisted members of the Society in their study of the Japanese language. In 1592, Fabian wrote an abridged edition of the Japanese epic The Tale of the Heike in Latin script which was used as a language and history textbook by the missionaries. He also translated portions of Aesop's Fables into Japanese.

The Myōtei Dialogues, one of Fabian's two well-known pieces of writing, was a work of Christian apologetics, framed as a dialogue between the fictional Lady Myōshu and Yūtei. In the work, Fabian critiqued Buddhism, Shinto and Confucianism. He was known as a great public debater, said to embarrass his Buddhist opponents in the many debates he partook in. However, many details regarding his membership in the Society are unknown, as there are limited writings about Fabian prior to his debate with Neo-Confucianist Hayashi Dōshun.

== Apostasy and Deus Destroyed ==
Although Fabian's debate with Dōshun, which centered around the rationalization of Christian beliefs according to early modern Japanese views of the world, ended with each side feeling more confident of his beliefs, Fabian shortly thereafter left the Society of Jesus and briefly vanished from public view around 1608. He reappeared in 1620, having renounced Christianity.

Fabian's apostasy may be attributable to his belief that the Portuguese Jesuits routinely treated their Japanese counterparts as their inferiors. In 1620, Fabian wrote Ha Daiusu, a treatise against Christianity. The work is considered one of the earliest rebuttals of Christian criticism aimed towards Japanese religions that would later be used as a model for future anti-Christian treatises. One such possible text influenced by Fabian's Ha Daiusu was a tract penned by Suzuki Shosan titled Ha Kirishitain (Christianity Destroyed). The text was used throughout the Kyushu region to help preach against and eliminate Christianity from the area, especially in the aftermath of the Shimabara Rebellion.

== Works ==
- The Myōtei Dialogues (1605)
- Ha Daiusu (1620)
