= Douglas Duckworth =

American academic (born 1971)

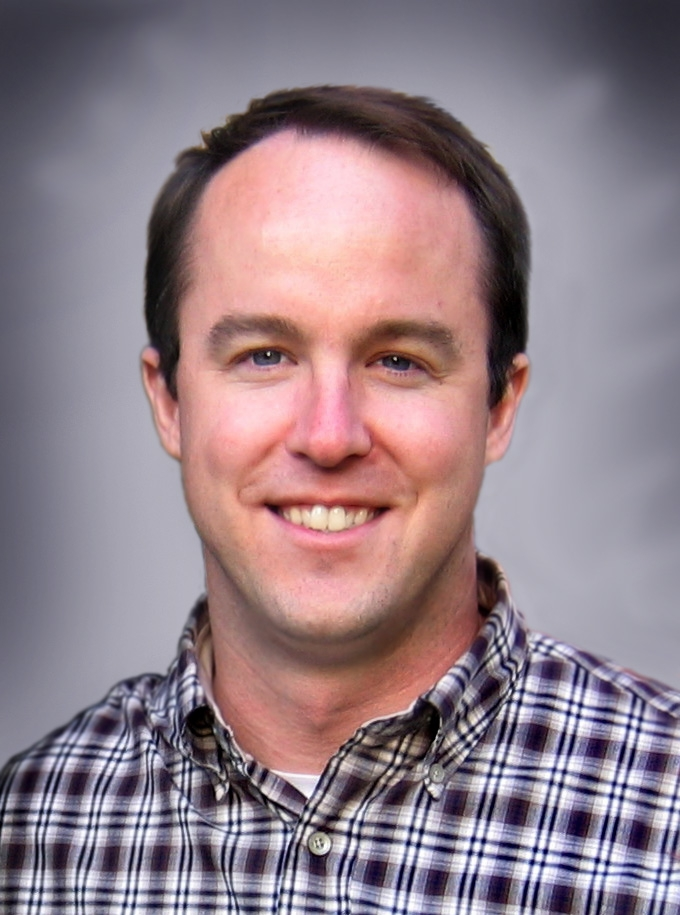
- Born: September 4, 1971 (age 55); United States

Academic background
- Education: University of Virginia

Academic work
- Discipline: Buddhist philosophy
- Institutions: Temple University

Douglas S. Duckworth (born 1971) is an American academic working in the field of Buddhist philosophy and Tibetan Buddhism. He has two daughters Dakota S. Duckworth and Maya R. Duckworth.

== Career ==
Douglas Duckworth is currently at professor at Temple University and director of graduate studies in the Department of Religion. He has previously taught at Kathmandu University.

== Publications ==
- Duckworth, Douglas (2008). Mipam on Buddha-Nature: The Ground of the Nyingma Tradition. Albany NY: State University of New York Press. ISBN 9781435663787. OCLC 246175664.
- Duckworth, Douglas (2011). Jamgön Mipam: His Life and Teachings. Boston MA: Shambhala Publications. ISBN 978-1590306697.
- Bötrül; Duckworth, Douglas (2011). Distinguishing the Views and Philosophies: Illuminating Emptiness in a Twentieth-Century Tibetan Buddhist Classic. Albany: State University of New York Press. ISBN 9781438434377. OCLC 612349326.
- Duckworth, Douglas (2014). "Non-Representational Language in Mipam's Re-presentation of Other-Emptiness".
- Gold, Jonathan C.; Duckworth, Douglas (2020). Readings of Sāntideva’s Guide to Bodhisattva Practice.
- Duckworth, Douglas (2020). The Profound Reality of Interdependence: An Overview of the Wisdom Chapter of the Way of the Bodhisattva.
- Duckworth, Douglas (2021). Tibetan Buddhist Philosophy of Mind and Nature.
