= Twenty-Four Protective Deities =

Group of deities in Chinese Buddhism

Statue of the Twenty-Four Devas (二十四諸天 Èrshísì Zhūtiān) in Lingyin Temple (靈隱寺 Língyǐnsì); Hangzhou, China
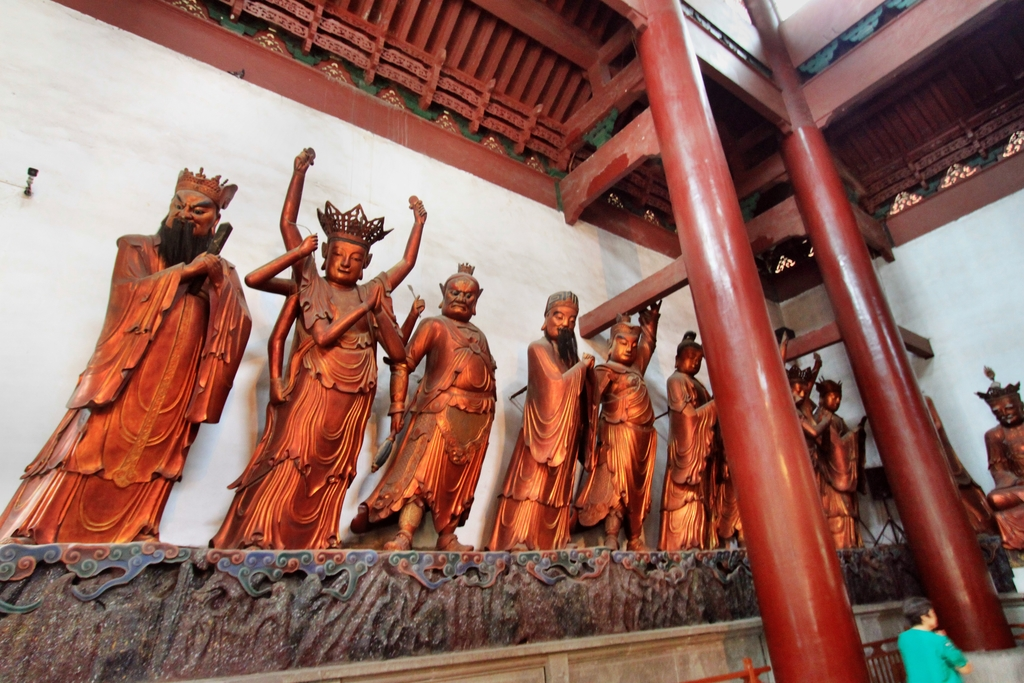
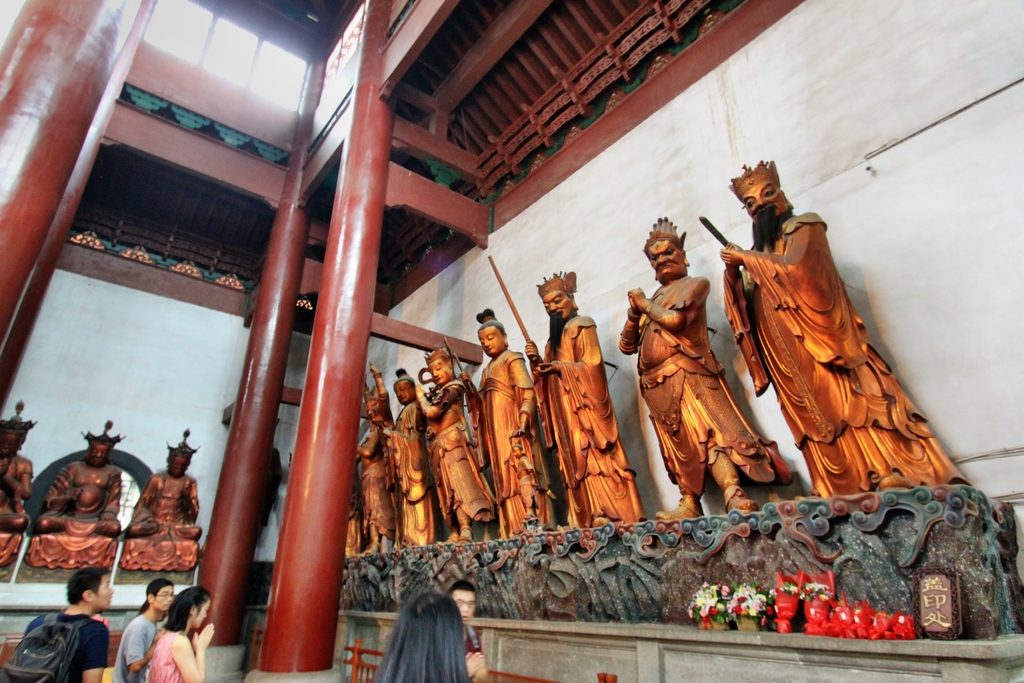

The Twenty-Four Protective Deities or the Twenty-Four Devas (Chinese: 二十四諸天; pinyin: Èrshísì Zhūtiān), sometimes reduced to the Twenty Protective Deities or the Twenty Devas (Chinese: 二十諸天; pinyin: Èrshí Zhūtiān), are a group of dharmapalas in Chinese Buddhism who are venerated as defenders of the Buddhist dharma. The group mostly consists of devas, naga kings, vajra-holders and other beings mentioned in Buddhist sūtras, as well as a few adapted from the Taoist pantheon and converted into Buddhist dharmapalas.

== Overview ==
In historical Indian Buddhism, there were originally sixteen devas who were considered as dharmapalas. These devas, such as Shiva, Indra and Brahma, are mentioned in various Mahayana Buddhist sūtras, such as the Lotus Sūtra and the Kāraṇḍavyūha Sūtra. More deities, such Surya, Chandra, Yama and Sāgara, were later added to form a group of twenty. At a later date, the Kinnara King was also added. After the transmission of Buddhism into China, the number and identity of the deities remained around until the Song (960–1279), Liao (916–1115) and Jin (1115–1234) dynasties, when several temples started to enshrine twenty-four deities. Statues of this three gods originally from the Taoist pantheon, namely the Emperor Zi Wei, Emperor Dongyue and the Thunder God, were adapted into Buddhist dharmapalas and added to the grouping as well, forming the modern list of twenty-four deities. In Japan, only one example of this grouping exists, which is enshrined in the Ōbaku Zen temple of Hōrin-ji in Shizuoka.

Veneration of the twenty-four deities has continued into modern Chinese Buddhist traditions. In Chinese Buddhist temples and monasteries, statues of the deities are typically enshrined in the Daxiong Baodian on both sides of the hall flanking the central statues. A puja called the Gongfo Zhaitian (供佛齋天) or just Zhaitian (齋天), meaning "Offering to Buddhas and Celestial Guardians", where the twenty-four deities are venerated (but refuge is not taken in them), is customarily performed in Chinese Buddhist temples on the 9th day of the 1st month of the Chinese calendar, commemorating the traditional feast day of the Jade Emperor of Taoism. This ceremony was started during the Sui dynasty by Zhiyi of the Tiantai tradition according to the rites prescribed in the Golden Light Sutra and has been carried down through tradition to the present day. During the ritual, a temporary altar to the twenty-four devas are typically erected. In some temples, the three deities originally from the Taoist pantheon as well as the Kinnara King are excluded from the list and the remaining devas are venerated as the Twenty Protective Deities (二十諸天). In addition, regional varieties of this grouping exist in different parts of China. For instant, Shanhua Temple and Tiefo Temple in Shanxi includes deities such as Agni, Varuna, Isana, Rakshasa and Shensha Dajiang in place of some of the other deities in the list.

== List of the Twenty-Four Deities ==
The list of deities consist of Maheśvara (Shiva), Brahma, Indra, Lakshmi, Saraswati, the Four Heavenly Kings, Surya, Chandra, Guhyapāda, Pañcika, Skanda, Prthivi, Spirit of the Bodhi Tree, Hārītī, Mārīcī, Sāgara, Yama, the Kinnara King, Emperor Zi Wei, Emperor Dongyue and the Thunder God (Leigong). Other regional variations include other deities like Agni, Vayu, Varuna, Isana, Luochatian and Shensha Dajiang.

=== Standard list ===
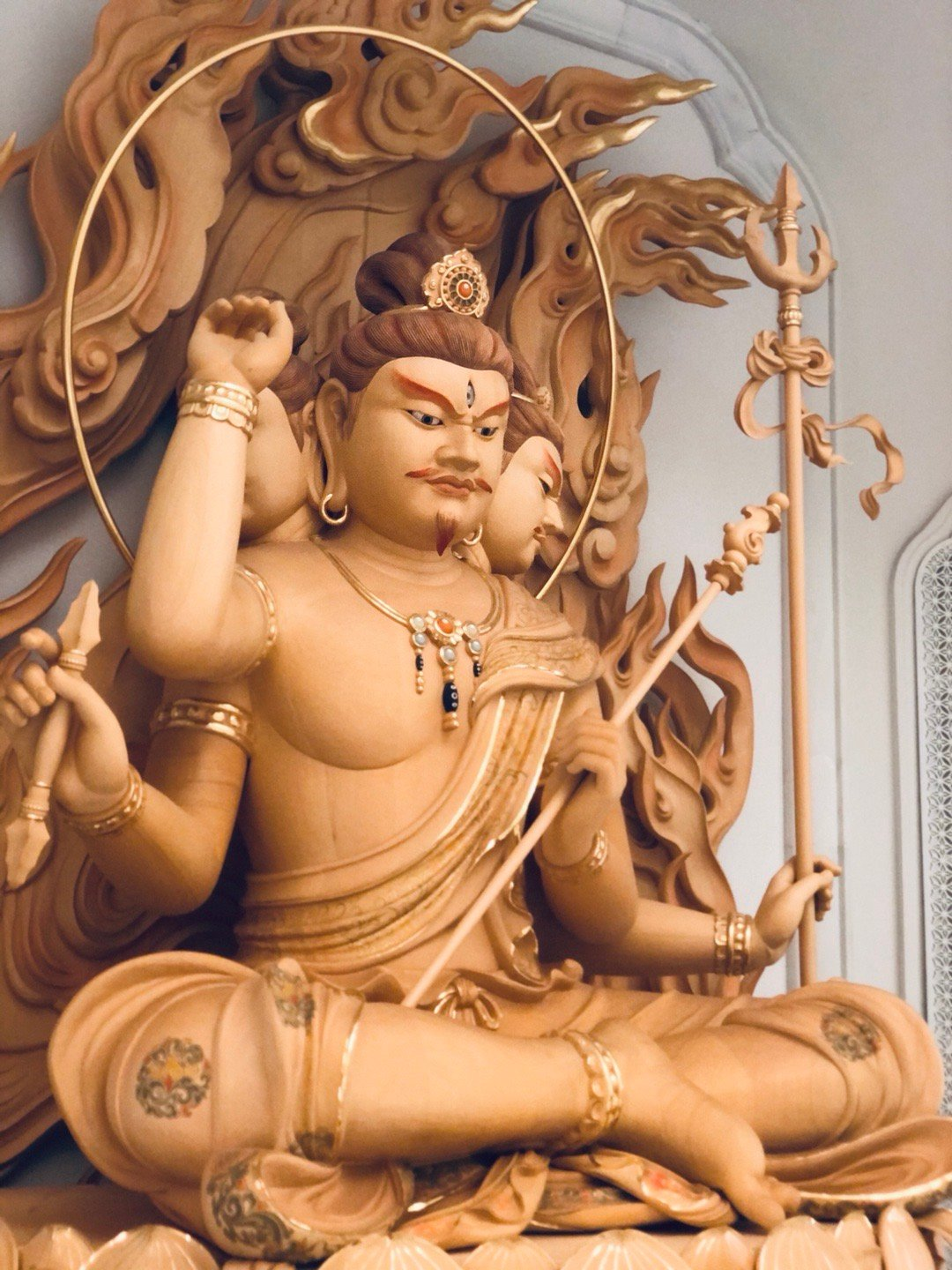
Statue of Dazizaitian at Putuoshan Guanyin Dharma Realm in Zhejiang, China

==== Dazizaitian (Maheśvara) ====
In Chinese, he is known as Dazizaitian (大自在天), meaning "Great self-existent deva", as well as Moxishouluotian (摩醯首羅天), which is a Chinese transcription of "Maheśvara" in Sanskrit. In Buddhist cosmology, he is considered the ruler of the three realms. He is described under two forms, one as the prince of demons, the other as a divine Bodhisattva. As a Piśāca, head of the demons, he is represented in Buddhist iconography with three eyes and eight arms, and riding on a white bull; a bull or a linga being his symbol. As a Śuddhāvāsa, or Pure dwelling, he is described as a bodhisattva of the tenth or highest degree, on the point of entering Buddhahood.

==== Fantian (Brahma) ====
In Chinese, he is known as Dafantian (大梵天) or Fantian (梵天), meaning "Brahma-deva", and Simianshen (四面神), meaning "Four-faced god" as depicted in the Thai tradition. While he is considered to be the creator god in Hinduism, he is not regarded as such in Buddhism, which rejects the notion of any creator deities. In Buddhist iconographic form, he is often portrayed as a man dressed in traditional Chinese Emperor robes and crown. In another iconographic form, he is portrayed as riding on a swan and as having four faces and four arms. One arm holds a lotus flower, one arm holds nianzhu (prayer beads), one arm holds a water vase and one arm forms a mudra.

==== Dishitian (Śakra) ====
In Chinese, he is known as Dishitian (帝釋天). In Buddhist cosmology, he is considered the ruler of Trāyastriṃśa and sometimes conflated with the Jade Emperor in Chinese folk religion. In Buddhist iconographic form, he is portrayed in traditional Chinese Emperor robes and crown. Behind his figure stands three female attendants, one holding an umbrella, one holding Mount Meru and one sitting within a Nelumbo nucifera.

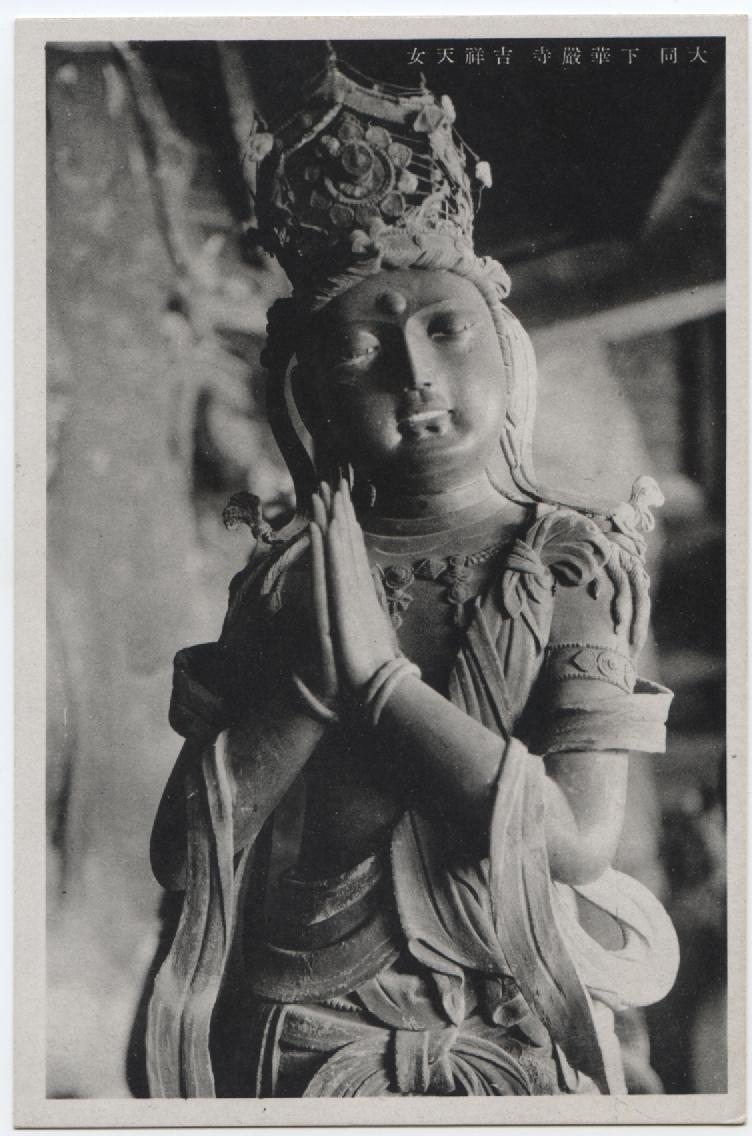
Statue of Jixiang Tiannü in Huayan Temple in Datong, Shanxi Province, China

==== Jixiang Tiannü (Lakshmi) ====
In Chinese, she is known as Jixiang Tiannü (吉祥天女), meaning "Auspicious Goddess", as well as Gongdetian (功德天), meaning "Meritous Deva". In Buddhist cosmology, she is considered the goddess of wealth. In Buddhist iconographic form, based on her description in the Golden Light Sutra, she usually holds the cintāmaṇi jewel in her left hand and forms a mudra with her right hand. She is the foremost of the twenty-four deities and is often invoked first. Her mantra, the Shrīdevī Dhāraṇī (大吉祥天女咒; Dà Jíxiáng Tiānnǚ Zhòu) is classified as one of the Ten Small Mantras (十小咒; Shí xiǎo zhòu), which are a collection of dharanis that are commonly recited in Chinese Buddhist temples in during morning liturgical services.

==== Biancaitian (Saraswati) ====
In Chinese, she is known as Biancaitian (辯才天), meaning "Eloquent Devī", and Miaoyintian (妙音天), meaning "Devī of Wonderful Sounds". In Buddhist cosmology, she is considered the goddess of knowledge and music as well as the sister of Yama. In Buddhist iconographic form, based on her description in the Golden Light Sutra, she is portrayed as having eight arms, one holding a bow, one holding arrows, one holding a knife, one holding a lance, one holding an axe, one holding a pestle, one holding an iron wheel, and one holding ropes. In another popular Buddhist iconographic form, she is portrayed as sitting down and playing a pipa, a Chinese lute-like instrument.

==== Duowen Tianwang (Vaiśravaṇa) ====
In Chinese, he is known as Duowen Tianwang (多聞天王), meaning "Heavenly King who listens to many teachings" in reference to the belief that he guards the place where the Buddha teaches and hence listens to many of the Buddhist teachings, as well as Pishamentian (毗沙門天), which is a Chinese transcription of his name in Sanskrit. He is regarded as one of the Four Heavenly Kings who guards the north. In Buddhist iconographic form, he holds a pagoda in his right hand and a trident in his left hand.

==== Zengzhang Tianwang (Virūḍhaka) ====
In Chinese, he is known as Zhengzhang Tianwang (增長天王), meaning "Heavenly King of growth" in reference to his ability to teach sentient beings to grow in compassion, as well as Biloulecha (毘楼勒叉), which is a Chinese transcription of his name in Sanskrit. He is regarded as one of the Four Heavenly Kings who guards the south. In Buddhist iconographic form, he is usually colored green or blue and brandishes a sword.

==== Chiguo Tianwang (Dhṛtarāṣṭra) ====
In Chinese, he is known as Chiguo Tianwang (持國天王), meaning "Heavenly King who holds a country" in reference to the belief that he can help support a country against enemies, as well as Titoulaizha (提頭頼吒), which is a Chinese transcription of his name in Sanskrit. He is regarded as one of the Four Heavenly Kings who guards the east. In Buddhist iconographic form, he holds a pipa.

==== Guangmu Tianwang (Virūpākṣa) ====
In Chinese, he is known as Guangmu Tianwang (廣目天王), meaning "Heavenly King with broad eyes" in reference to the belief that he is very far-sighted, as well as Biloubocha (毘楼博叉)), which is a Chinese transcription of his name in Sanskrit. He is regarded as one of the Four Heavenly Kings who guards the west. In Buddhist iconographic form, he holds a red naga or a red lasso in his hands.

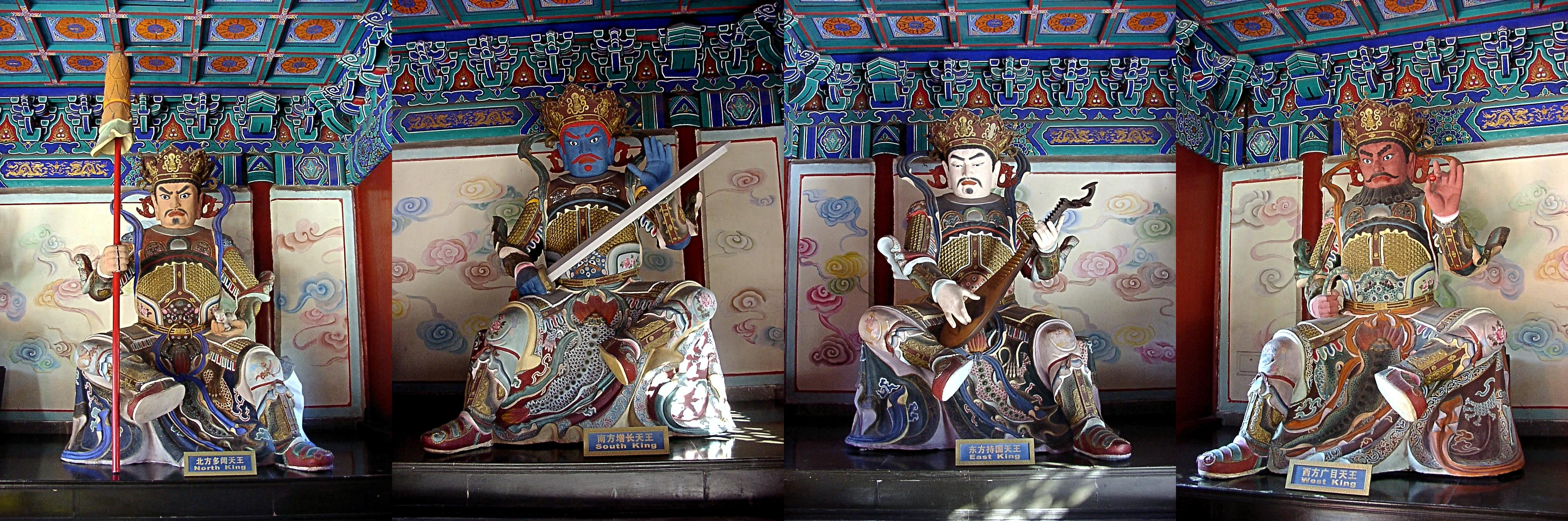
Statues of the Four Heavenly Kings. From left to right: Duowen Tianwang, ZengZhang Tianwang, Chiguo Tianwang, and Guangmu Tianwang in Beihai Park in Beijing, China.

==== Ritian (Surya) ====
In Chinese, he is known as Ritian (日天) or Rigong Tianzi (日宮天子). In Buddhist cosmology, he is considered the sun god. In Buddhist iconographic form, he holds a lotus flower in his hands. He sits in a chariot drawn by eight horses with two female attendants at his side. In another popular iconographic form, he is dressed in the robes and cap of a Chinese minister and holds the sun in his hands.

==== Yuetian (Chandra) ====
In Chinese, he is known as Yuetian (月天)) or Yuegong Tianzi (月宮天子)). In Buddhist cosmology, he is considered the moon god. In Buddhist iconographic form, he bears the full moon on his crown. On the moon, there is a jade rabbit. In another popular iconographic form, he is dressed in the robes and cap of a Chinese minister and holds the moon in his hands.

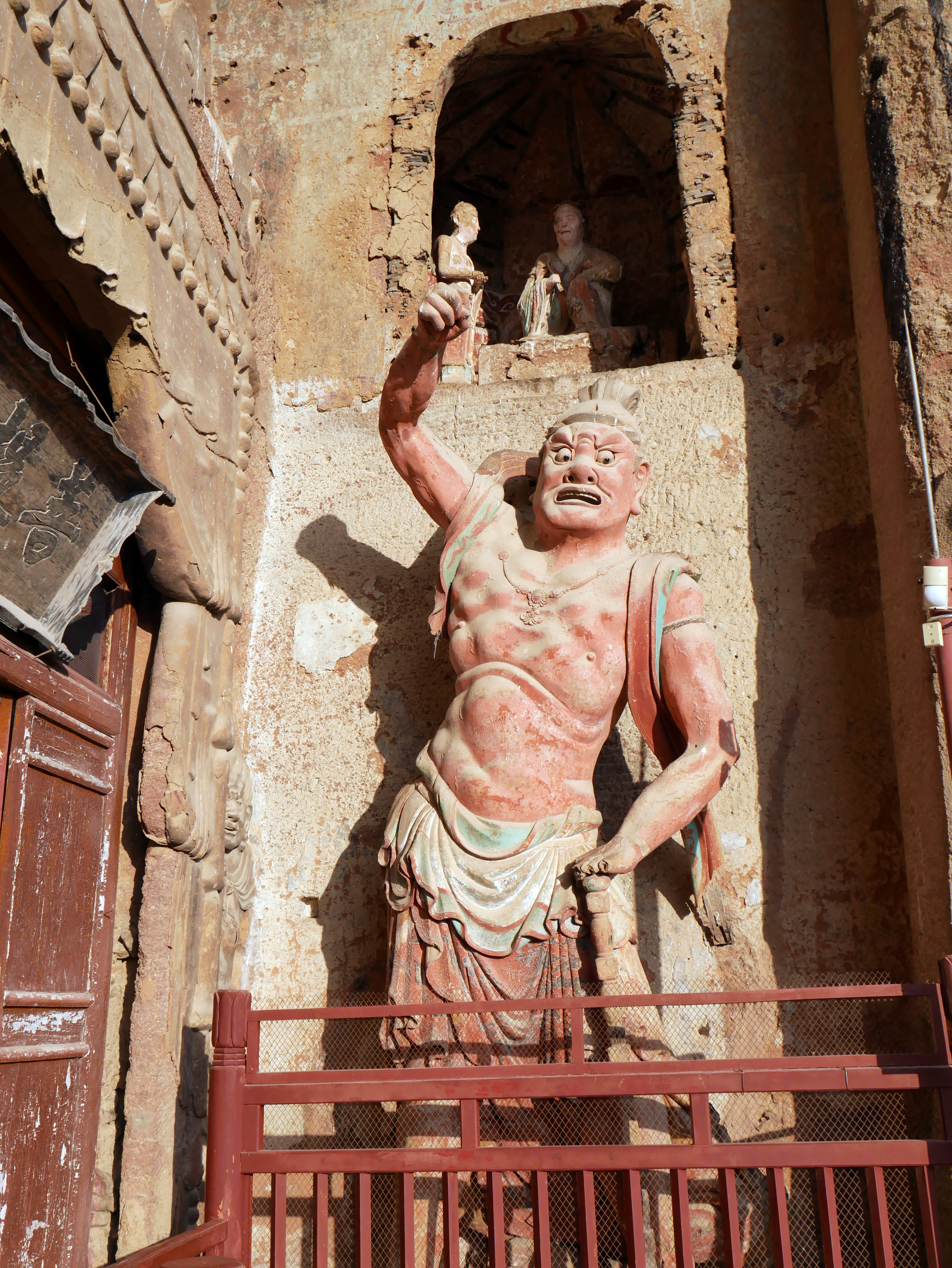
Statue of Miji Jingang, one out of several thousand statues, located at the Maijishan Grottoes, Gansu, China. (World Heritage Site). Carved during the Song dynasty (960–1279).

==== Miji Jingang (Guhyapāda) ====
In Chinese, he is known as Miji Jingang (密跡金剛) or Jingang Miji (金剛密跡) both meaning "The Vajra-being of Secret Traces". He is a vajra-holding protector deity from Buddhist scripture. In Buddhist iconographic form, he wields a vajra mallet "vajra-pāṇi" (a diamond club, thunderbolt stick, or sun symbol) and bares his teeth. His mouth is depicted as being open to form the "ha" or "ah" sound, which is the beginning character of the vocalization of the first grapheme of Sanskrit Devanāgarī (ॐ) representing the word Om. In Chinese folk religion and Taoism, he is also known as General Ha (哈将; Hā Jiāng) in reference to this iconographic detail. In Chinese Buddhist temples, his statue is usually built opposite that of another Vajra-holding god (who is known as Nārāyaṇa) and the pair usually stand guarding temple entrance gates called Shanmen (山門). In Chinese Buddhist belief, the two vajra-wielders Guhyapāda and Nārāyaṇa are manifestations of the bodhisattva Vajrapani.

In addition, Guhyapada is also sometimes paired or identified with the Wisdom King Ucchuṣma, who is commonly known as Huiji Jingang (穢跡金剛). In a thirteenth-century Chinese long gāthā elaborating on the two major scriptures relating to Ucchusama, the Huiji Jin’gang Shuo Shentong Daman Tuoluoni Fashu Lingyao Men (穢跡金剛說神通大滿陀羅尼法術靈要 門經; "The Scripture of the Numinous and Essential Gate to the Ritual Techniques of the Great Perfection Dhāraṇī of Supernatural Power as Spoken by the Vajra-being of Impure Traces"; T. 1228"), and the Huiji Jin’gang Jin Baibian Fajing (穢跡金剛禁百變法經; "The Scripture of the Rites of the Vajra-being of Impure Traces for Binding the Hundred Transformations"; T. 1229"), Ucchuṣma's Chinese name Huiji Jingang was changed to Miji Jingang due to negative connotations associated with the former name. In the Chongbian Zhutian Zhuan (重編諸天傳; 'Recompiled Biographies of Devas and Devīs') from the Southern Song period, one of the Sanskrit transliterations given for Guhyapāda is Ucchuṣma. In a repentance ritual for the Śūraṅgama Sūtra, both Guhyapāda and Ucchusama were invoked as a pair. The two wrathful deities were also sometimes found standing opposite each other at the entrances of some monasteries.

==== Sanzhi Dajiang (Pañcika) ====
In Chinese, he is known as Sanzhi Dajiang (散脂大將). In Buddhist cosmology, he is regarded as a yaksha and consort of Guizimu, whom he is often portrayed as standing next to in temple statues and iconography. He is also sometimes regarded as one of the Eight Great Yakṣa Generals under the command of Vaiśravaṇa. In Buddhist iconographic form, he bears a demonic face with fangs in his mouth and fire emerging from his eyes.

==== Weituo (Skanda) ====
In Chinese, he is known as Weituo Tian (韋馱天) or Weituo Pusa (韋馱菩薩), which is a corrupted form of his original Chinese name Jiantuo Tian (建陀天) or Jiantuo Pusa (建陀菩薩), which in turn is a Chinese transcription of his name in Sanskrit. He is viewed as either a protective deva or as a Bodhisattva in Chinese Buddhism. His Buddhist iconography has been syncretized with Chinese elements to a large extent, so he is commonly depicted as wearing traditionary Chinese military armor and wielding a Chinese sword. According to a legend, a few days after the Buddha's passing and cremation, evil demons stole his tooth relic. In response, Weituo made a vow to protect the Buddhist Dharma and followed it up by defeating the evil demons and returning the relics. In Chinese Buddhist Temples, he is often enshrined together with his counterpart, Qielan (personified as the historical general Guan Yu), protecting a third statue of a Buddha or a Bodhisattva.

==== Ditian (Pṛthvī) ====
In Chinese, she is known as Ditian (地天), meaning "Earth Devī", or Jianlao Dishen (堅牢地神) and Jianluo Ditian (堅牢地天), both meaning "Firm earth goddess". In Buddhist cosmology, she is considered a goddess of the earth and one of the four beings wielding thunderbolts in the Diamond Realm of Chinese Esoteric Buddhism. In Buddhist iconographic form, she has either four or two arms and wields a flower vase and farming tools in her hands.

==== Spirit of the Bodhi Tree ====
In Chinese, she is known as Puti Shushen (菩提樹神). She is regarded as a goddess who guards the Bodhi Tree or a manifestation of the tree itself. In Buddhist iconographic form, she holds branches of the Bodhi tree in her hands.

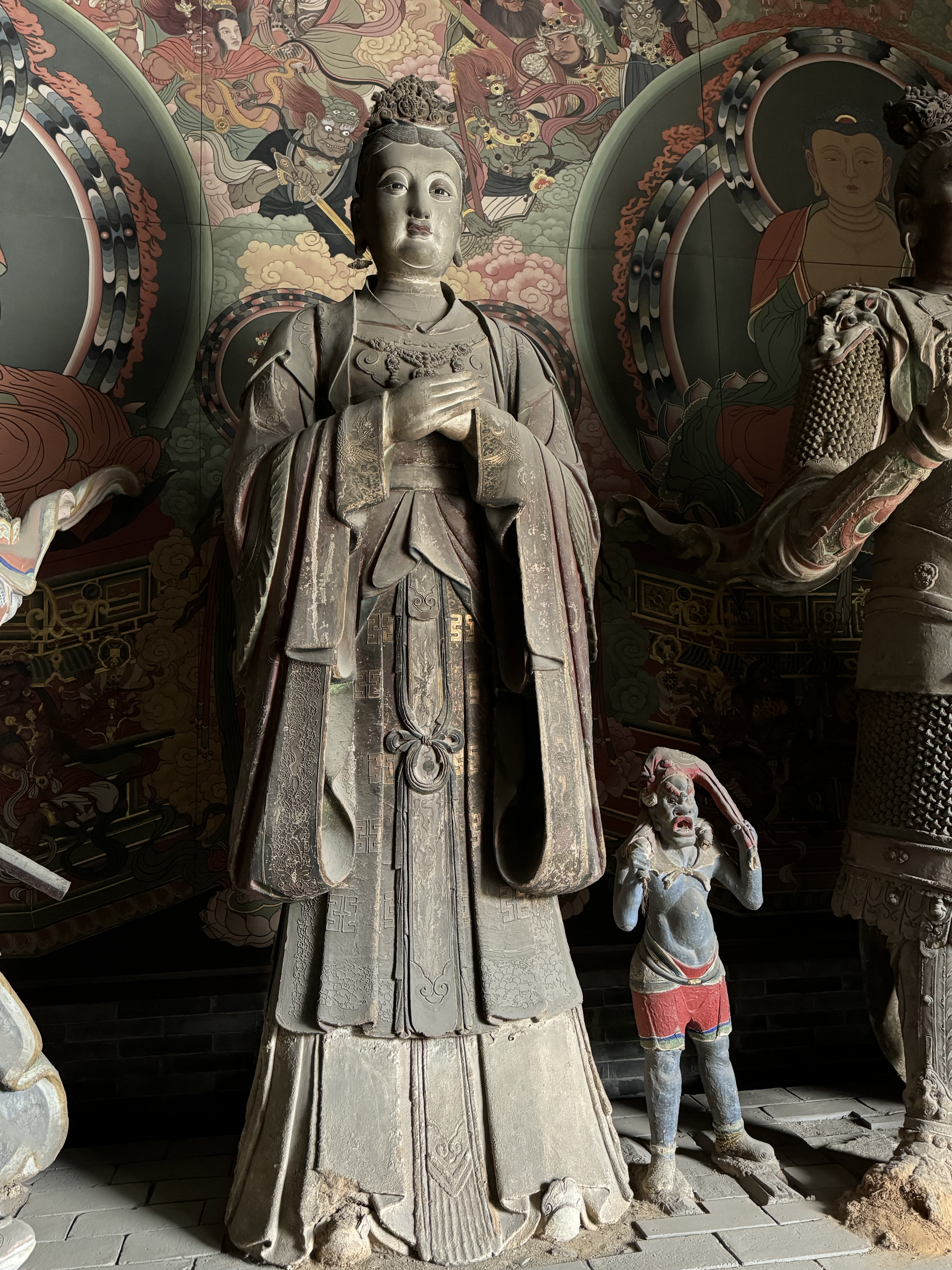
Jin dynasty (1115 - 1234) statue of Guizimu (Hārītī) with a child rakshasa in Shanhua Temple (善化寺) in Datong, Shanxi Province, China

==== Guizimu (Hārītī) ====
In Chinese, she is known as Guizimu (鬼子母). In Buddhist cosmology, she is considered a demon consort of Pañcika who was converted to Buddhism by the Buddha. Considered a protector deity of children. According to Buddhist legends, Hārītī was originally a rākṣasī of Rajgir at the same time that Gautama Buddha also lived there. She had hundreds of children of her own, whom she loved and doted upon, but to feed them, she abducted and killed the children of others. The bereaved mothers of her victims pleaded to the Buddha to save them. So, the Buddha stole the most beloved of her sons, and hid him under his rice bowl. After having desperately searched for her missing son throughout the universe, Hārītī finally appealed to the Buddha for help. The Buddha pointed out that she was suffering because she lost one of hundreds of children, and asked if she could imagine the suffering of parents whose only child had been devoured. She then repented and vowed to protect all children. In doing so, Hārītī became regarded as the protector of children and women in childbirth. In Chinese Buddhist iconographic form, she is often portrayed as standing with a child or several children or as holding a child in her arm.

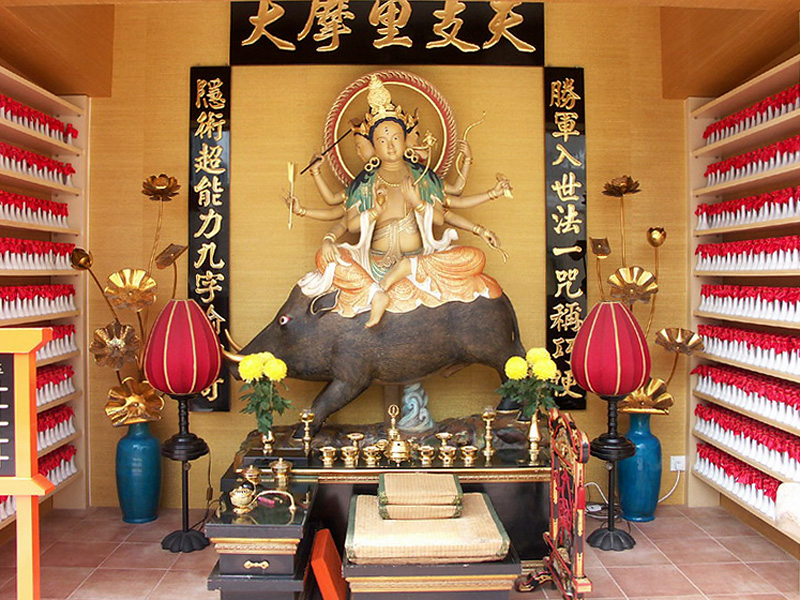
Statue of Mólìzhītiān (Mārīcī) with eight-arms and four faces riding on a boar in Hongfashan Temple, Hong Kong

==== Molizhitian (Mārīcī) ====
In Chinese, she is known as Molizhitian (摩利支天). She is sometimes regarded as a goddess and sometimes regarded as a Bodhisattva. In Chinese Buddhism, she is sometimes considered an incarnation of the Bodhisattva Cundī, with whom she shares similar iconography. She is also worshiped as the goddess of light and warfare and as the guardian of all nations, whom she protects from the fury of war. In addition, she is also identified with Mahēśvarī (Parvati), the consort of Maheśvara, and therefore has the title Mātrikā (佛母; Fo mǔ), Mother of the Myriad Buddhas. In Buddhist iconographic form, she has eight arms, each holding different types of weapons, and rides on a chariot drawn by eight boars. In another iconographic form, she is portrayed sitting down holding a fan. In Chinese folk religion and Taoism, she is sometimes identified as the goddess Doumu (斗母元君; Dǒumǔ Yuánjūn), who is the personification of the Big Dipper as well as the feminine aspect of the cosmic God of Heaven.

==== Suojieluo Longwang (Sāgara) ====
In Chinese, he is known as Suojieluo Longwang (娑竭羅龍王). In Chinese Buddhism, he is regarded as one of the Eight Dragon Kings who presides over the world's supply of rain, as well as one of sixteen Nāga that are spared from the assault of the garudas. He is also regarded as one of the Twenty-Eight Guardian deities of the thousand-armed manifestation of the Bodhisattva Guanyin. In some Mahayana sutras, his palace is said to lie at the bottom of the ocean and is 84,000 yojanas in length and width with an array of decorations that are seven-fold, including walls, banisters, jeweled nets and seven rows of trees. The palace is adorned with the seven treasures and is filled with the song of innumerable birds.

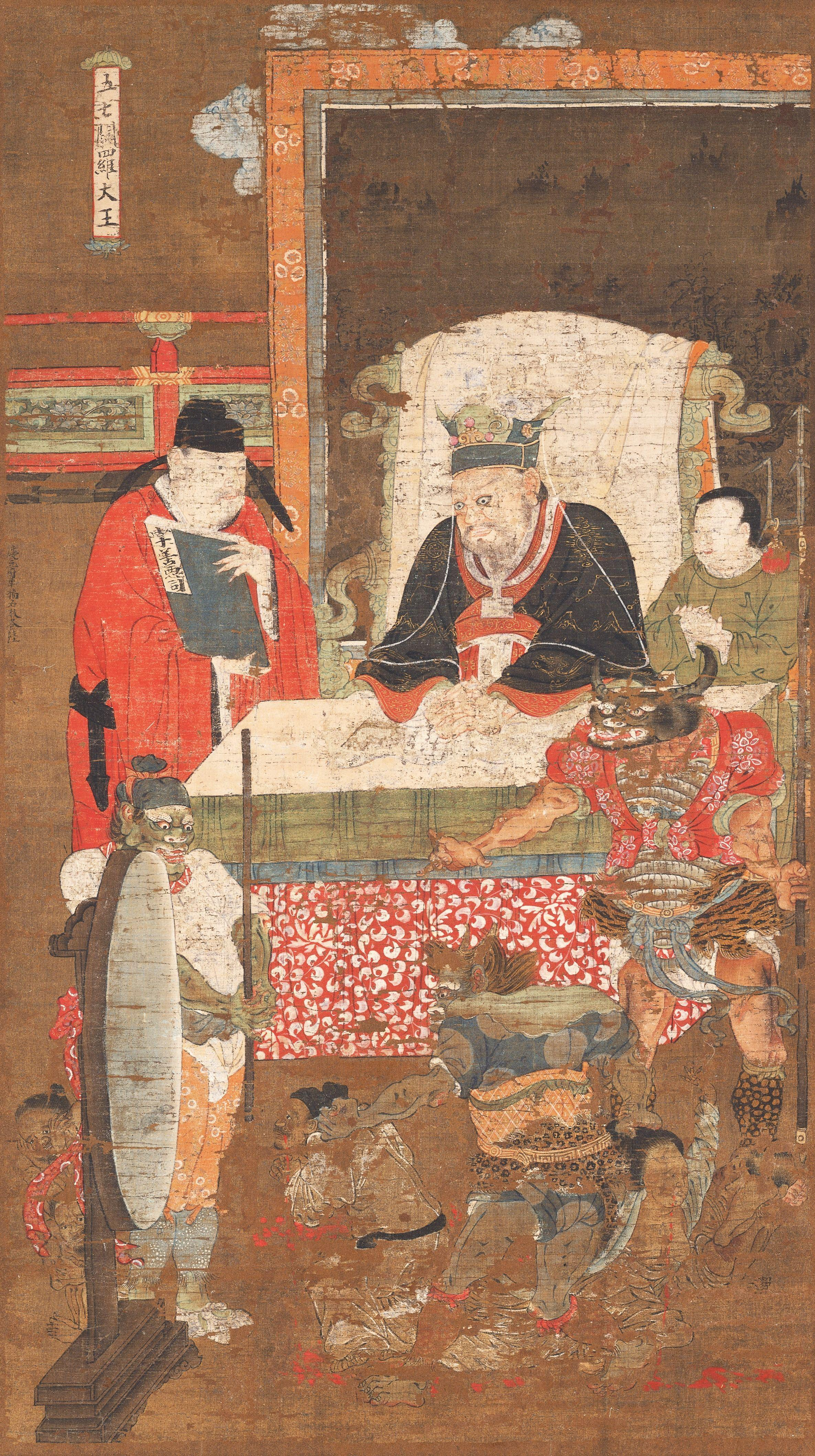
14th century Chinese Yuan dynasty portrait of Yanluo Wang. One of a series of paintings of the "Ten Kings of Hell" by Lu Xinzhong.

==== Yanluo Wang (Yama) ====
In Chinese, he is known as Yanluo Wang (閻羅王) or Yanmoluo Wang (閻摩羅王). In Buddhist cosmology, he is considered as one of the Ten Kings of Hell who judges the souls of the dead in a court in the realm of the underworld. In Buddhist iconographic form, he is usually portrayed as a large man with a scowling red face, bulging eyes, and a long beard. He wears traditional judge robes and a judge's cap or a crown which bears the character for "king" (王). He has also been syncretized into Taoism and Chinese folk religion as a god of the dead as well, performing largely the same functions as his Chinese Buddhist counterpart.

==== Jinnaluo Wang (Kinnara King) ====
In Chinese, he is known as Jǐnnàluó Wáng (緊那羅王). In Buddhist iconographic form, depicted as either male or female. The male form has a horse head with a male body. Some Buddhist also venerates him as their Kitchen God as an equivalent to the traditional Taoist Zao Jun. In the Shaolin tradition, he is conflated with Vajrapani (in his manifestation as Nārāyaṇa) and is identified as an avatar of the Bodhisattva Guanyin, who manifested to defend the Shaolin monastery from bandits during the Yuan-era Red Turban Rebellion.

==== Emperor Ziwei ====
In Chinese, he is known as Ziwei Dadi (紫微大帝). Originally from Taoism, he is a personification of the North Star and considered to be the keeper of the book of destiny as well as a dispeller of demons who is revered for his power to ward off evil influences and spirits. In one iconographic form, he is portrayed as a standard Chinese official sitting on a throne. In another iconographic form, he is portrayed as a youth astride or sitting side-saddle atop a reclining mythical beast, holding a conch in his hands and dressed in trousers and a cape and wearing a tiara from which two objects, like insect feelers, project upwards.

==== Emperor Dongyue ====
In Chinese, he is known as Dongyue Dadi (東嶽大帝). Originally from Taoism, he is regarded as a god who resides at Mount Tai and judges what realm of Saṃsāra a person will be reborn in. He is also believed to be the leader of a large bureaucratic celestial ministry overseeing the maintenance of the Book of Life, a register of the due dates on which each and every human soul must be summoned before the Judges of Hell for judgement.

==== Leigong ====
In Chinese, he is known as Leigong (雷公) or Leishen (雷神). Originally from Taoism, he is regarded as the god of thunder as well as a punisher of evil-doers who is feared as being particularly merciless towards those who oppress widows and orphans and those who kidnap children. His Buddhist iconographic form has been strongly influenced by that of Garuda from the Hindu pantheon to form a half-man and half-bird entity, bearing a pair of wings on his back and holding a hammer and a chisel in his hands as well as a sling of drums around his neck.

== Literature ==
The twenty-four deities are mentioned in the 16th century Ming dynasty novel Journey to the West (one of the Four Classic Chinese Novels) as attendants of the Bodhisattva Guanyin (the Chinese form of Avalokitesvara) who reside on her bodhimaṇḍa on the island of Mount Potalaka. In the novel, they serve as disciples who listen to Guanyin expound the Buddhist teachings as well as guardian protectors of her island.

== Gallery ==
Jin dynasty (1368-1644) statues of the Twenty-Four Deities in the Daxiong Baodian of Shanhua Temple in Datong, Shanxi, China

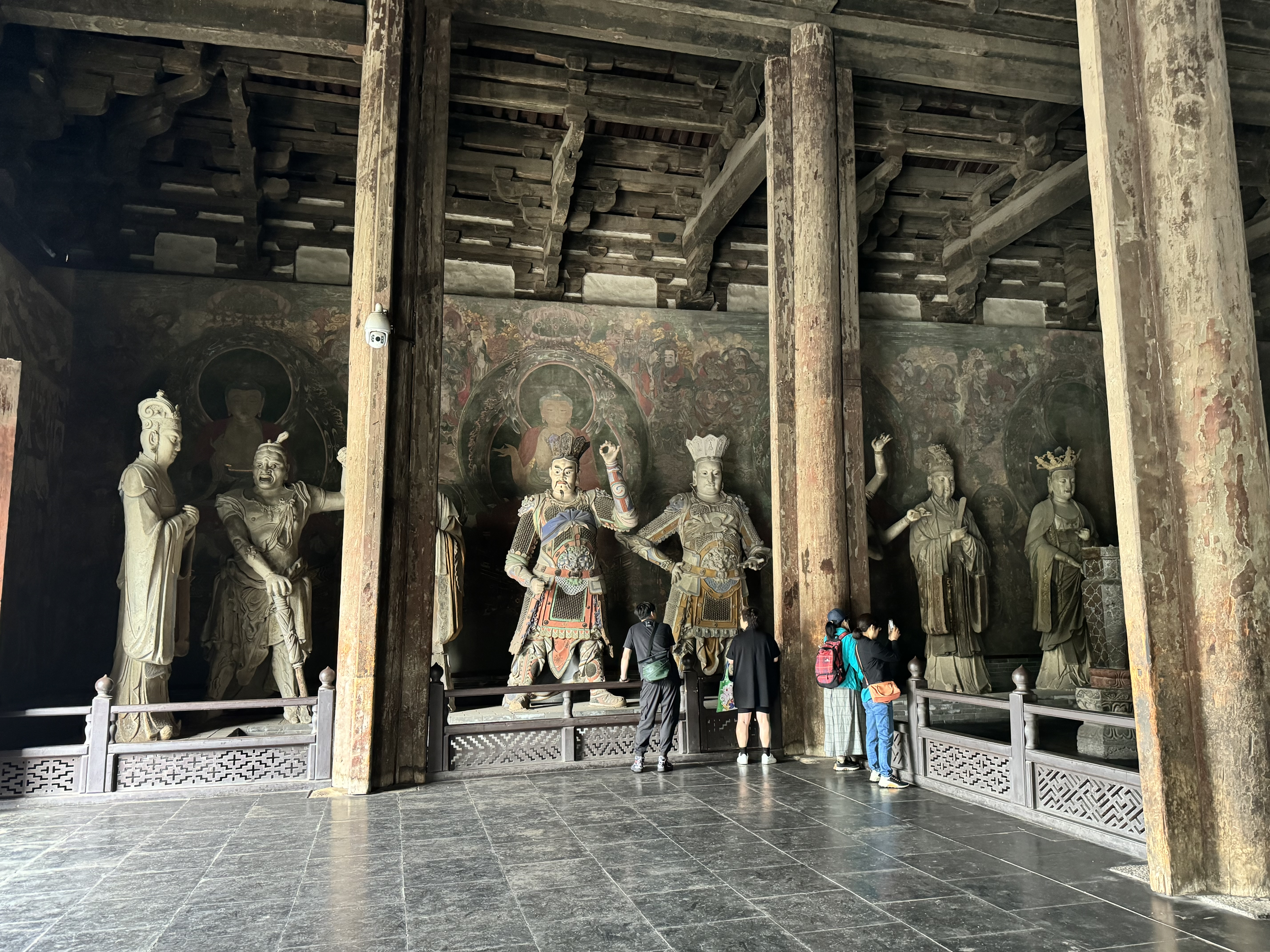
Statues of some of the Twenty-Four Deities on one side of the Daxiong Baodian

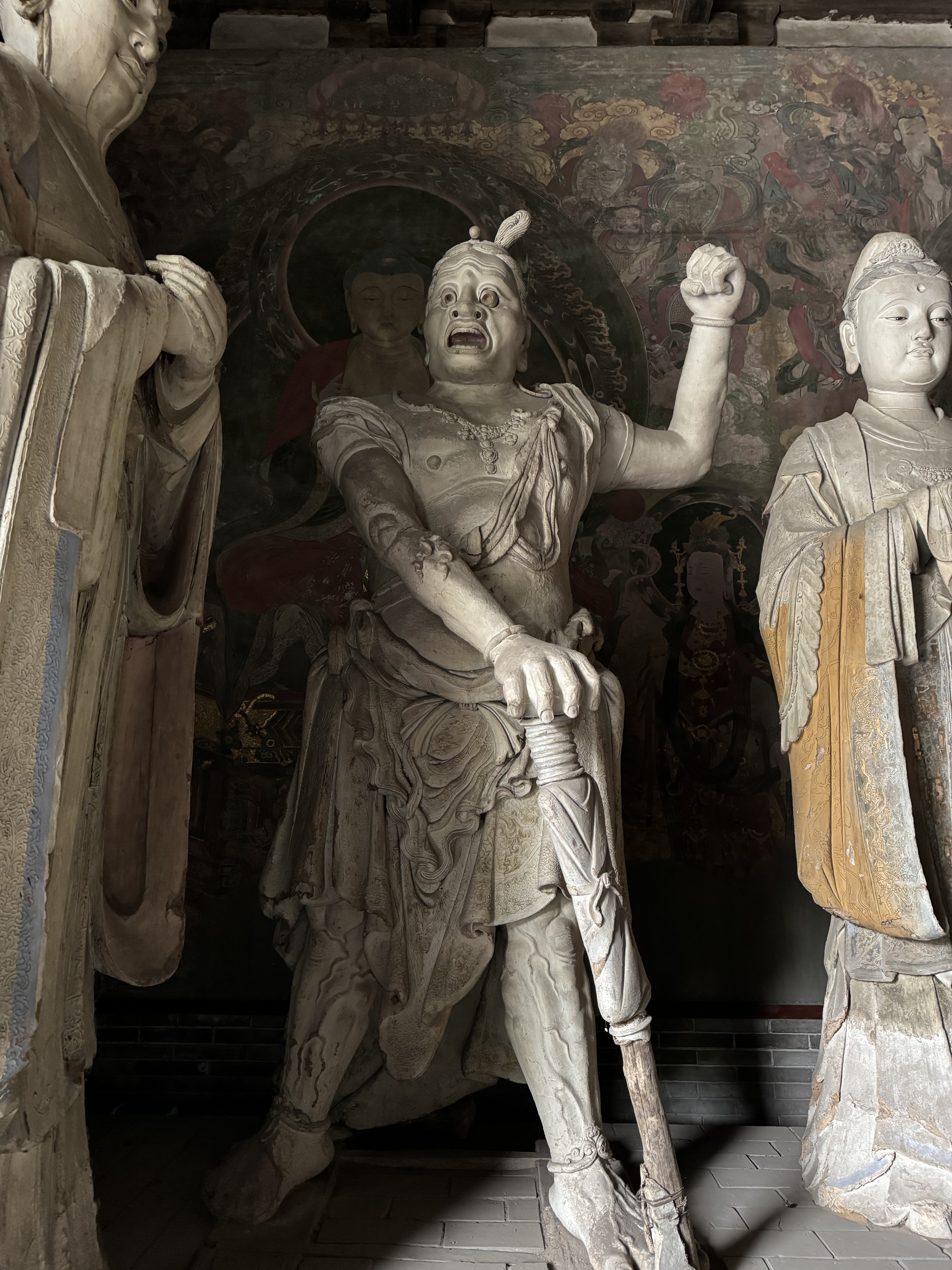
Statue of Miji Jingang

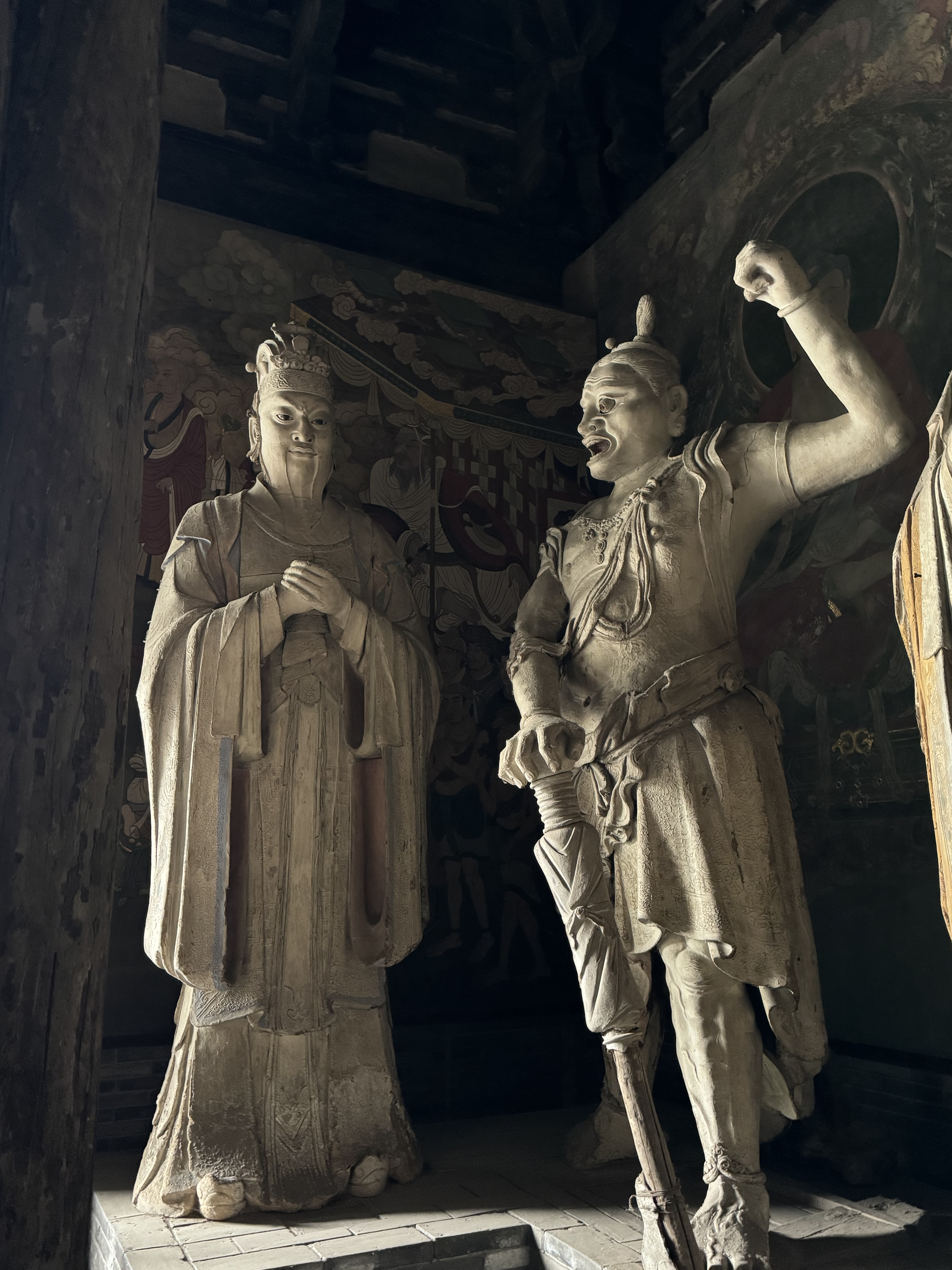
Statue of Shuitian (left) Miji Jingang (right)

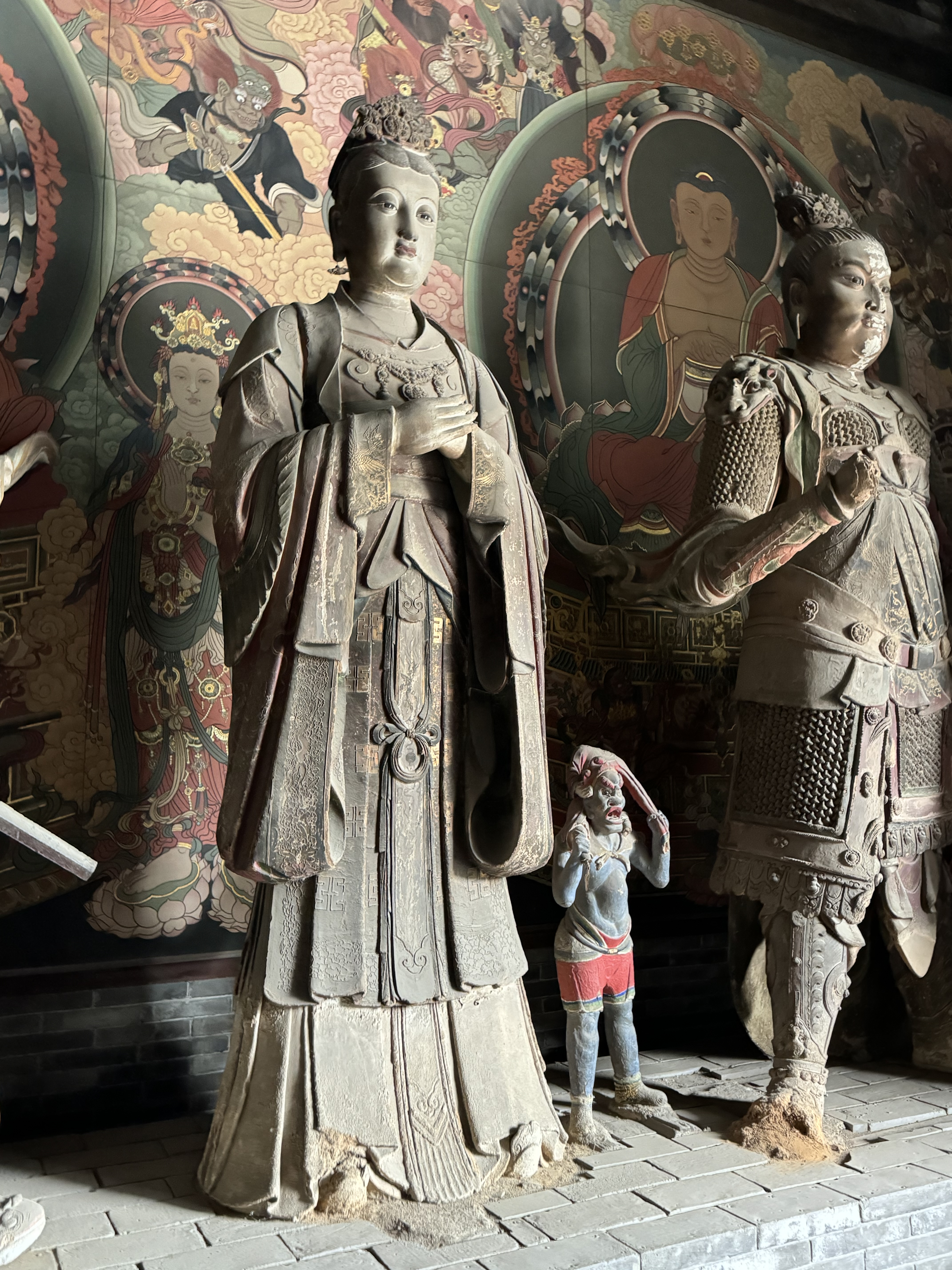
Statue of Guizimu with a child rakshasa

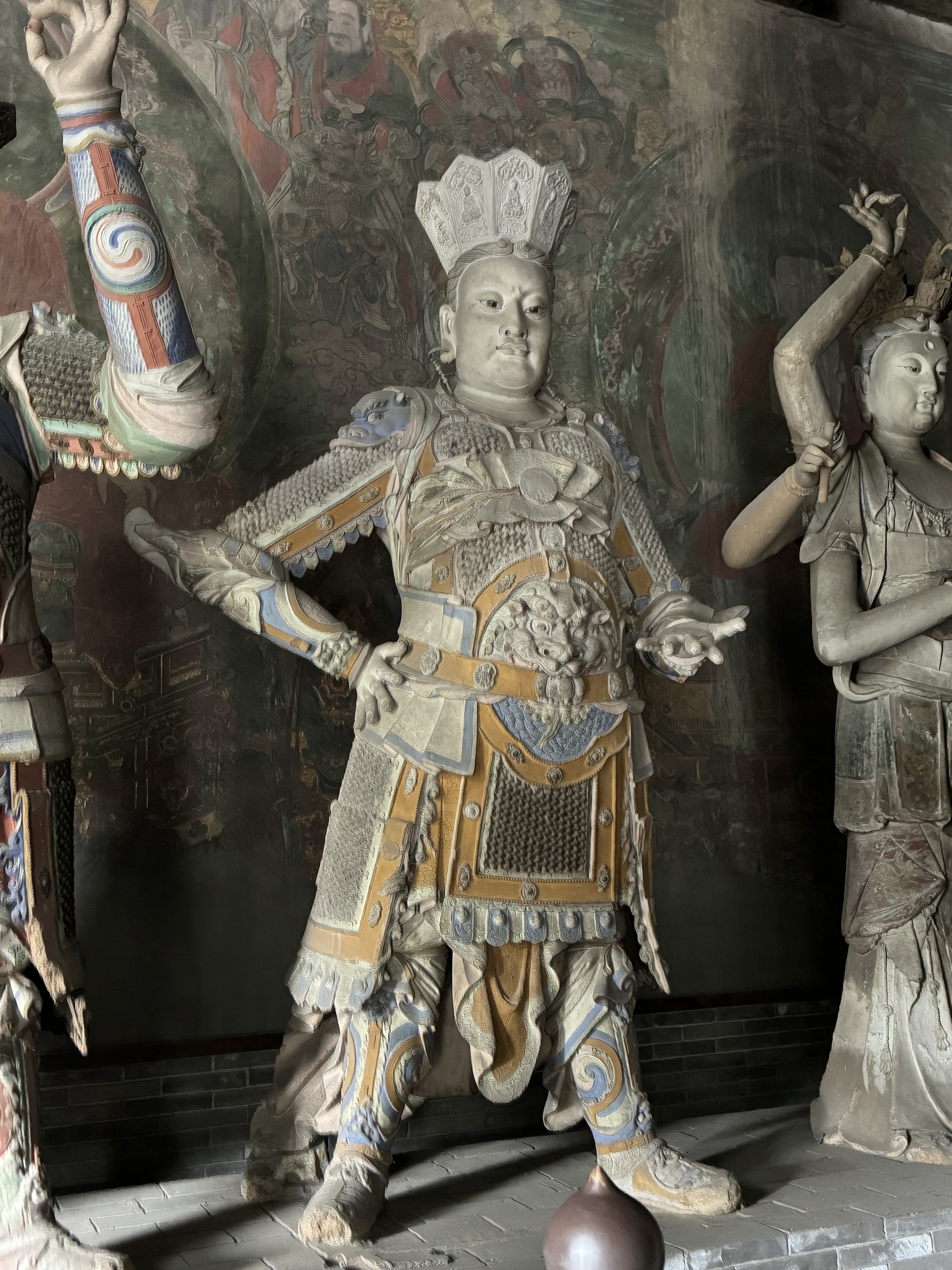
Statues of Duowen Tianwang (left)

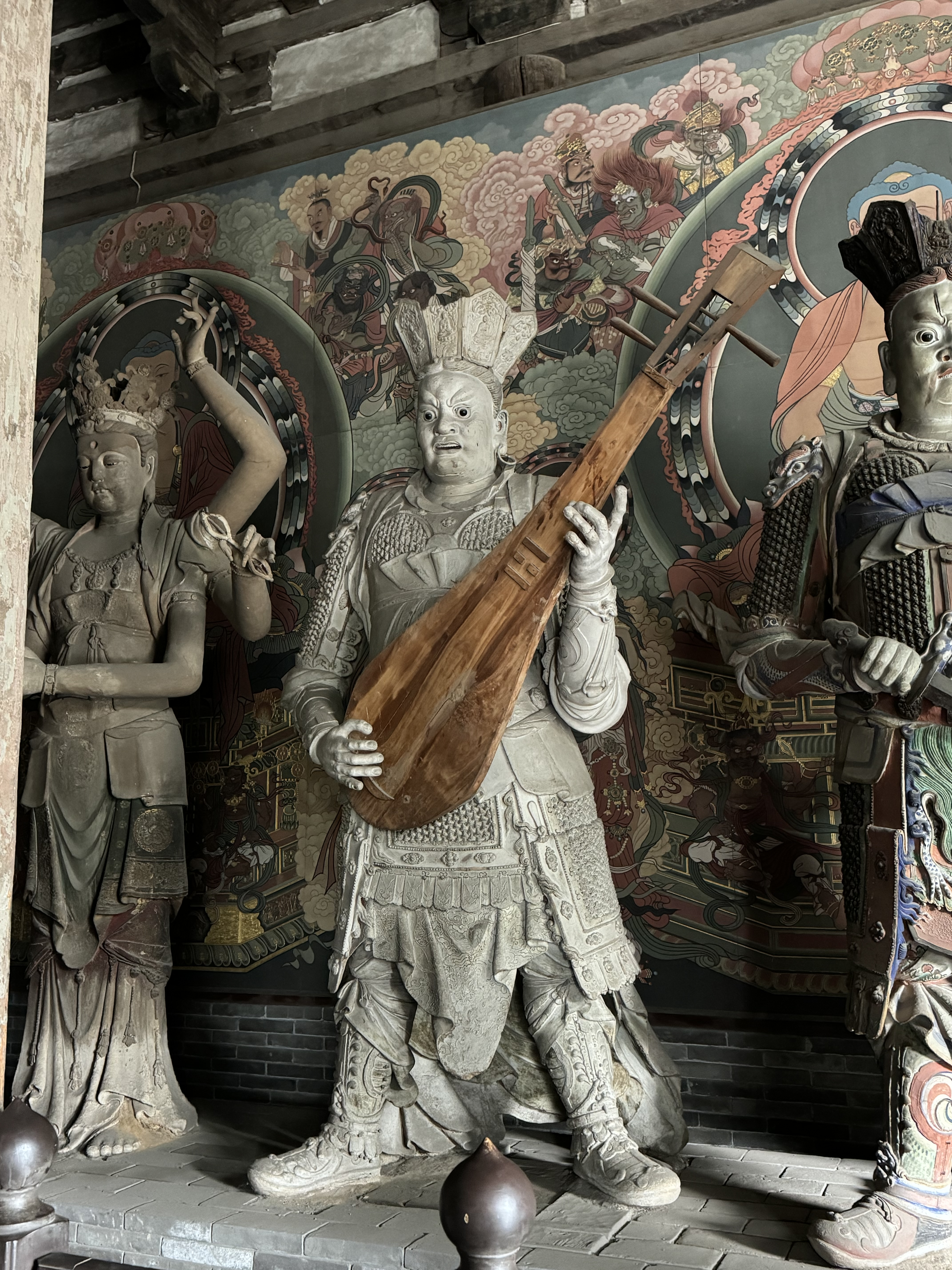
Statue of Chiguo Tianwang holding a pipa

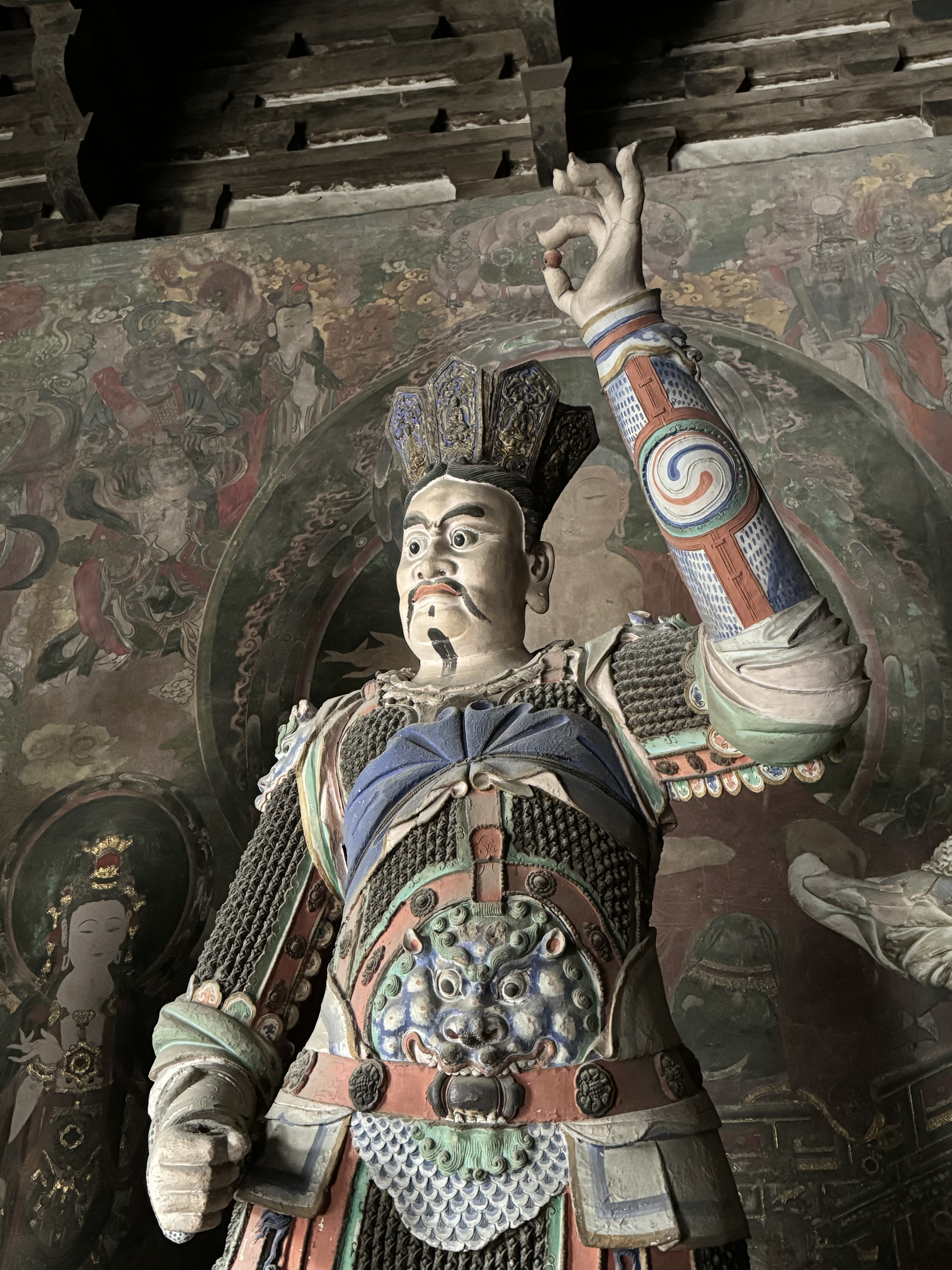
Statues of Guangmu Tianwang

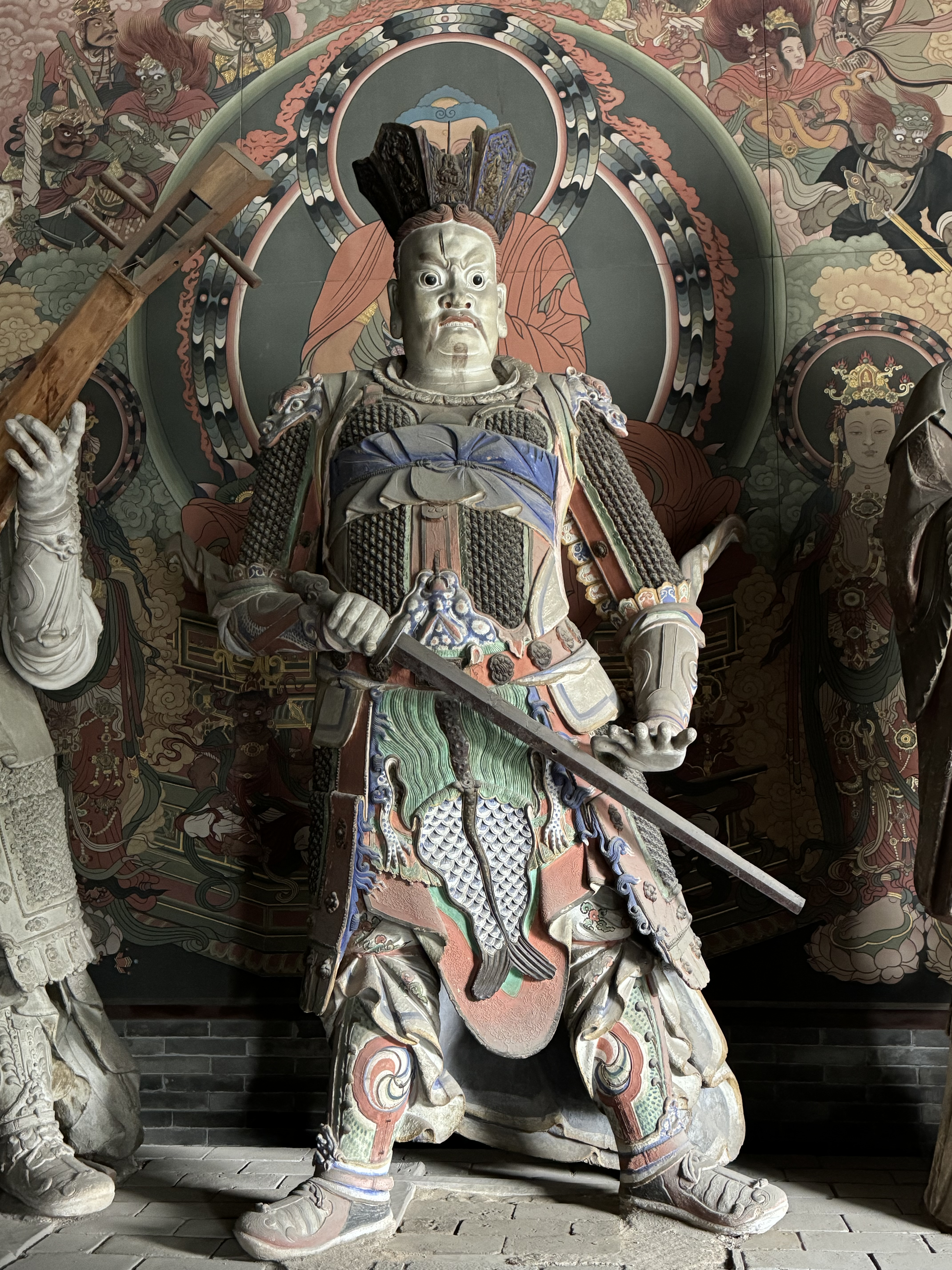
Statues of Zengzhang Tianwang

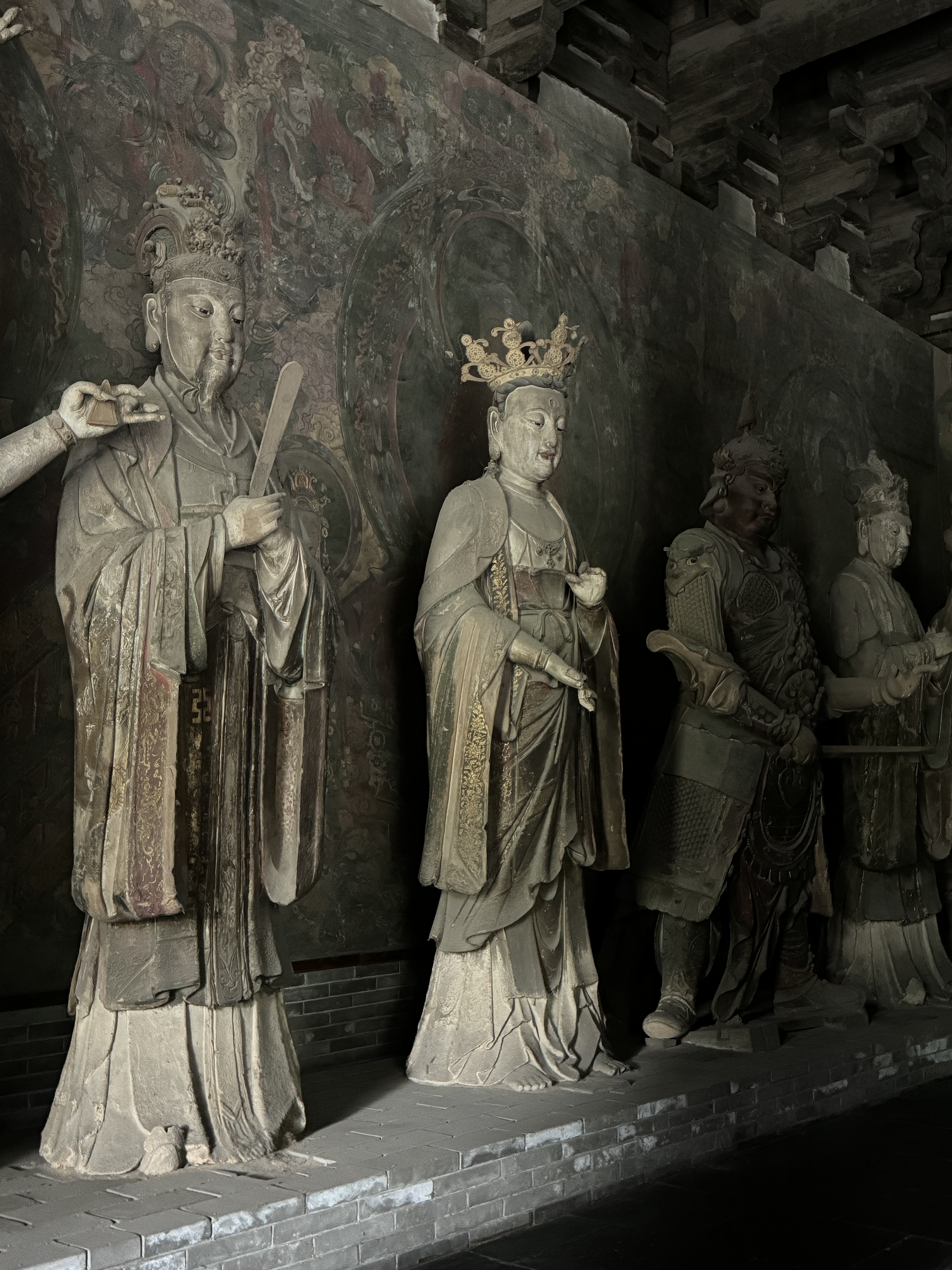
Statues of Fengtian (right) and Puti Shushen (right)

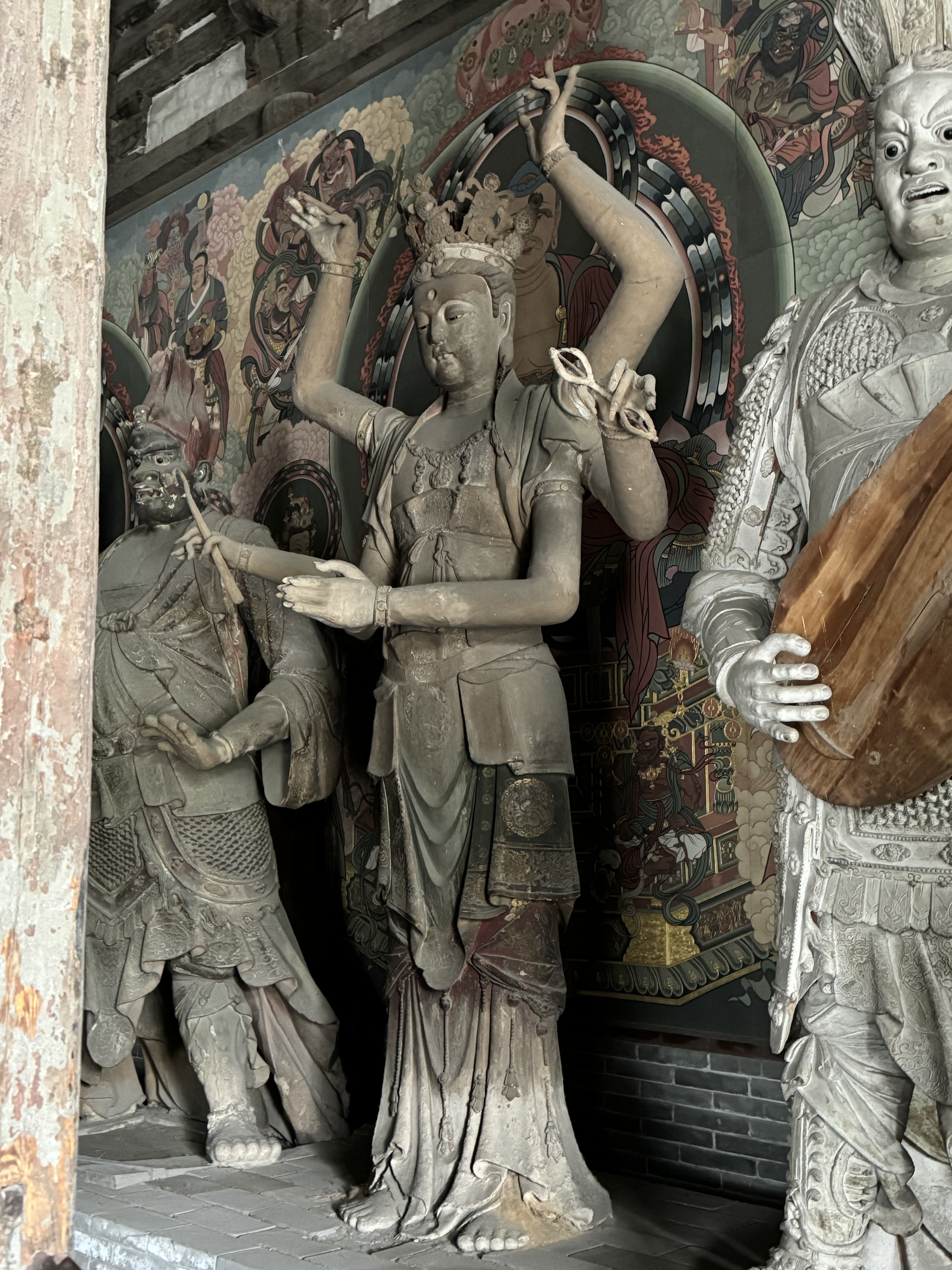
Statue of Molizhitian

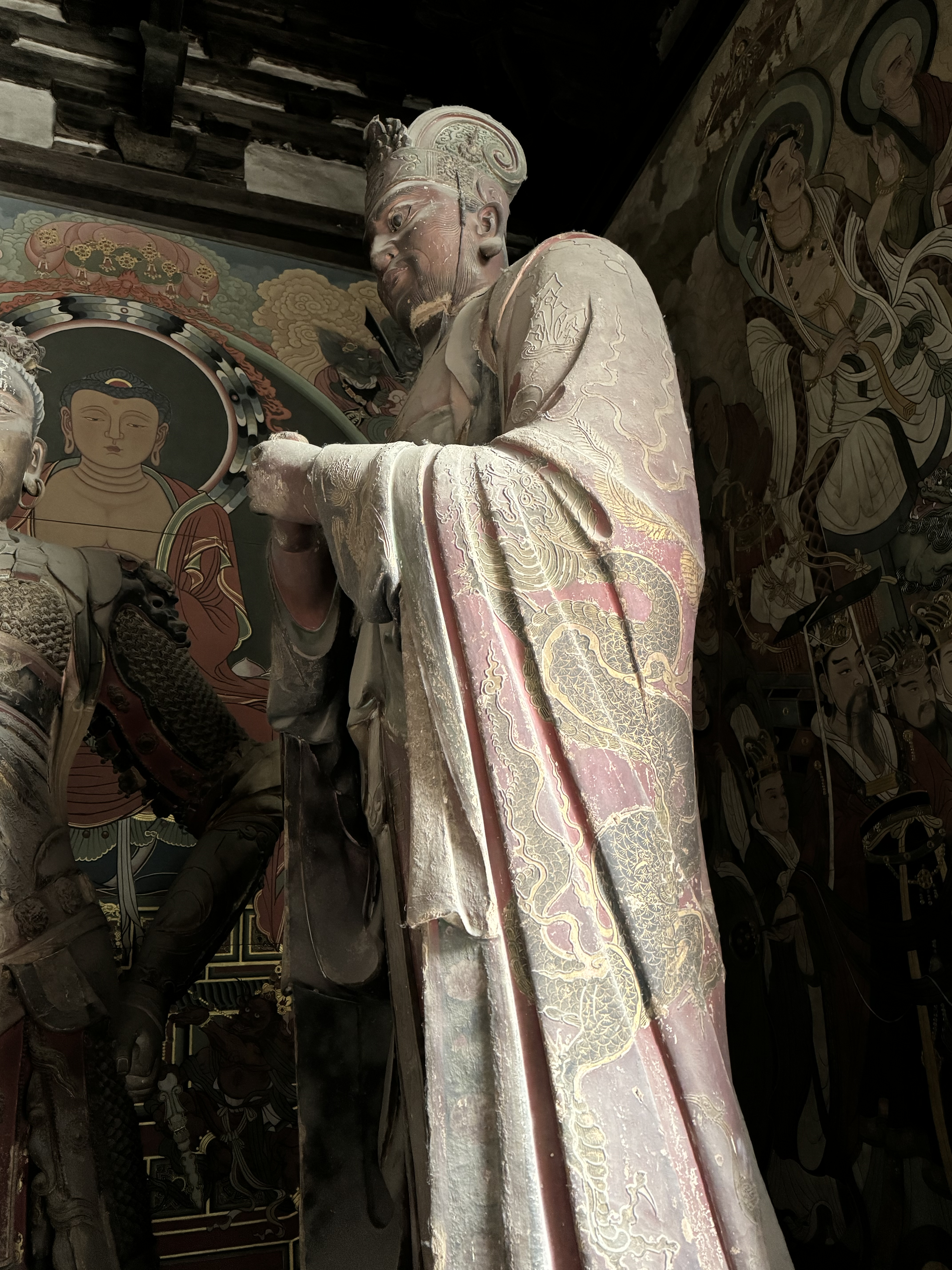
Statue of Yanluo Wang

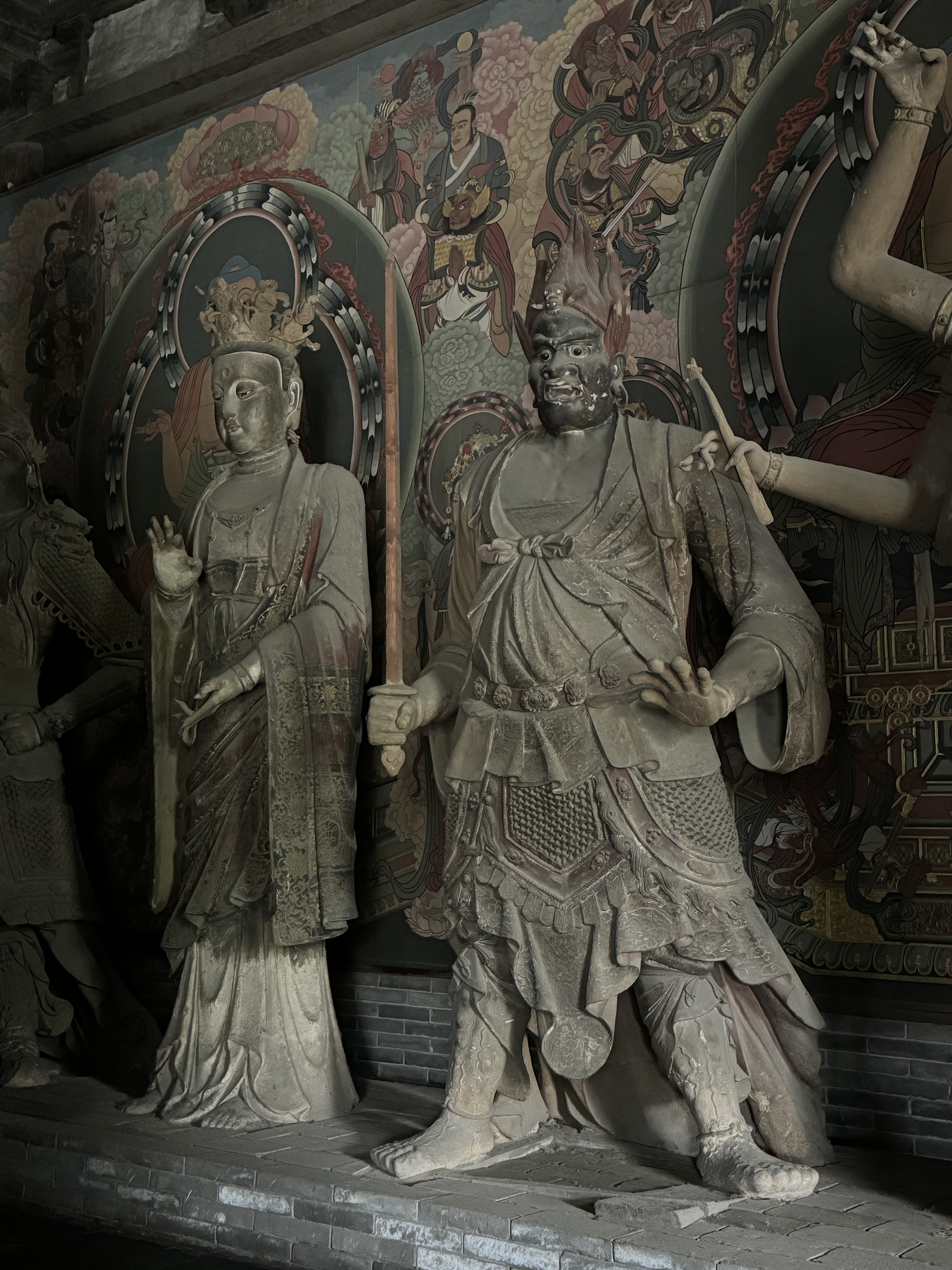
Statues of Ditian (left) and Huotian (right)

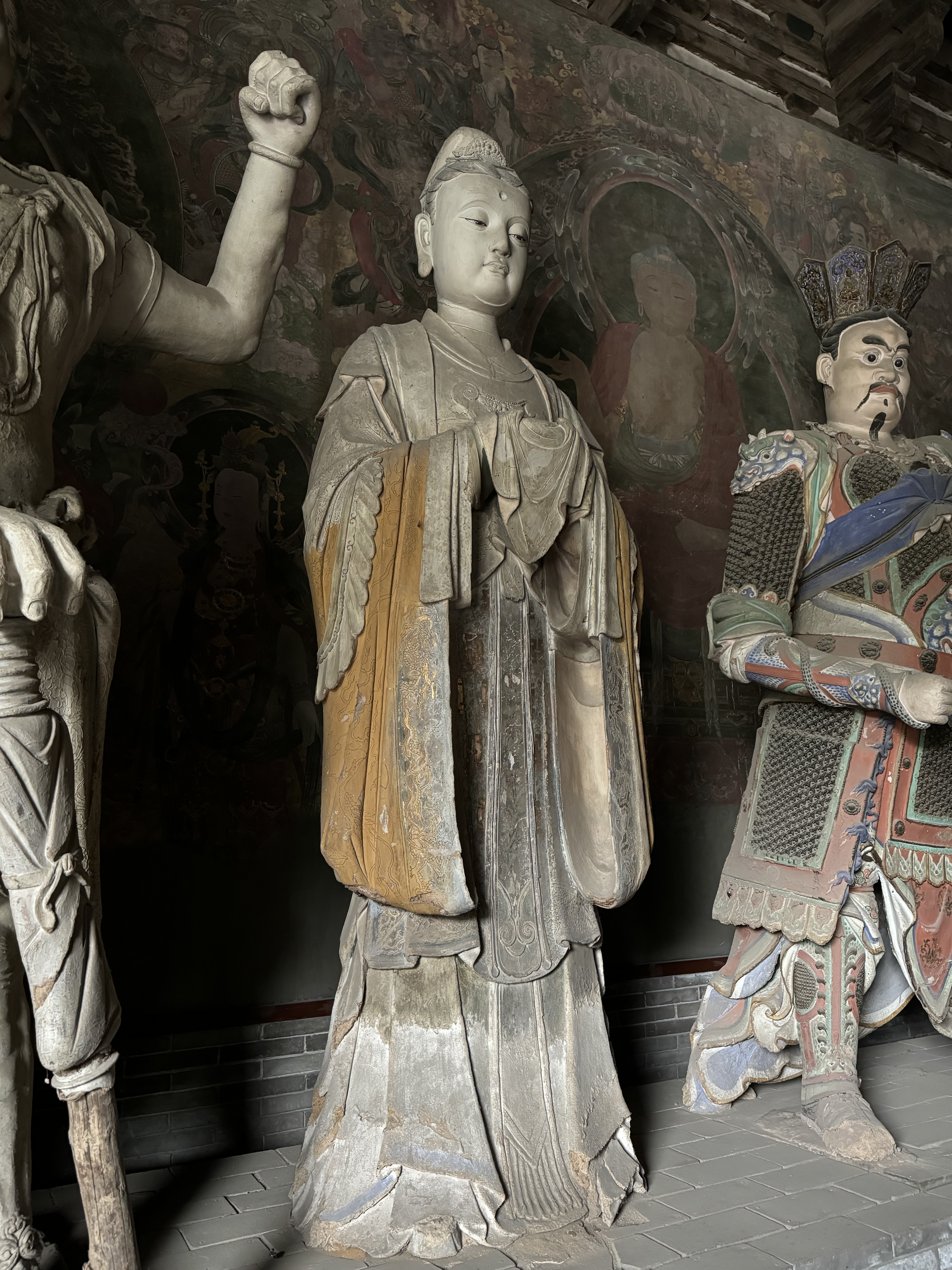
Statue of Jixiang Tiannü

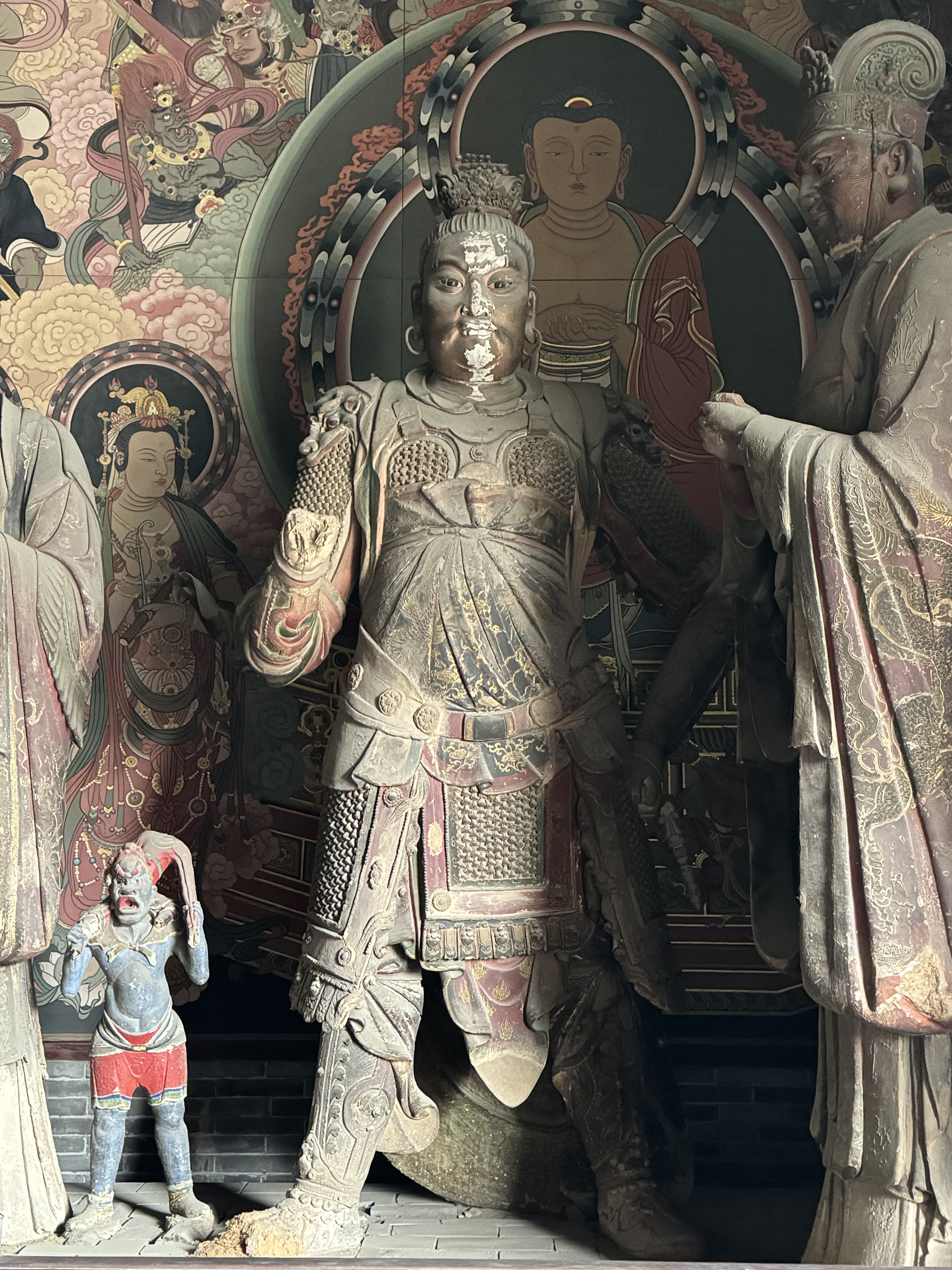
Statue of Shensha Dajiang

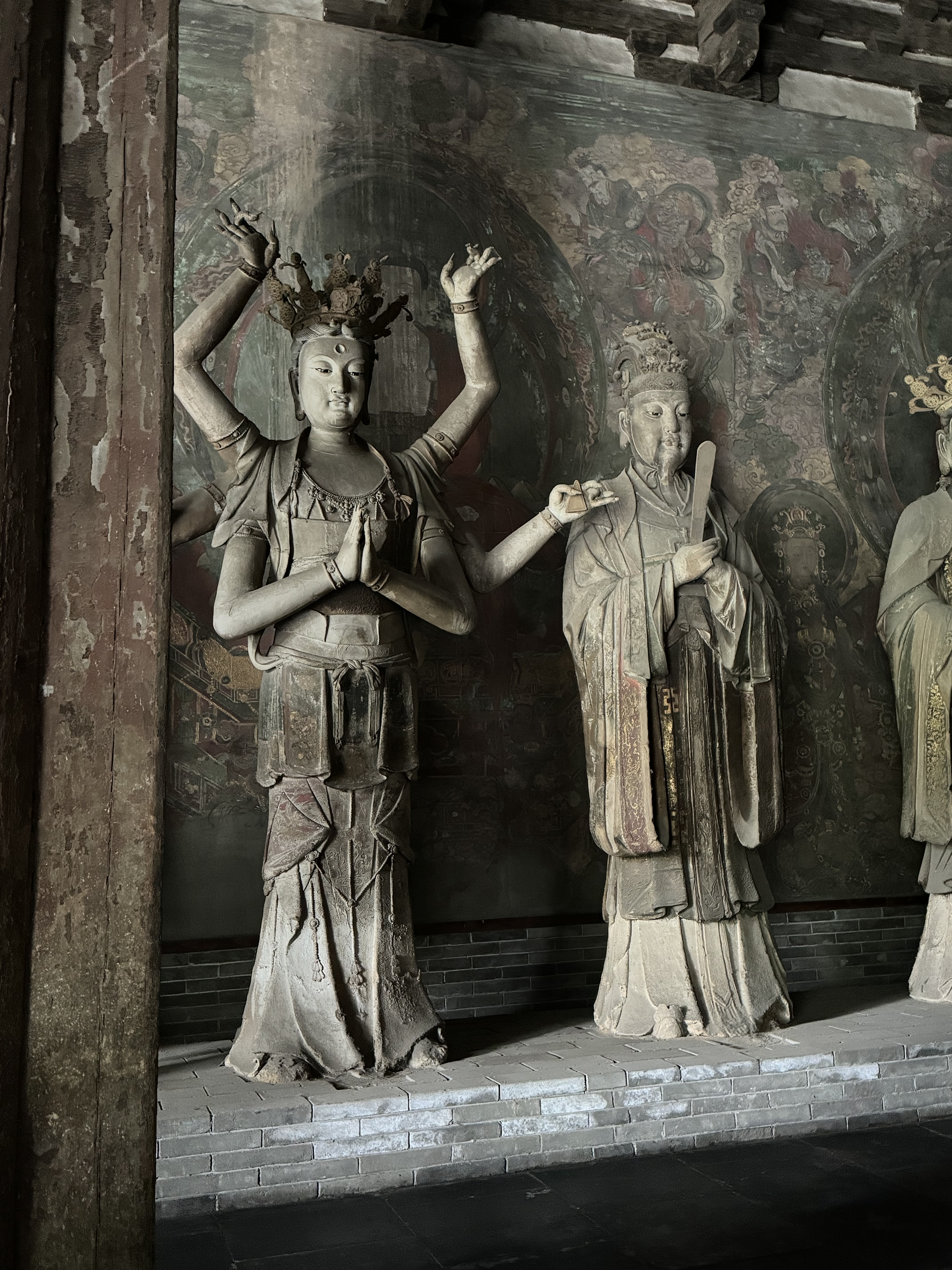
Statues of Biancaitian (left) and Fengtian (right)

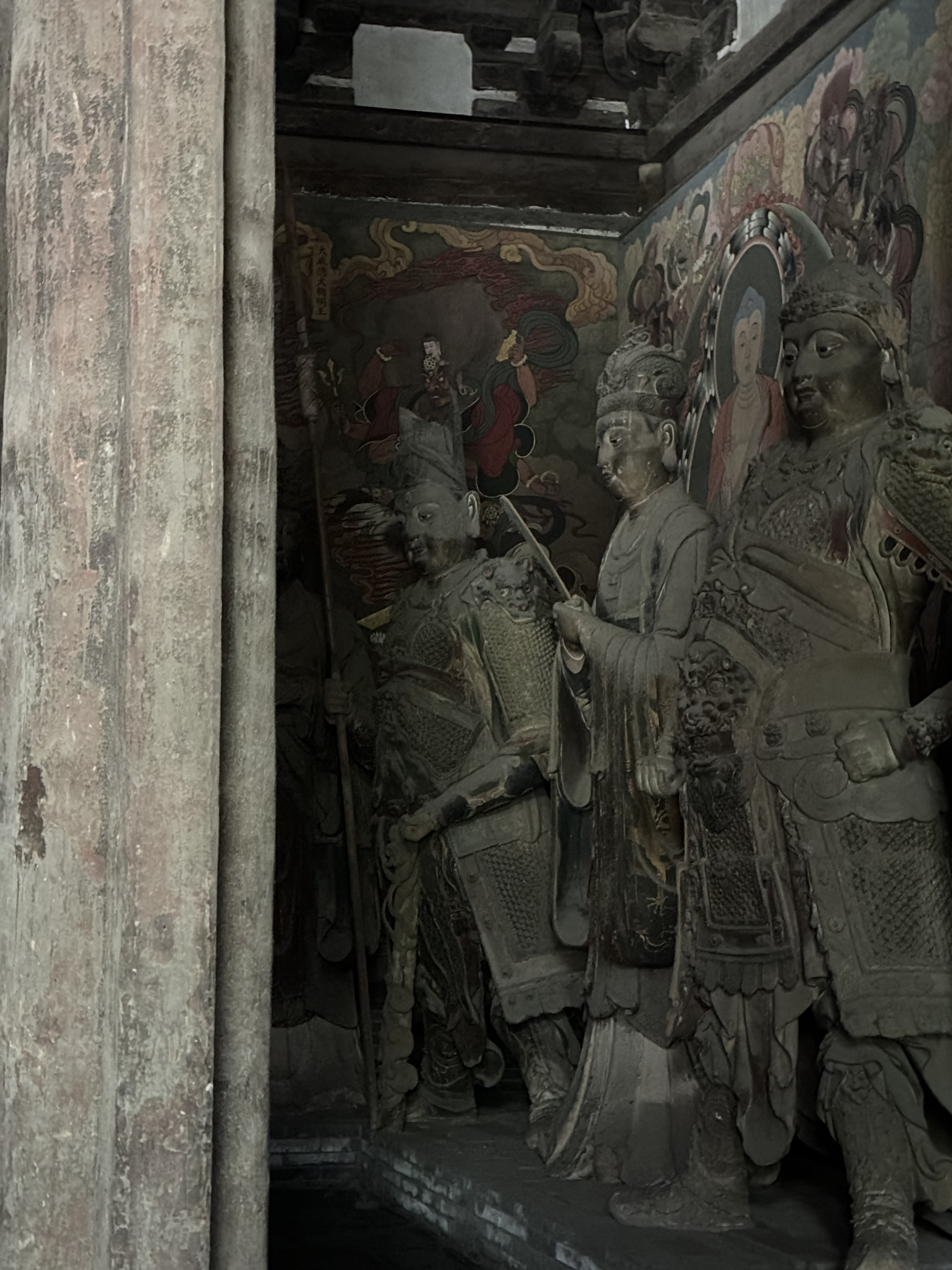
Statues of Sanzhi Dajiang (left) Ritian (center) and Weituo (right)

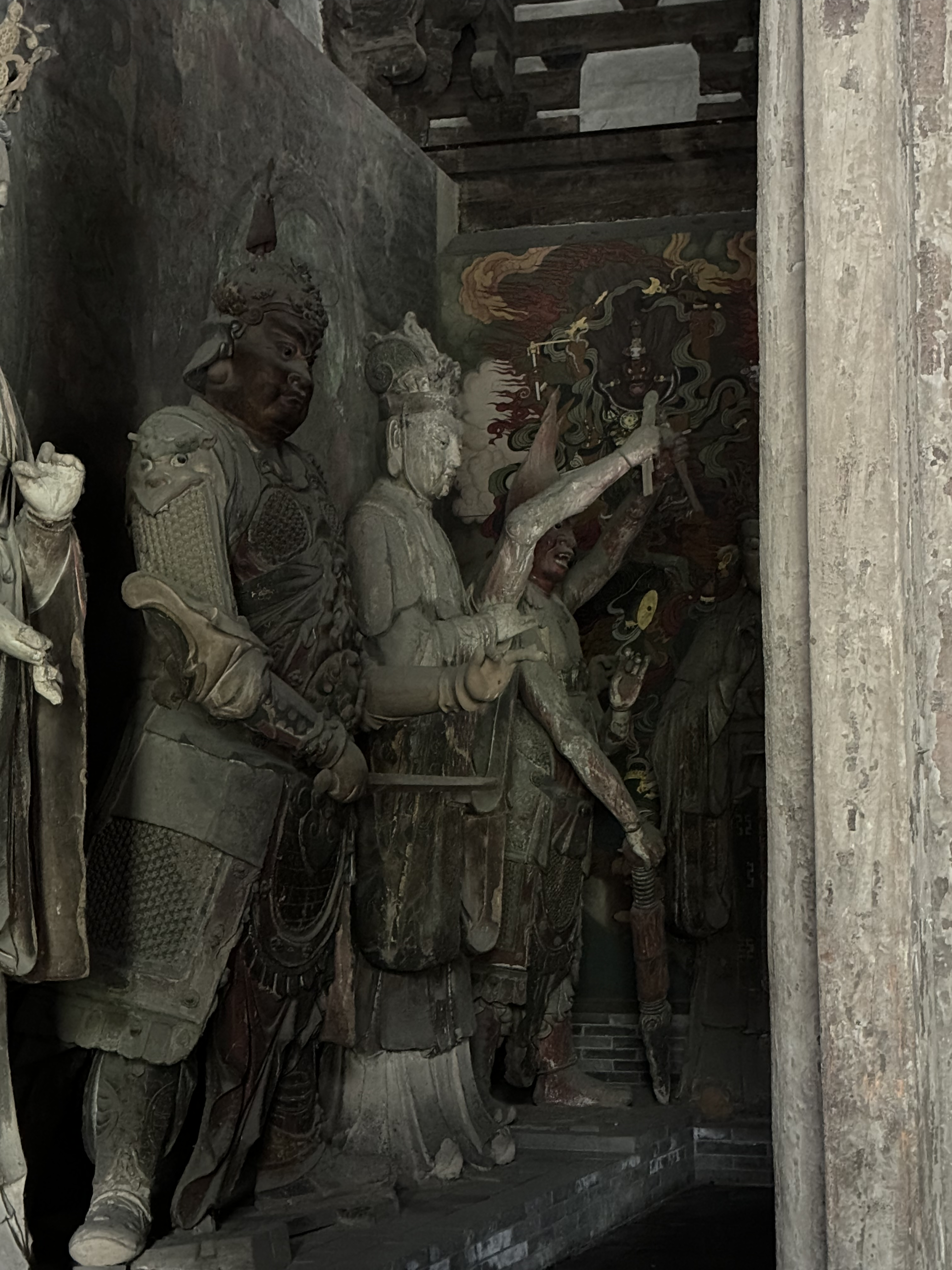
Statues of Luochatian (left) Yuetian (center) and Yishenatian (right)
Ming dynasty (1368-1644) statues of the Twenty-Four Deities in the Daxiong Baodian of Huayan Temple in Datong, Shanxi, China

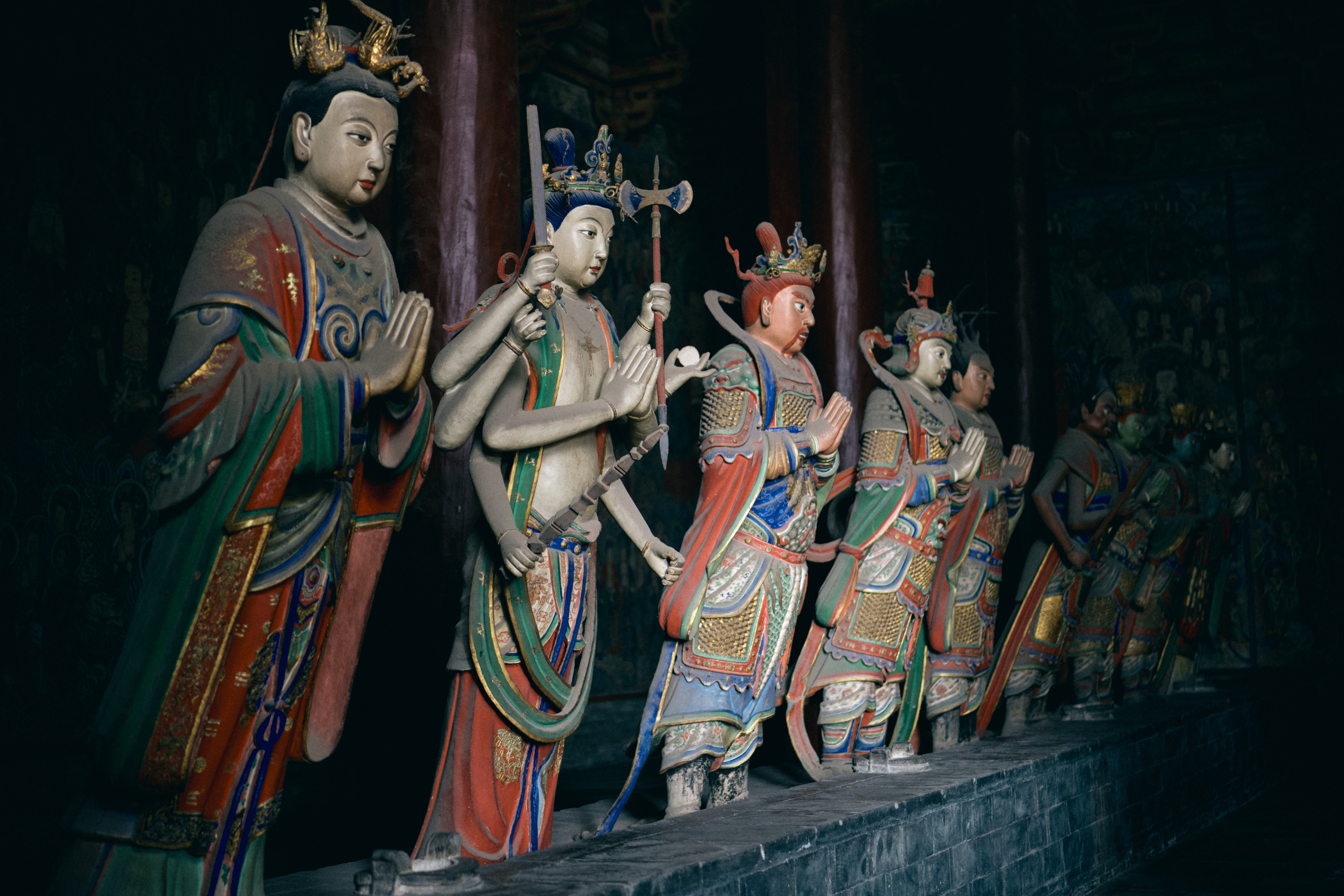
Statues on the left side of the hall

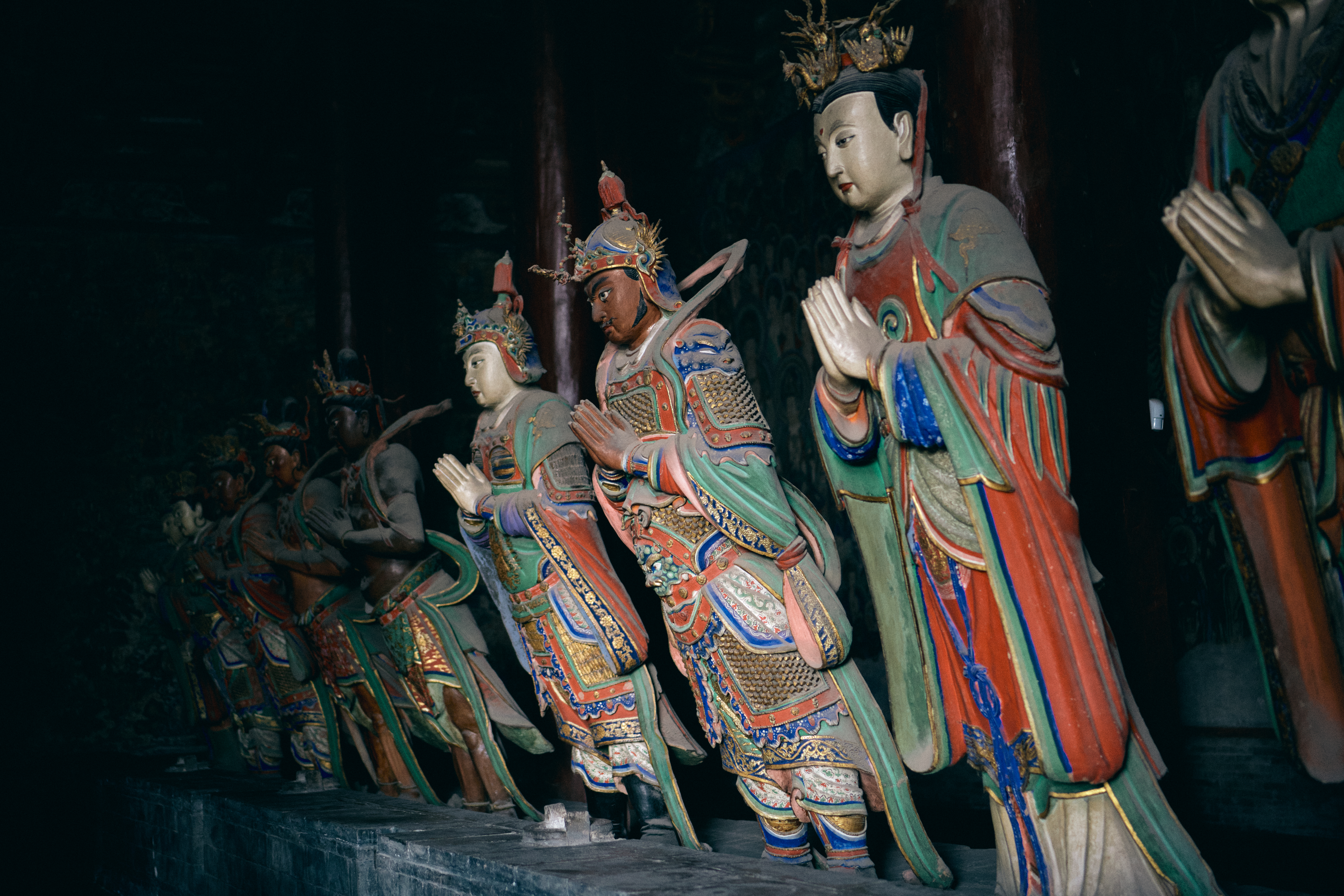
Statues on the right side of the hall
Edo period (1600-1868) statues of the Twenty-Four Deities in the Daiyū Hōden of Hōrin-ji in Hamamatsu, Shizuoka, Japan

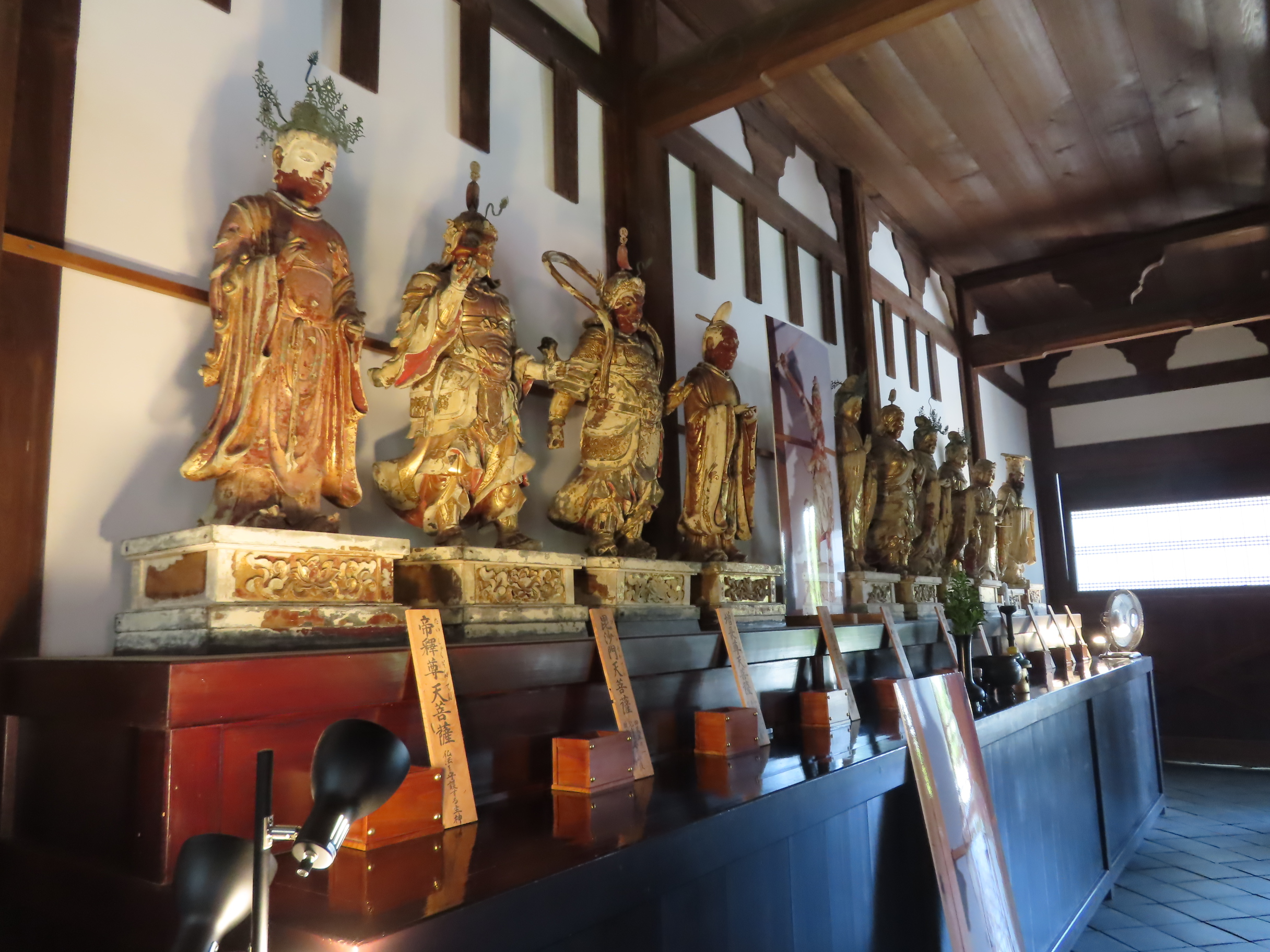
Statues on the left side of the hall

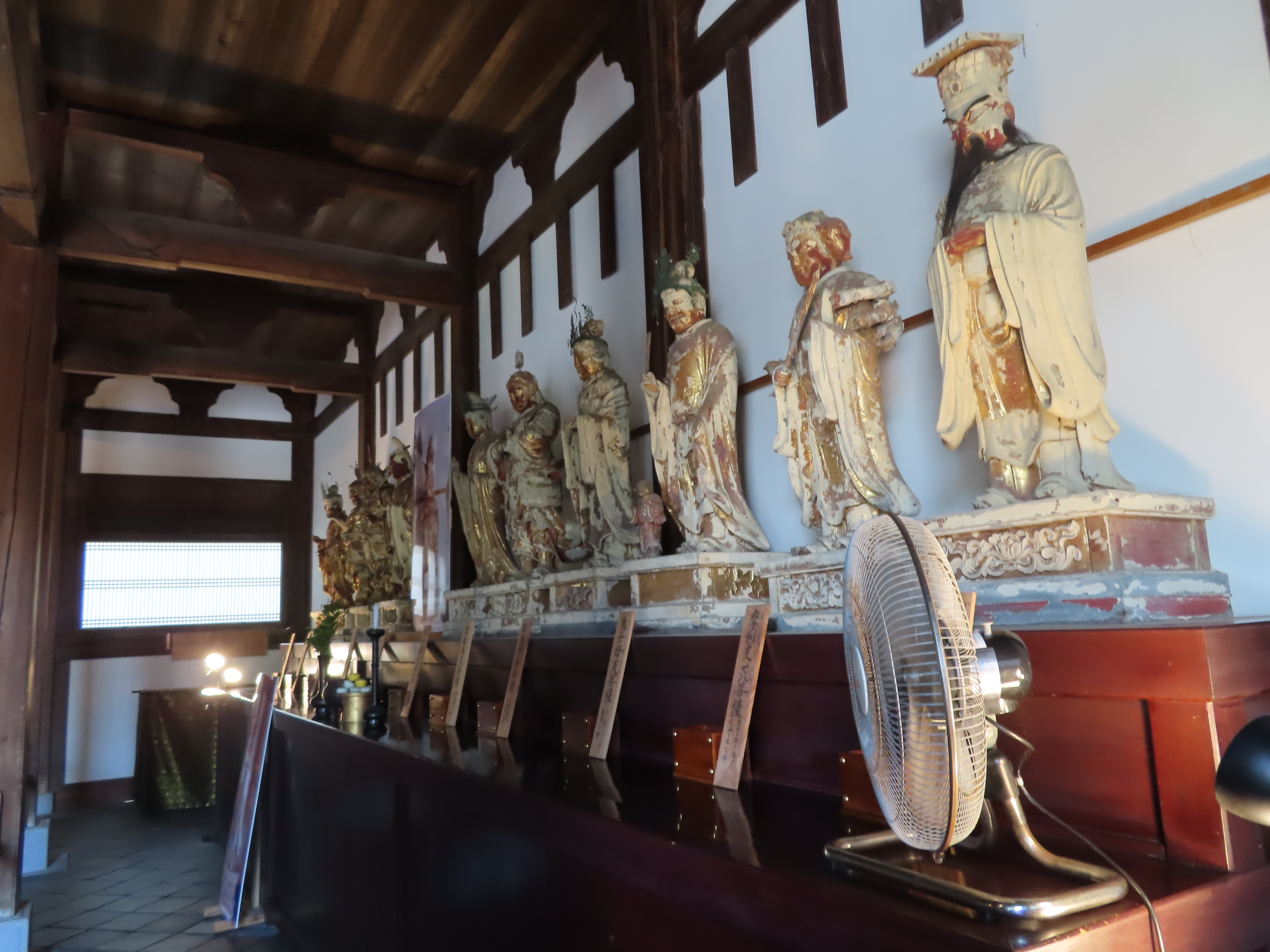
Statues on the right side of the hall
