= Eight Great Yakṣa Generals =

Guardian deities in Buddhism

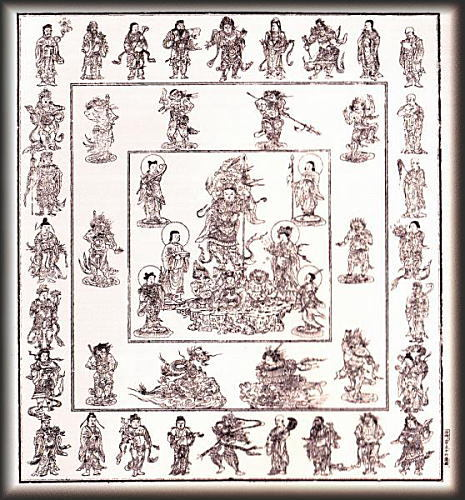
Sōryū Tamura's "Bishamonten Mandala". Vaiśravaṇa flanked by the Eight Yakṣa Generals and Nāga Kings.

The Eight Great Yakṣa Generals (Chinese: 八大夜叉大将; pinyin: Bādà Yèchā Dàjiàng), or simply the Eight Yakṣa Generals, are guardian deities in Buddhism. They are retainers of Vaiśravaṇa, guardian of the north and king of the yakṣas.

In East Asia, they are also variously known as the Eight Great Yakṣas (八大藥叉), the Eight Great Heavenly Kings (八大天王), and the Eight Brothers of Vaiśravaṇa (毘沙門八兄弟).

== Relationship to Vaiśravaṇa ==
The term yakṣarākṣasa has been used as a general term to denote the many classes of spirits in Indian mythology, combining the words yakṣa and rākṣasa.

According to Buddhist mythology, Vaiśravaṇa is the chief of these beings, and long ago dwelt together with them in the realm of darkness. When Vaiśravaṇa converted to Buddhism, the many demonic spirits under his jurisdiction likewise assumed the role of devotees to the Buddha. Originally malevolent beings, their conversion led to their deification as benevolent guardian deities.

Among the many yakṣas under Vaiśravaṇa's rule, the Eight Great Yakṣa Generals are ranked at the top of the hierarchy. Always at Vaiśravaṇa's command, these deities command 36,000 yakṣas that serve their king and are said to protect those who venerate them. A similar list may be found among the Twenty-Eight Great Yakṣa Generals.

== Yakṣa Generals ==
Their names are given in the Commentary on the Mahāvairocana Abhisaṃbodhi Tantra (大毘盧遮那成佛經疏) as follows:

| Sanskrit | Hanzi | Pinyin | Rōmaji | Vietnamese | Korean | Tagalog |
|---|---|---|---|---|---|---|
| Maṇibhadra | 寶賢 | Bǎoxián | Hōken | Bảo Hiền | 보현 | Manibhadla |
| Pūrṇabhadra | 滿賢 | Mǎnxián | Manken | Mãn Hiền | 만현 | Pulnabhadla |
| Pañcika | 散脂 | Sànzhī | Sanshi | Mật Chủ; Mật Thân | 산지 | Pankika |
| Śatagiri | 眾德 | Zhòngdé | Shūtoku | Uy Thần; Chúng Đức | 중덕 | Satagili |
| Haimavata | 應念 | Yīngniàn | Ōnen | Chủ Tuyết Sơn Giả; Ứng Niệm | 응념 | Haimabata |
| Viśākhā | 大滿 | Dàmǎn | Daiman | Đại Mãn; Trì Pháp | 대만 | Bisakha |
| Āṭavaka | 無比力 | Wúbǐlì | Muhiriki | Vô Tỉ Lực; Vô Tỉ Thân | 무비력 | Atabaka |
| Pañcala | 密嚴 | Mìyán | Mitsugon | Mật Nghiêm | 밀엄 | Pankala |

== See also ==
- Twelve Heavenly Generals
