= Puti Shushen =

Deity who guards the Bodhi Tree in Buddhism

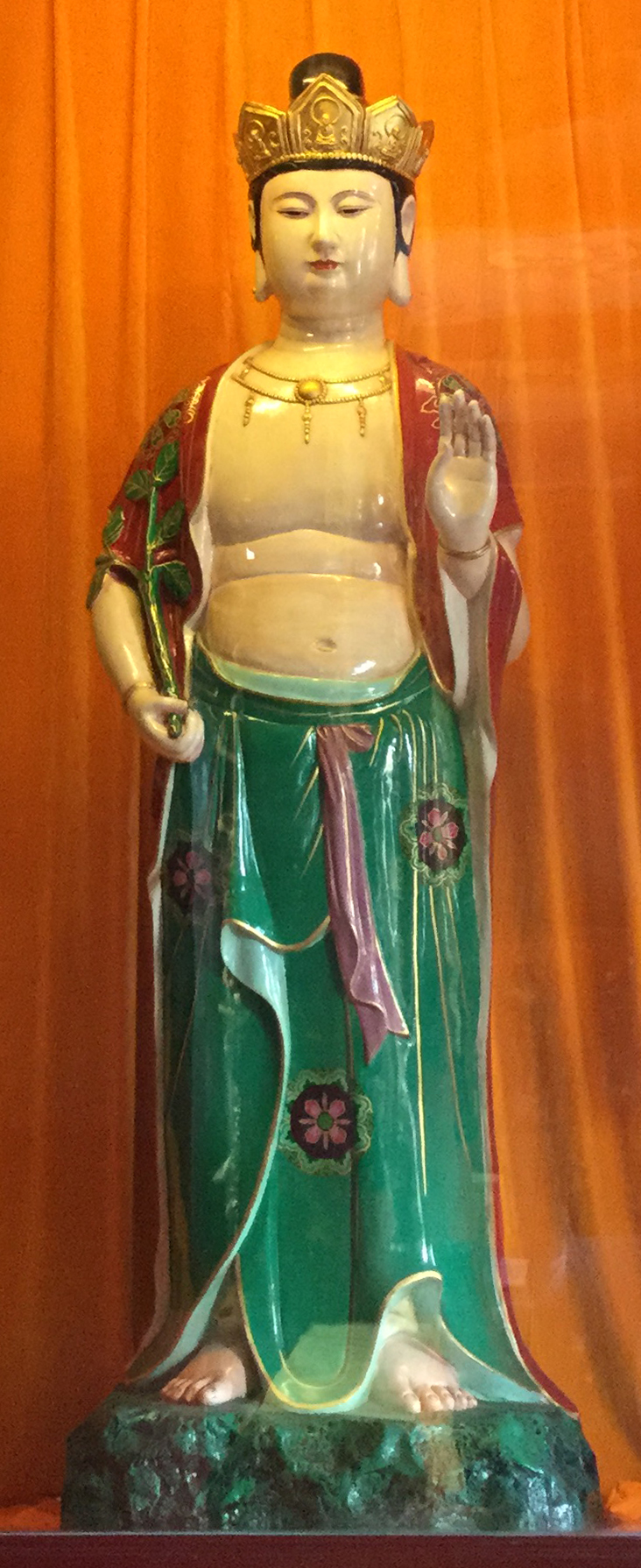
Puti Shushen statue

Puti Shushen (Chinese: 菩提树神; lit. 'The Bodhi Tree Deity') is a protective deity in Buddhist tradition and mythology. The Bodhi Tree (菩提树, Ficus religiosa) holds immense spiritual significance in Buddhism as the tree under which Siddhartha Gautama, attained enlightenment. Puti Shushen is the deity or spirit believed to reside in or protect the Bodhi tree.

== Iconography ==
In Chinese Buddhist temples, the Bodhi Tree Deity is typically depicted as a youthful woman holding a leafy branch, symbolizing the Bodhi tree. This representation underscores her role as the tree's protector and her association with enlightenment.

== Origin and legend ==
The term "Bodhi" translates to "enlightenment" or "awakening". According to Buddhist tradition, while meditating under the Bodhi tree, the Buddha achieved profound insight into the nature of existence. The tree thus became a symbol of enlightenment. Over time, the concept of a guardian spirit or deity associated with the Bodhi tree emerged. In some Buddhist texts, the Bodhi Tree Deity is described as a witness to the Buddha's enlightenment, offering protection and support during his meditation.

In Buddhist cosmology, deities and spirits often inhabit natural elements, and the Bodhi Tree Deity is one such entity associated with a site of profound spiritual importance. The veneration of the Bodhi tree and its guardian deity underscores the deep reverence for the enlightenment experience in Buddhist practice. Devotees often engage in rituals such as offering incense and flowers, circumambulating the tree, and performing prostrations, symbolizing respect and aspiration for spiritual awakening.

The original Mahabodhi tree at the Mahabodhi Temple in Bodh Gaya, India, is one of the most sacred sites in Buddhism. It is believed that the Bodhi Tree Deity has protected this tree for centuries. Over time, as Buddhism spread across Asia, the concept of the Bodhi Tree Deity was incorporated into local traditions and folklore, often blending with indigenous beliefs about tree spirits and nature deities.

In Chinese Buddhism, the guardian of the Bodhi tree is called Puti Shushen. She is regarded as one of the Sixteen Devas (十六諸天 Shíliù Zhūtiān), the Twenty Devas (二十諸天 Èrshí Zhūtiān) and the Twenty-Four Devas (二十四諸天 Èrshísì zhūtiān). As a member of the Twenty-Four Devas, the Bodhi Tree Deity serves as a Dharma protector, safeguarding the teachings of Buddhism and the monastic community. Her presence in temples serves as a reminder of the Buddha's enlightenment and the sanctity of the Bodhi tree.
