= Pañcika =

Sanzhi Dajiang
- Member of Twenty Devas, Twenty-four Devas
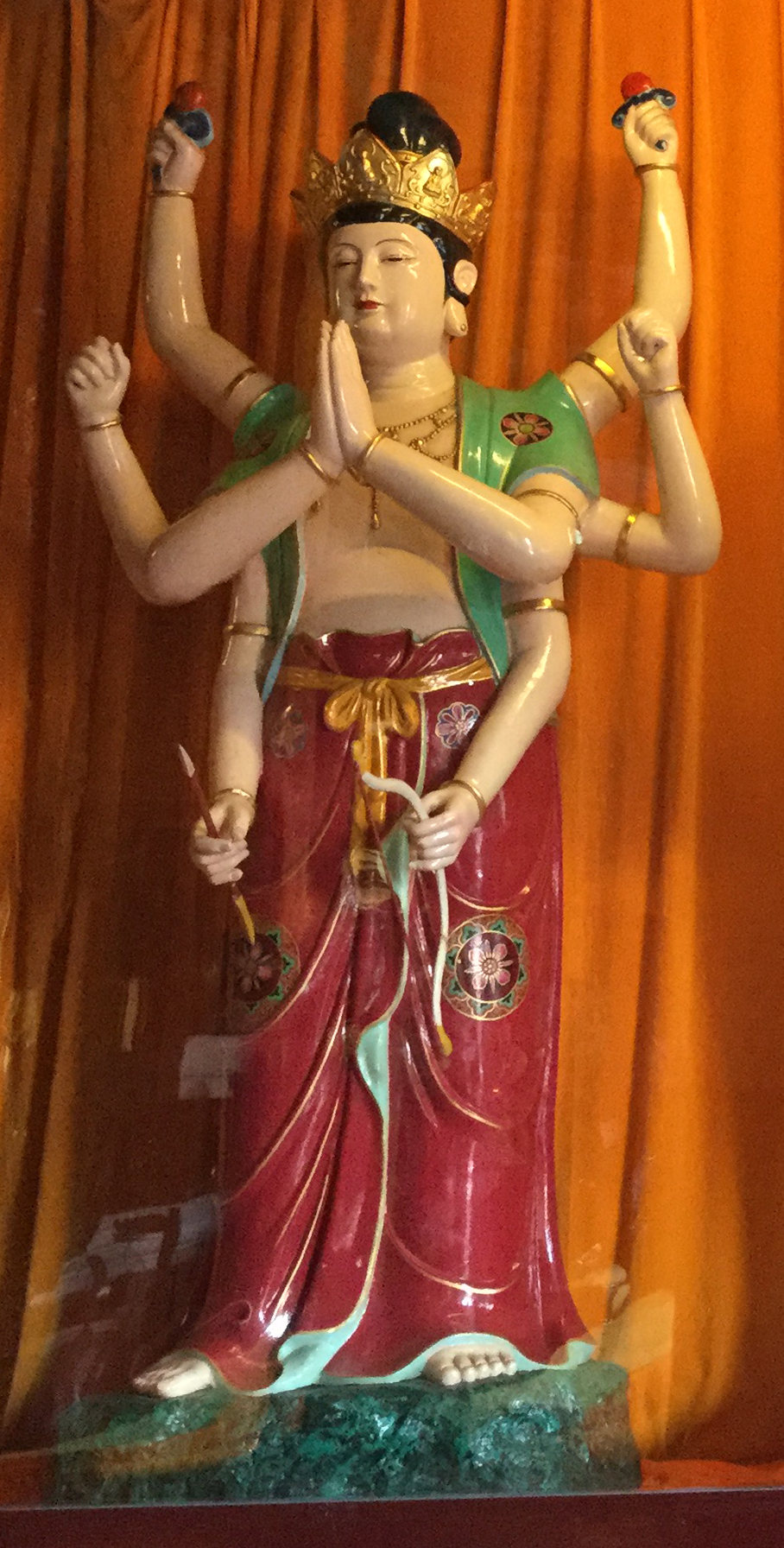
- Shantou Temple of Heaven Garden Statue of Sanzhi Dajiang
- Other names: Pandaka, Sanzhijia, Banzhijia, Panjaga, Sanzhi Yaksha, Sanzhi Yaksha, Banzhijia Yaksha King
- Devanagari: पञ्चिक
- Sanskrit transliteration: Pāñcika
- Consort: Hārītī

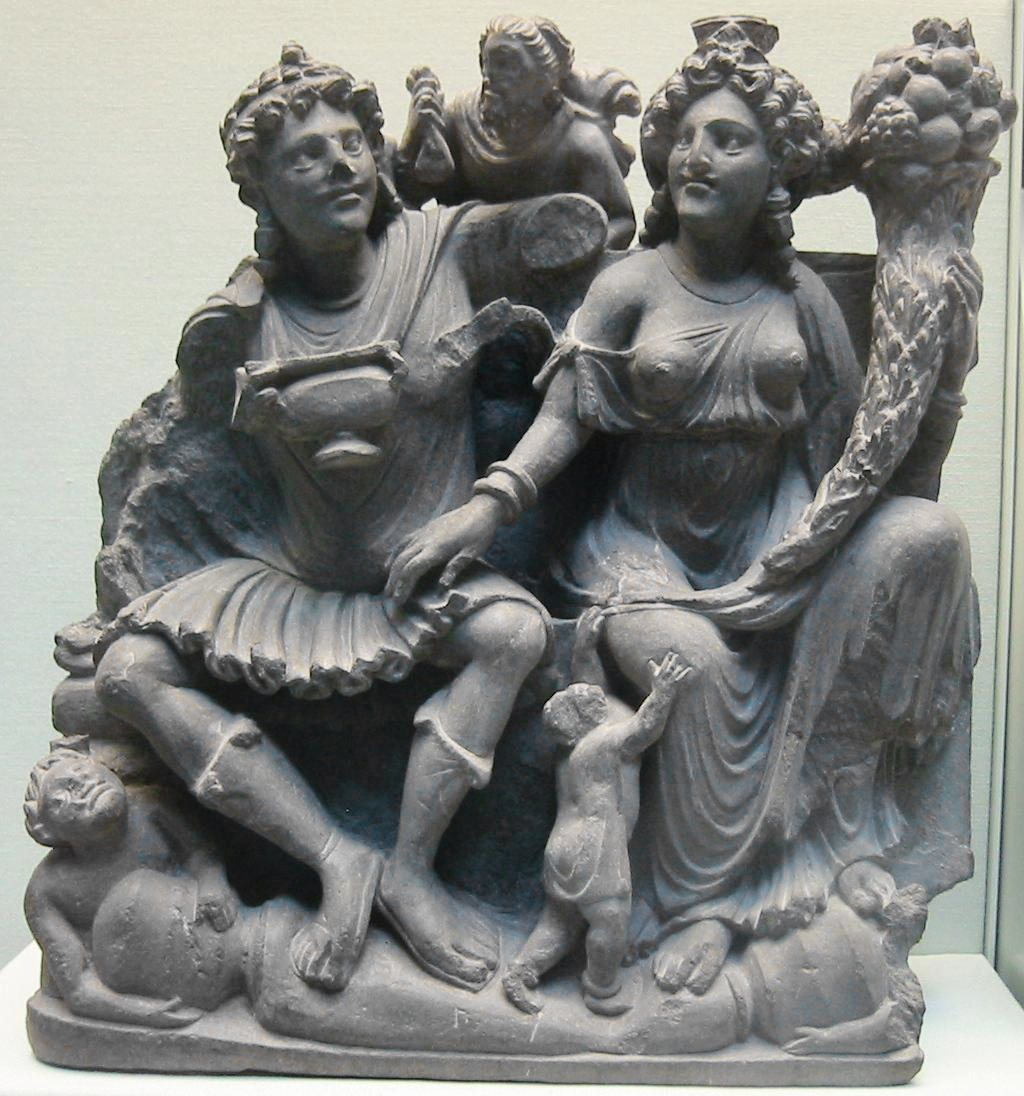
Pañcika and Hariti

Pañcika (Chinese: 般闍迦 [Pánshéjiā]/散脂大將 [Sànzhī Dàjiàng]/散脂迦 [Sànzhījiā]/半支迦 [Bànzhījiā]/般闍迦 [Pánshéjiā], Pāli: Pandaka) is a yaksha and the husband of Hārītī, with whom he is said to have fathered 500 children.

According to the Mahavamsa, Pañcika was the commander-in-chief of the yakṣa army of Vaiśravaṇa and had another 27 yakṣa generals under his orders. According to legend, He and his wife became devout followers of Buddhism after Majjhantika started preaching in the region of Gandhara.

Pañcika was often represented holding a lance and a bag of jewels or money together with Hariti in the Greco-Buddhist art of Gandhara, where they illustrated marital love following the intervention of the Buddha. The two figures "were very popular in Gandhara in the latter part of the second century, and their statues are many." When depicted holding a spear, he also signals his role as the chief of the Yakṣas. The iconography of Pancika was eventually merged with that of Vaiśravaṇa.

== See also ==
- Manibhadra
- Vaiśravaṇa
