= Brahmā (Buddhism) =

Deities from the non-sensual realm in Buddhism

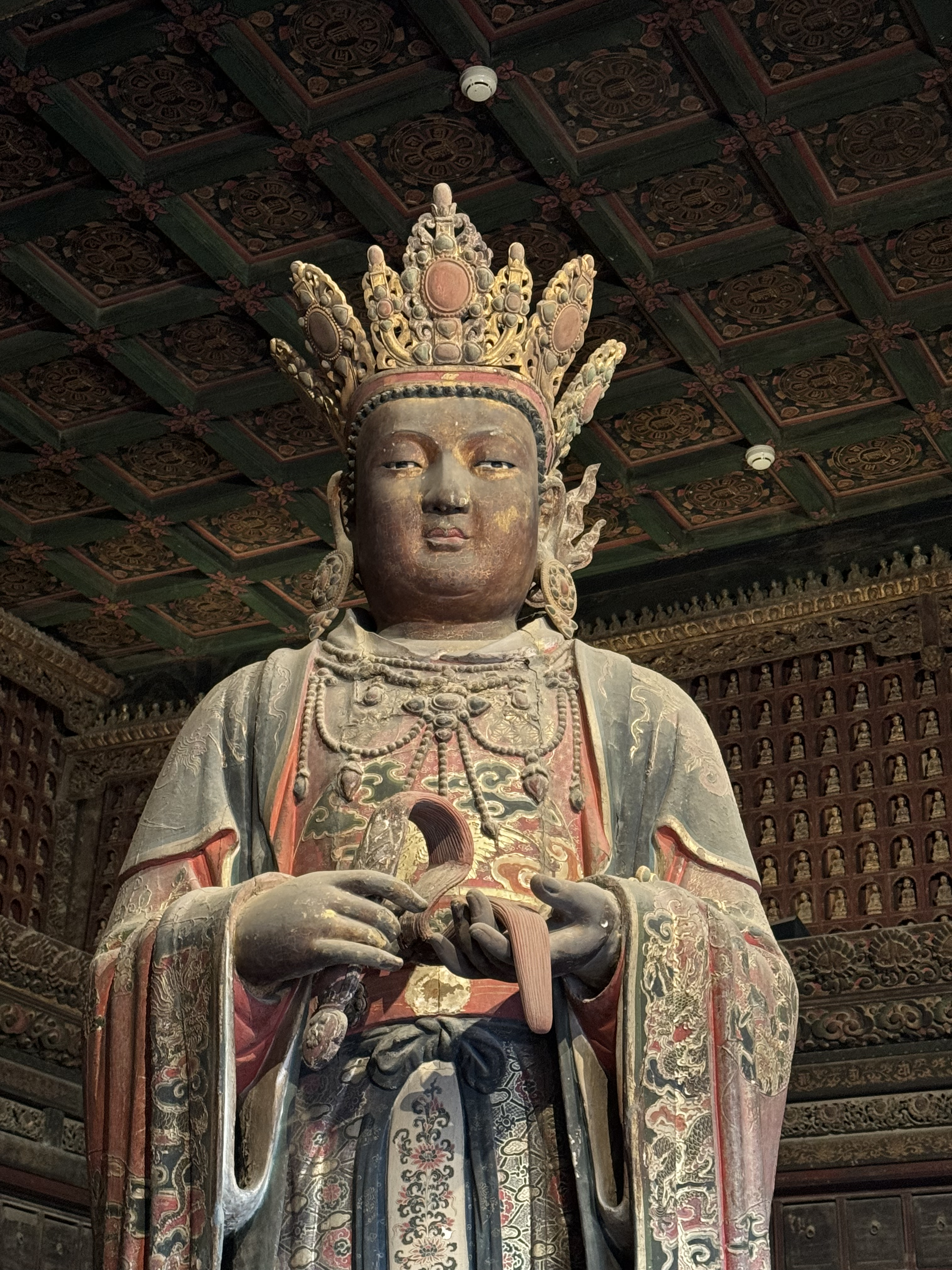
- Ming dynasty statue of Brahma (Pinyin: Fàntiān) in Zhihua Temple in Beijing, China
- Sanskrit: ब्रह्मा Brahmā
- Pāli: ब्रह्मा Brahmā
- Burmese: ဗြဟ္မာ (Brahma)
- Chinese: 梵天 (Pinyin: Fàntiān)
- Japanese: 梵天(ぼんてん) (Romaji: Bonten)
- Khmer: ព្រះព្រហ្ម (Preah Prom)
- Korean: 범천 (RR: Beom Cheon)
- Mongolian: Эсруа / Эсрүн тэнгэр
- Sinhala: බ්‍රහ්මයා Brahmayā
- Tagalog: Blahma
- Thai: พระพรหม; Phra Phrom
- Tibetan: ཚངས་པ་ Wylie: tshangs pa THL: tsangpa
- Vietnamese: Phạm Thiên (chữ Nho: 梵天)

Information
- Venerated by: Theravāda, Mahāyāna, Vajrayāna

In Buddhist literature a Brahmā (deity or god), refers to a being of the non-sensual world (Brahmaloka), one of the highest realms in Buddhist cosmology. They live in groups often under their chief referred to as Mahābrahmā (The Great God). The texts mention encounters with Mahābrahmā several times and it is not clear if they refer to the same Mahābrahmā or different Mahābrahmās each abiding in their own world.

Mahābrahmā is also considered as a protector of teachings (dharmapala), and he is never depicted in early Buddhist texts as a creator god, as is the Brahma of Hinduism. In Buddhist tradition, it was the deity Brahma Sahampati who appeared before the Buddha and invited him to teach, once the Buddha attained enlightenment.

== Origins and nomenclature ==
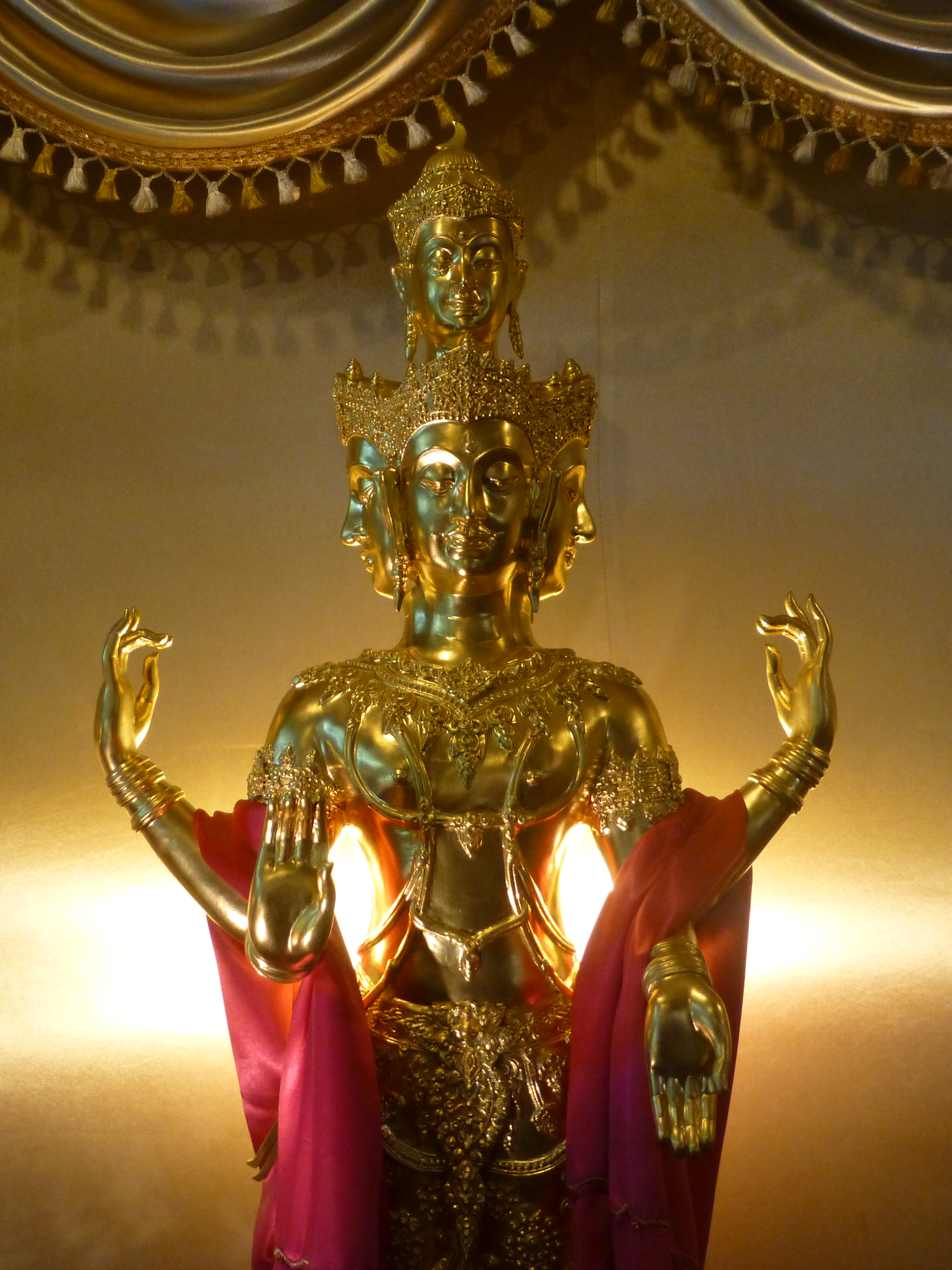
Brahmā (Phra Phrom) at Wat Yannawa in Bangkok, Thailand

The origins of Brahma in Buddhism and other Indian religions are uncertain, in part because several related words such as one for metaphysical Ultimate Reality (Brahman), and priest (Brahmin) are found in the Vedic literature. According to KN Jayatilleke, the Rigveda expresses skepticism about major deities such as Indra; whether he even exists, as well as whether the universe has any creator and whether this can ever be known, as evidenced in its eighth and tenth book, particularly in its Nasadiya Sukta.

The late Vedic hymns had begun inquiring the nature of true and valid knowledge, empirical verification and absolute reality. The early Upanishads built upon this theme, while in parallel there emerged Buddhism, Jainism and other skeptical traditions. Buddhism used the term Brahma to deny a creator as well as to delegate him (and other deities such as Indra) as less important than the Buddha.

In Hindu literature, one of the earliest mention of deity Brahma with Vishnu and Shiva is in the fifth Prapathaka (lesson) of the Maitrayaniya Upanishad, probably composed in late 1st millennium BCE, after the rise of Buddhism. The spiritual concept of Brahman is far older, and some scholars suggest deity Brahma may have emerged as a personal conception and icon with attributes (saguna version) of the impersonal universal principle called Brahman. The Buddhists attacked the concept of Brahma, states Gananath Obeyesekere, and thereby polemically attacked the Vedic and Upanishadic concept of gender neutral, abstract metaphysical Brahman. This critique of Brahma in early Buddhist texts aim at ridiculing the Vedas, but the same texts simultaneously call metta (loving-kindness, compassion) as the state of union with Brahma. The early Buddhist approach to Brahma was to reject any creator aspect, while retaining the Brahmavihara aspects of Brahma, in the Buddhist value system. Deity Brahma is also found in the samsara doctrine and cosmology of early Buddhism.

Brahma is known as Fantian (梵天) in Chinese, Bonten (梵天) in Japanese, Hoān-thian (梵天) in Taiwanese language, Pomch'on in Korean, Phạm Thiên in Vietnamese, Phra Phrom in Thai, and Tshangs pa in Tibetan.

== Classification ==
The term Brahmā in Buddhism refers to the leading god, but in some Suttas the term broadly refers to all deities who live in the realm of form. Ancient and medieval Buddhist texts define seventeen, or more, heavenly Brahmā realms (along with demi-gods, hungry ghost and hellish realms), in a stratified manner, which are reached in afterlife based on monastic achievement and karma accumulation. A brahma in these texts refers to any deva in the heavenly realms. The Buddhist god Brahmā himself resides in the highest of the seventeen realms, called the Akaniṣṭha. The multitude of Buddhist brahmas can refer to:

1. Any of the deities of the formless realm of existence called Ārūpyadhātu brahma, who enjoy the highest heavenly pleasures in afterlife;
2. Any of the deities of the anthropomorphic form realm of existence called Rūpadhātu brahma, who enjoy moderate heavenly pleasures;

In the Niddesa, the Buddha is devatideva, the god beyond the gods including Brahma.

In Thailand, Brahma or Phra Phrom is typically seen as the Buddhist god of order, government, law, students, the police, education, and the physical world. He also has a role of both making the universe from chaotic, primordial matter and states of existence, and afterwards continually maintaining it by mitigating the depredations of these forces, with his efforts both being helped and hindered by the order and chaos of humanity and its civilizations. Although, in modern and historic Thai religious writings, depictions that resemble the Hindu Brahma much more existed.

=== Brahmā Ghaṭīkāra ===
Brahmā Ghaṭīkāra (literally "potter-Brahmā") is the deity that provided Siddhartha Gautama with the eight requisites of a monk upon his entering into the homeless life. In a past human life, he was a potter named Ghaṭīkāra Bhaggava and was a devout lay disciple of Kāśyapa Buddha, as well as a close friend of Jotipāla, a past life of Gautama Buddha.

=== Brahmā Baka ===
Brahmā Baka (literally "crane-Brahmā") appears in the Majjhima Nikaya, where he is a deity who believes that his world is permanent and without decay (and that therefore he is immortal), and that therefore there are no higher worlds than his.

=== Brahmā Sahāmpati ===
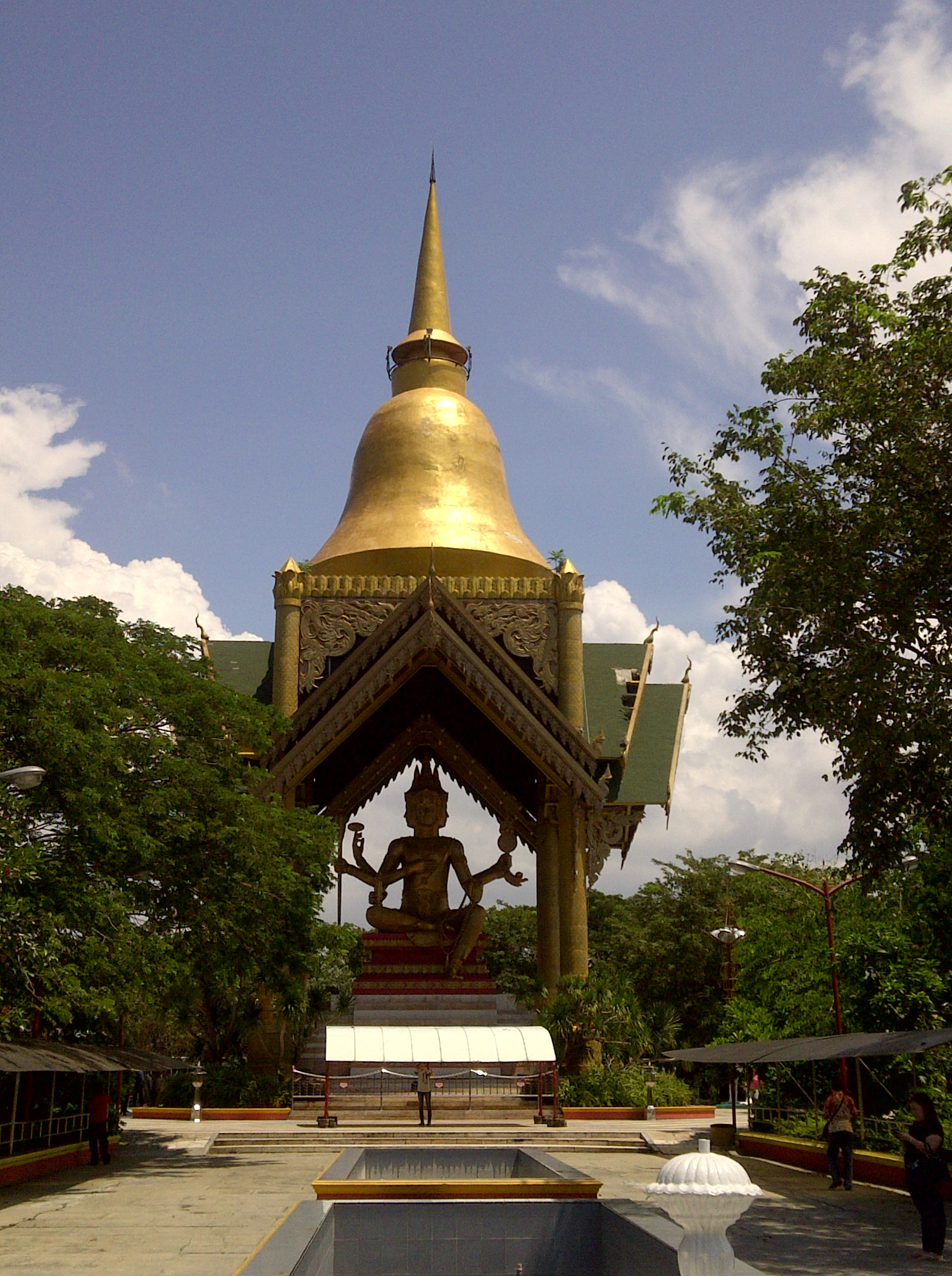
Gold covered Phra Phrom statue at Sanggar Agung, Surabaya, Indonesia. He is known as Brahmā Sahāmpati in the Thai tradition.

Brahmā Sahāmpati, said to be the most senior of the Mahābrahmās, was the deity who visited the Buddha when he attained enlightenment, and encouraged him to teach the Dharma to humans.

=== Brahmā Sanatkumāra ===
Brahmā Sanatkumāra (Sanskrit) or Brahmā Sanaṅkumāra (Pāli), the "Ever-young", appears in the Janavasabha-sutta (DN.18), where he is recalled as having created an illusionary presence to make himself perceptible to the coarser senses of Śakra and the gods of Trāyastriṃśa.

=== Mahābrahmā ===
The singular leading deity and the king of heavens Brahmā is sometimes referred in Buddhist texts as Mahābrahmā. However, the Suttas are inconsistent in this regard and several early Buddhist texts depict Sakra (Pāli: Sakka) – who is same as the Hindu Vedic god Indra – as more important than Mahabrahma.

The Mahābrahmā, or the Great Brahma, states Peter Harvey, is mentioned in Digha Nikaya as the being who dwells in the upper heaven; a Buddhist student can join him for one kalpa (eon, Brahma-year in Indian religions) after successfully entering the first jhana in the form realm of Buddhist practice.

=== Subrahmā and Suddhāvāsa ===
A pair of Brahmās who are usually seen together while engaging in conversation with the Buddha.

== Brahmavihara ==
In the sense of "a being of the Rūpadhātu", the term Brahmā may be related to Brahmavihāra, a term referring to the meditative states achieved through the four Rūpajhānas, which are shared by the inhabitants of the Rūpadhātu. Prior to the advent of the Buddha, according to Martin Wiltshire, the pre-Buddhist traditions of Brahma-loka, meditation and these four virtues are evidenced in both early Buddhist and non-Buddhist literature. The early Buddhist texts assert that pre-Buddha ancient Indian sages who taught these virtues were earlier incarnations of the Buddha. Post-Buddha, these same virtues are found in the Hindu texts such as verse 1.33 of the Yoga Sutras of Patañjali. According to Peter Harvey, the Buddhist scriptures acknowledge that the four Brahmavihara meditation practices "did not originate within the Buddhist tradition". The Buddha never claimed that the "four immeasurables" were his unique ideas, in a manner similar to "cessation, quieting, nirvana". These meditation practices are named after Brahma, a god also found in Hinduism texts as well as Jainism text wherein he is equated with Rishabhanatha – the first Tirthankara in Jaina tradition.

== Chronology and Non-Buddhist views ==
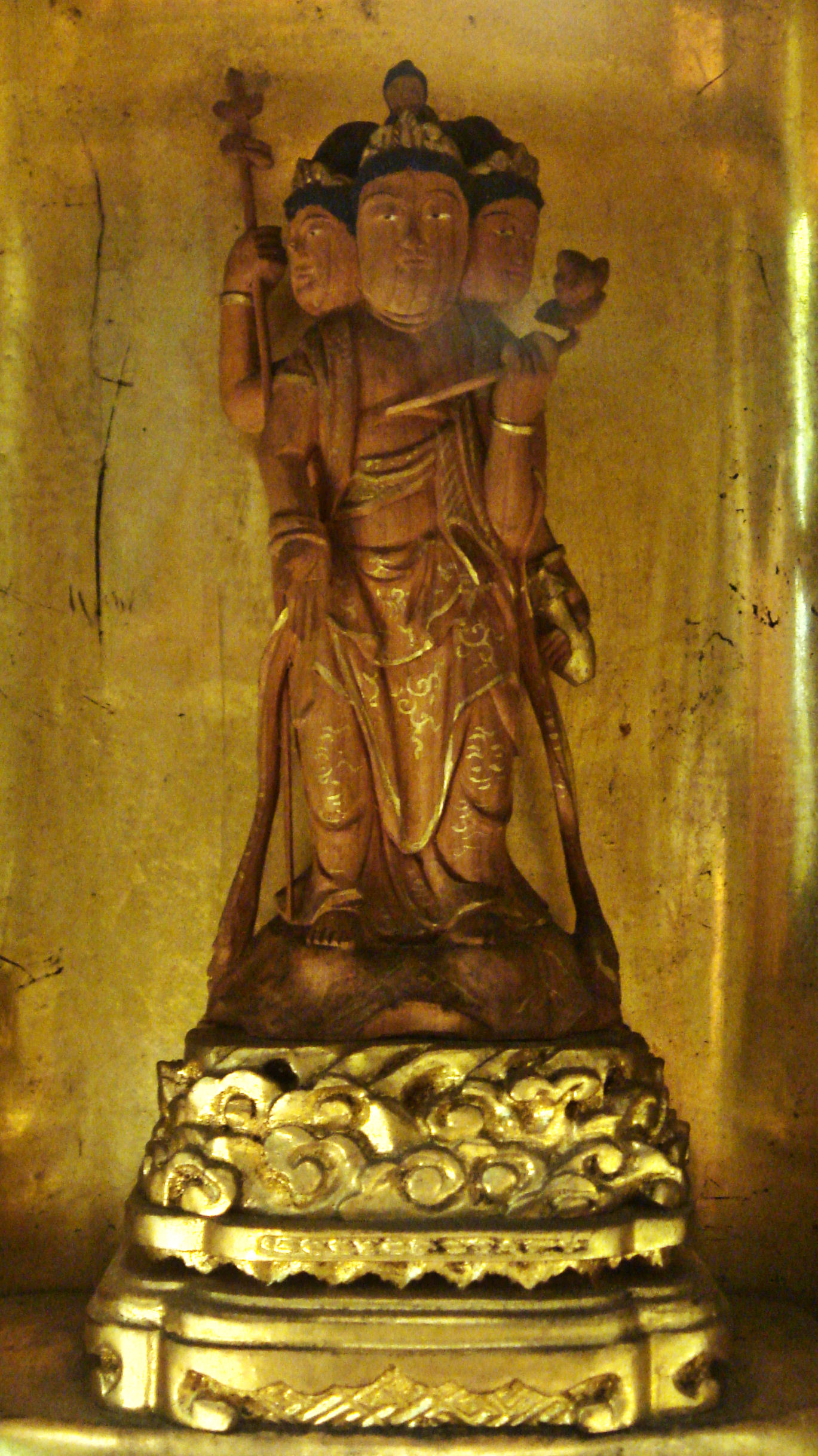
Japanese statue of Brahma

The old Upanishads mention both Brahma in the masculine gender deity "Brahmā", as well as gender neutral "Brahman" as the impersonal world principle.

According to David Kalupahana, the Upanishads do not strictly distinguish between the two. In contrast, Damien Keown and Charles Prebish state the texts do distinctly present both the male deity Brahma and the abstract Brahman, however, in the Upanishads, deity Brahma is only referred to a few times. The Brahman as the eternal, absolute metaphysical reality – along with Atman (self, soul) – is the predominant and frequent teaching in the Upanishads and other Vedic literature of the Upanishadic period, so much so that early Hinduism is also referred to as Brahmanism. The Pāli scriptures, which were written centuries after the death of the Buddha (although understood as representing the memorized word of the Buddha), mention Brahma, but there is no unambiguous mention of the gender neuter Brahman concept.

Buddhism denies both Brahman and Atman concepts in ancient Hindu literature, and posits Śūnyatā (emptiness, voidness) and Anatta (non-Self, no soul) concept instead.

The word Brahma is normally used in Buddhist sutras to mean "best", or "supreme". Brahman in the texts of Advaita Vedanta and many other Hindu schools, states Nakamura, is a concrete universal, manifesting itself as phenomenal reality which is not illusory and nondual.

In the earliest Upanishad, the Brihadaranyaka Upanishad, the Absolute, which came to be referred to as Brahman, is referred to as "the imperishable". The Pāli scriptures present a "pernicious view" that is set up as an absolute principle corresponding to Brahman: "O Bhikkhus! At that time Baka, the Brahmā, produced the following pernicious view: 'It is permanent. It is eternal. It is always existent. It is independent existence. It has the dharma of non-perishing. Truly it is not born, does not become old, does not die, does not disappear, and is not born again. Furthermore, no liberation superior to it exists elsewhere." The principle expounded here corresponds to the concept of Brahman laid out in the Upanishads. According to this text the Buddha criticized this notion: "Truly the Baka Brahmā is covered with unwisdom."

The Buddha confined himself to both ordinary empirical sense experience and extrasensory perception enabled by high degrees of mental concentration. The Upanishadic scholars, according to Francis X Clooney and other scholars, assert their insights as a combination of intuitive empiricism, experimentalism, and inspired creative perception.

Muhammad meets the angel with seventy heads. Miraj Name, Herat, Afghanistan, 1436-1437.

Rashid ad-Din's translations of Buddhist beliefs to a Muslim audience draws parallels between Buddhist and Islamic conceptions of heaven and hell. As such, counterparts to figures such as the Devil (Māra - Iblīs), celestial maidens (Accharā - ḥūrīya), paradise (Svargaḥ - Jannah), Nirvāṇa - fanāʾ, and heavenly beings were sought. In a 15th century Herat painting, Muhammad is depicted as meeting an angel with seventy heads in the heavens. The angel is a possible Muslim iteration of a Brahmā from Tantric Buddhism, the Indian deities Vishnu, Shiva, and Indra in particular, as depictions of the boddhisatva Avalokiteśvara.

== See also ==
- Brahma, the creator deity of Hinduism
- Brahma from Mirpur-Khas
- Mahabrahma
- Phra Phrom
