= Mahabrahma =

Figure in Buddhist mythology

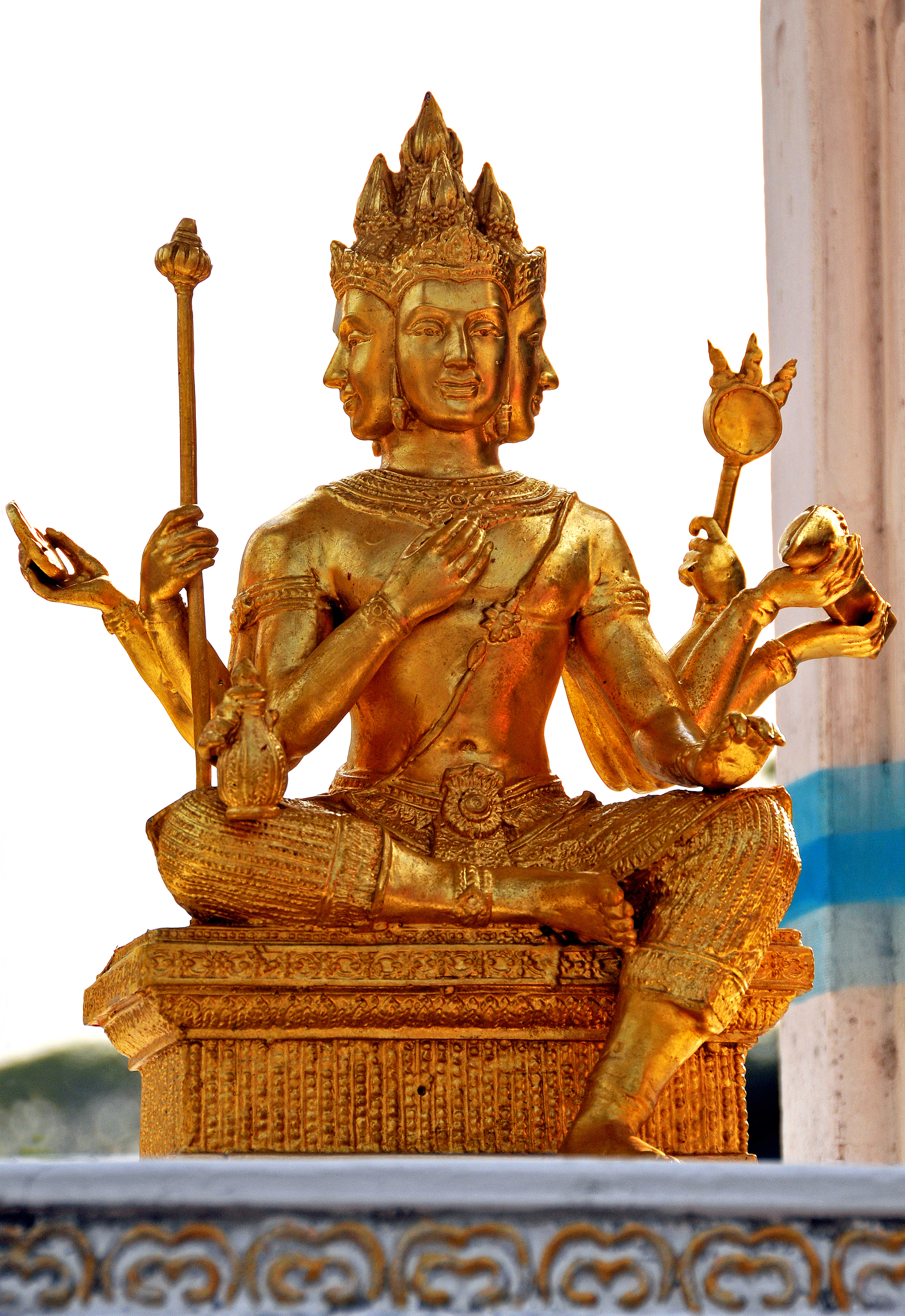
Mahabrahma at Wat Yannawa

Mahābrahmā (Tibetan: tshangs pa chen po; Chinese/Japanese: 大梵天 Daibonten; Sinhala: මහා බ්‍රහ්ම; Thai: มหาพรหฺมฺา), sometimes only called Brahma, is the ruler of the Brahma World (Brahmaloka) in the Buddhist cosmology. He is considered the protector of Buddhist teachings (Pali: Dhammapala; Sanskrit: Dharmapala). Mahabrahma is a great brahmin and the upper class and holy brahmin, generally represented in Buddhist culture as a god with four faces and four arms like other Brahmas, and variants of him are found in different Buddhist cultures. The Mahābrahmā, or the Great Brahma, is mentioned in Digha Nikaya as the being who dwells in the upper heaven; a Buddhist student can join him for one kalpa (eon, Brahma-year in Buddhism) after successfully entering the first jhana in the form realm of Buddhist practice.

In many Buddhist Suttas/Sutras, Mahabrahma pays visit to the Buddha. In the 13th-century version of Journey to the West, Sun Wukong's precursor flies Tang Sanzang and his retinue to heaven to meet Mahabrahma, where the monk impresses the devas with his lecture on the Lotus Sutra.

Mahabrahma with other notable brahmas are revered by Buddhists around the world. One can find statues of Mahabrahma in many Buddhist temples. Various temples like Erawan Shrine in Thailand are dedicated to Mahabrahma.

== Misconstrued as the Creator of the world ==
Buddhism is a religion that does not include the belief in a creator deity or any eternal divine personal being. Buddhism assumes that the universe has no ultimate beginning to it, and thus sees no need for a creator God. Buddhist texts posit that deities such as Mahabrahma are misconstrued as creators. During the Vivartakalpa, a deity from Abhassara plane was reborn in the Mahabrahma plane, as many living beings forget about their past life; this too happened with the Mahabrahma, and being unaware of the above planes of existence, he felt alone. He longed for the presence of others. After some time, many other deities from the above planes were also reborn in those Brahma planes, as his ministers and companions. Seeing this happen, he falsely believed himself to be their creator. This belief, states the Buddhist texts, was then shared by other deities. Eventually, however, one of the deities died and was reborn as a human. Through meditation, he got the power to remember his previous life. He went on to teach what he remembered from his previous life in the lower heaven, that Mahabrahma was the creator of the universe. This teaching led to the widespread human belief in a creator god, according to the Pali Canon.

== Cult of Phra Phrom ==
Mahabrahma is called Phra Phrom (Thai: พระพรหม; from Sanskrit/Pali: Brahmā, ब्रह्मा) in Thailand. In Thai culture, he is regarded as the deity of good fortune and protection. As early as the 1980s, the popularity of the Erawan cult of Phra Phrom from its inceptions in Thailand spread, accompanied by faithful reproduction of the structure of the shrine and the image, among overseas Buddhists in other countries of Southeast Asia (Singapore, Indonesia and Malaysia), in Taiwan, and in China. A statue of Phra Phrom can also be found on the ground of the Government House of Thailand.

== Gallery ==
An altar dedicated to Mahabrahma in Kaohsiung, Taiwan.

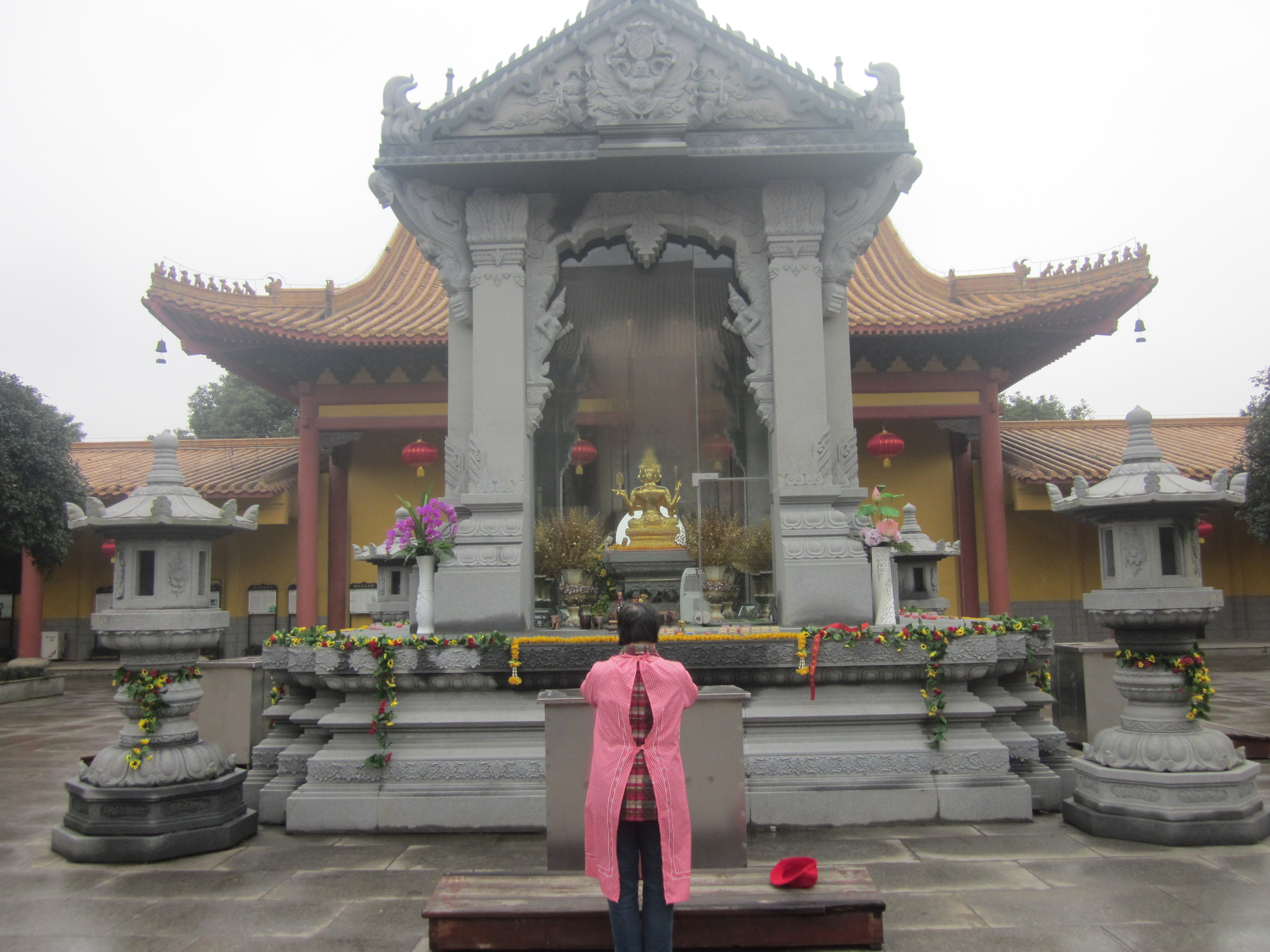
Mahabrahma shrine at Xixin Chan Temple in Hunan, China.

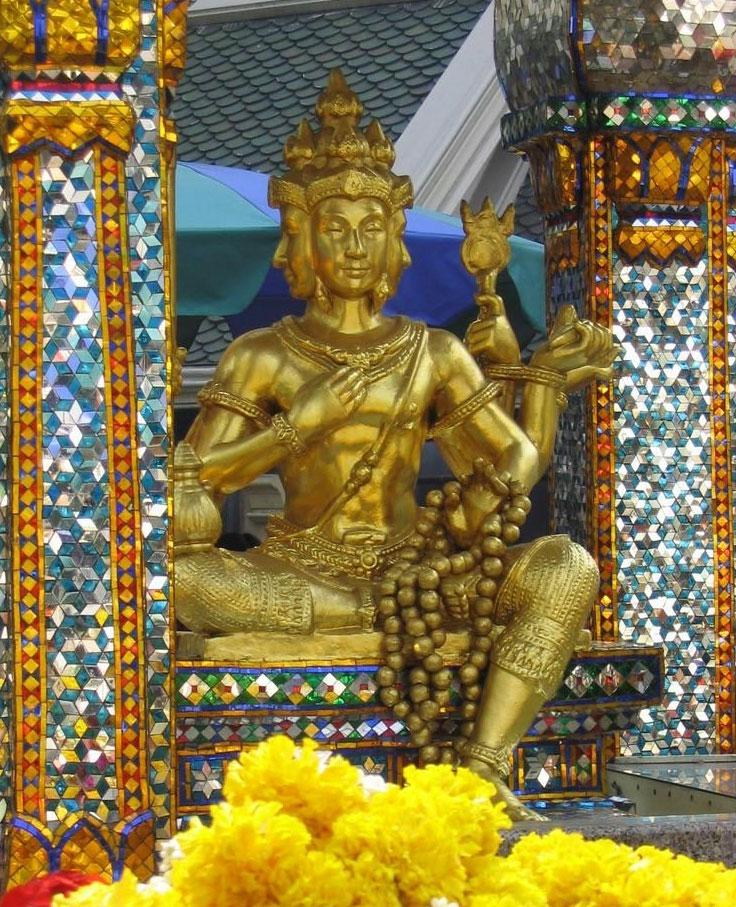
Mahabrahma statue at the Erawan Shrine, Bangkok

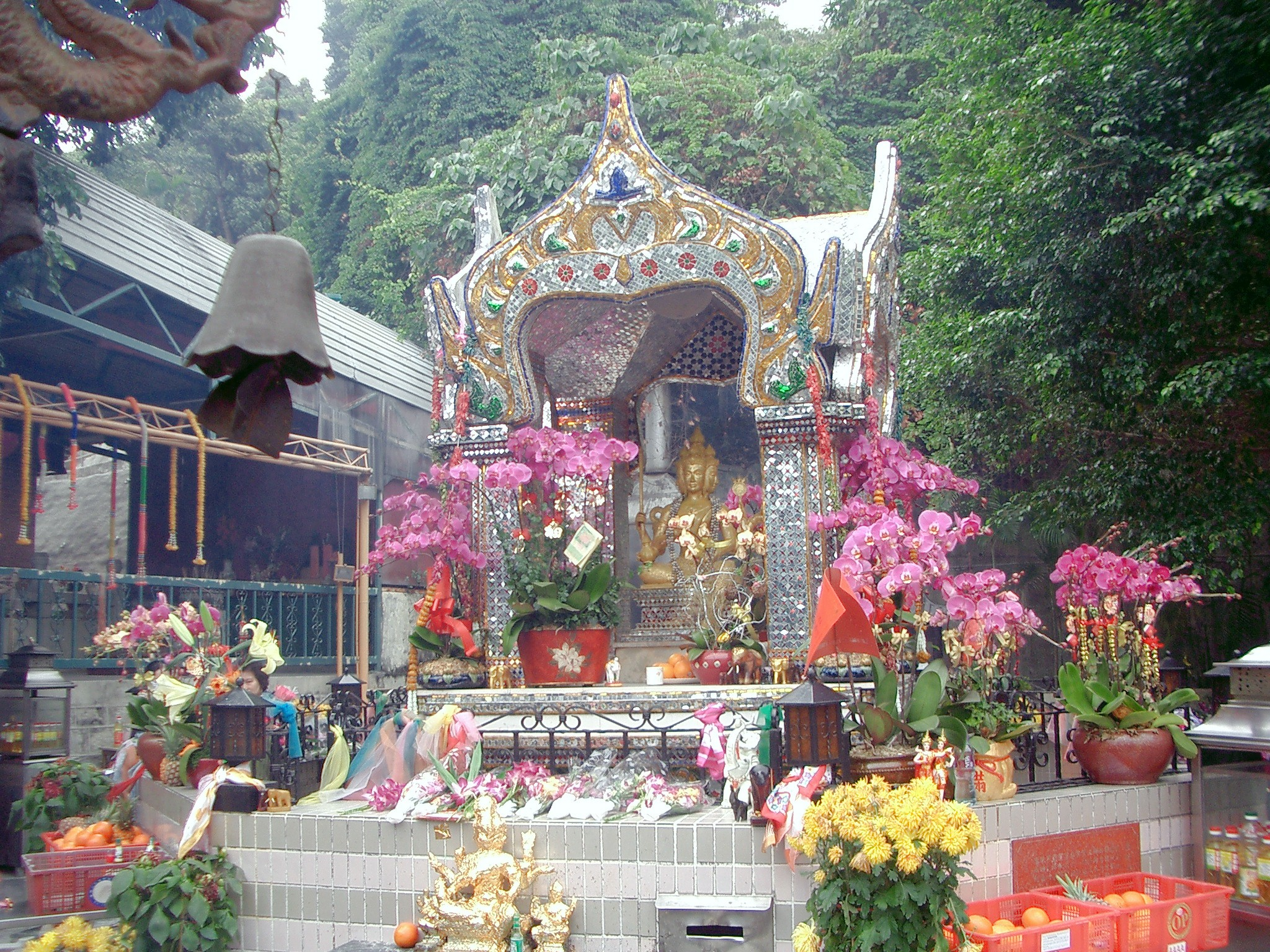
Mahabrahma statue of Koon Ngam Ching Yuen, Sha Tin, Hong Kong

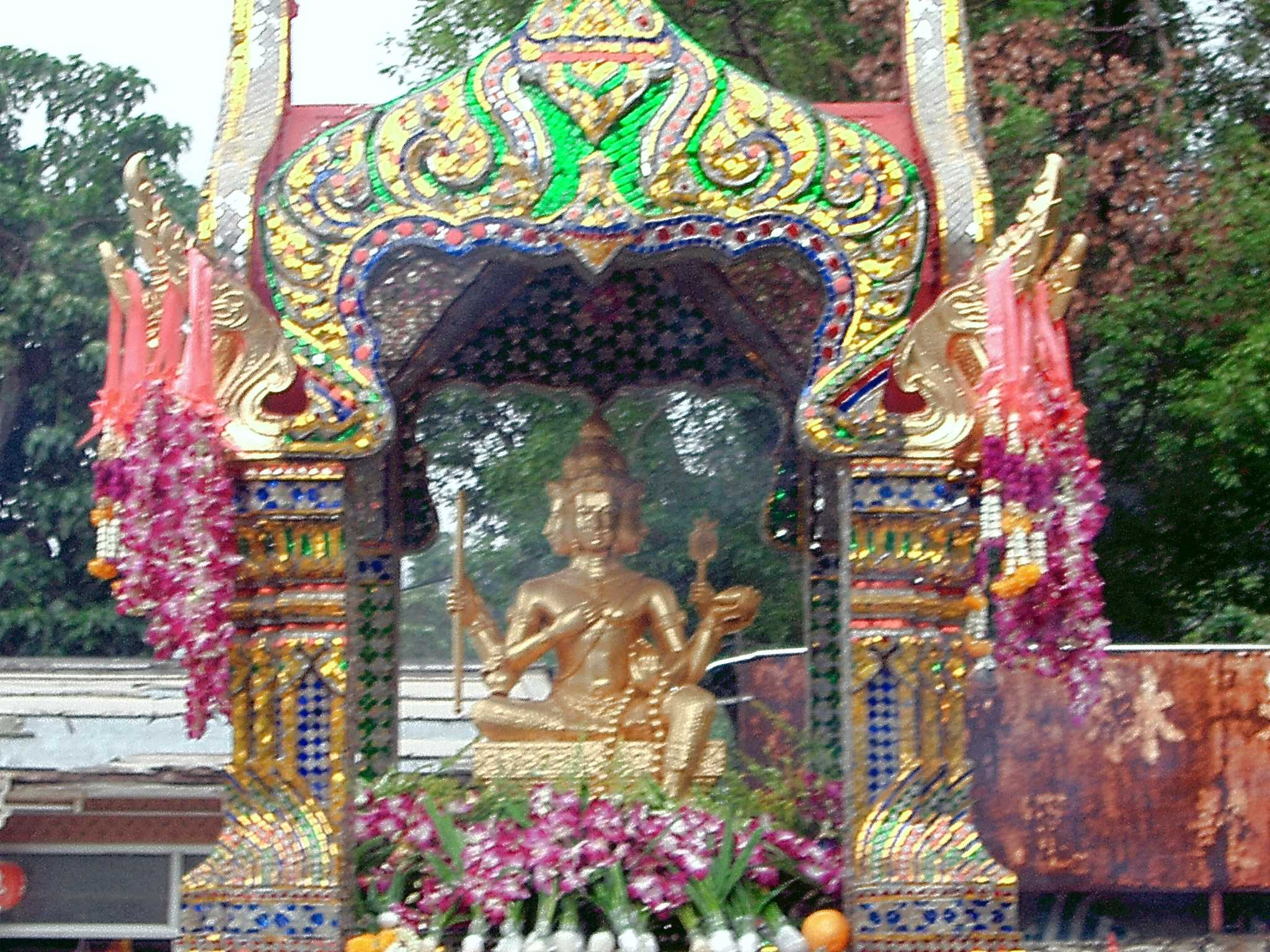
Mahabrahma statue of Chuk Lam Sim, Fu Yung Shan, Tsuen Wan, Hong Kong

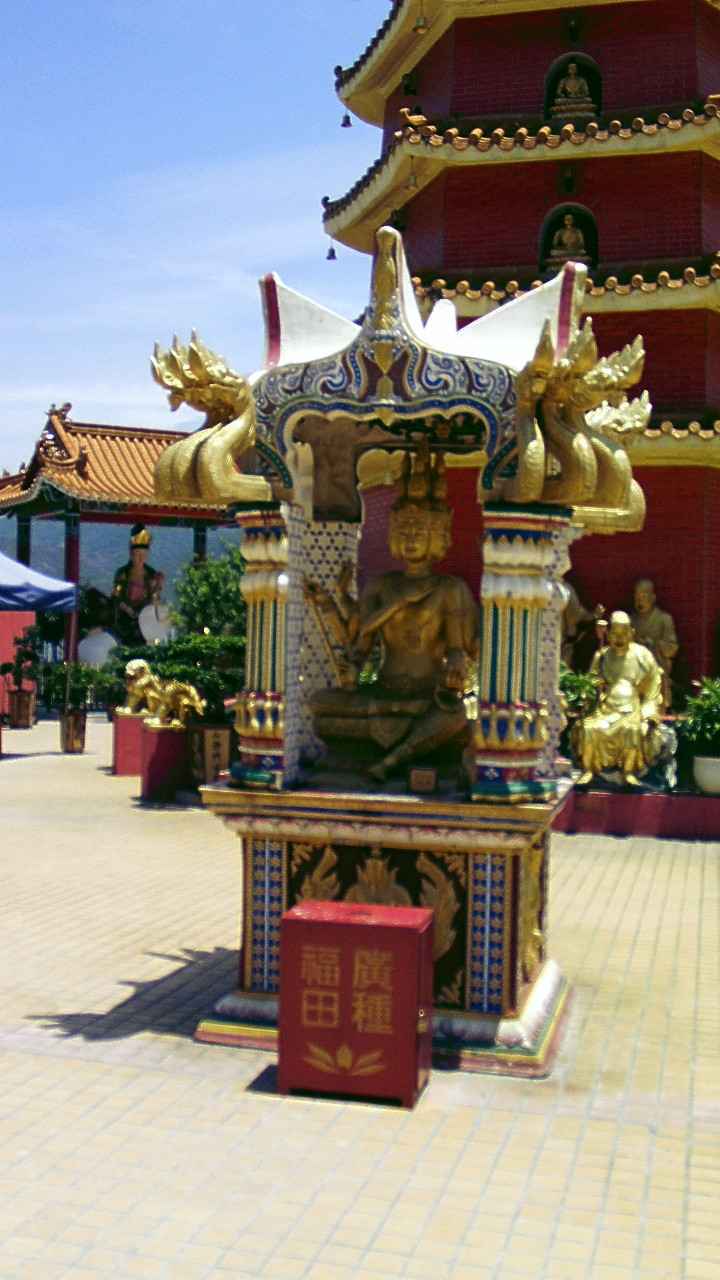
Mahabrahma at the Ten Thousand Buddhas Monastery, Sha Tin, Hong Kong

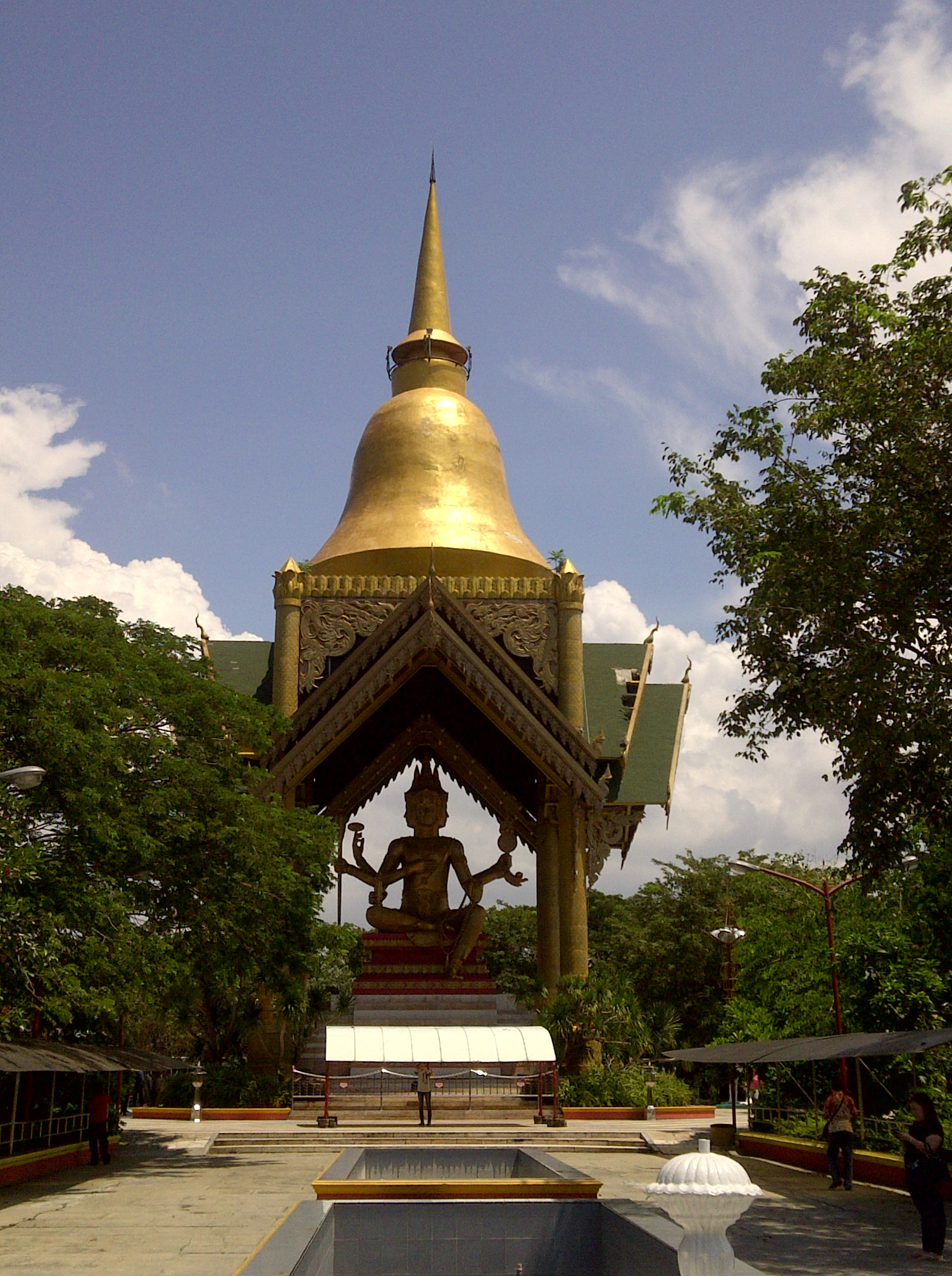
Mahabrahma statue at Sanggar Agung, Surabaya, Indonesia.

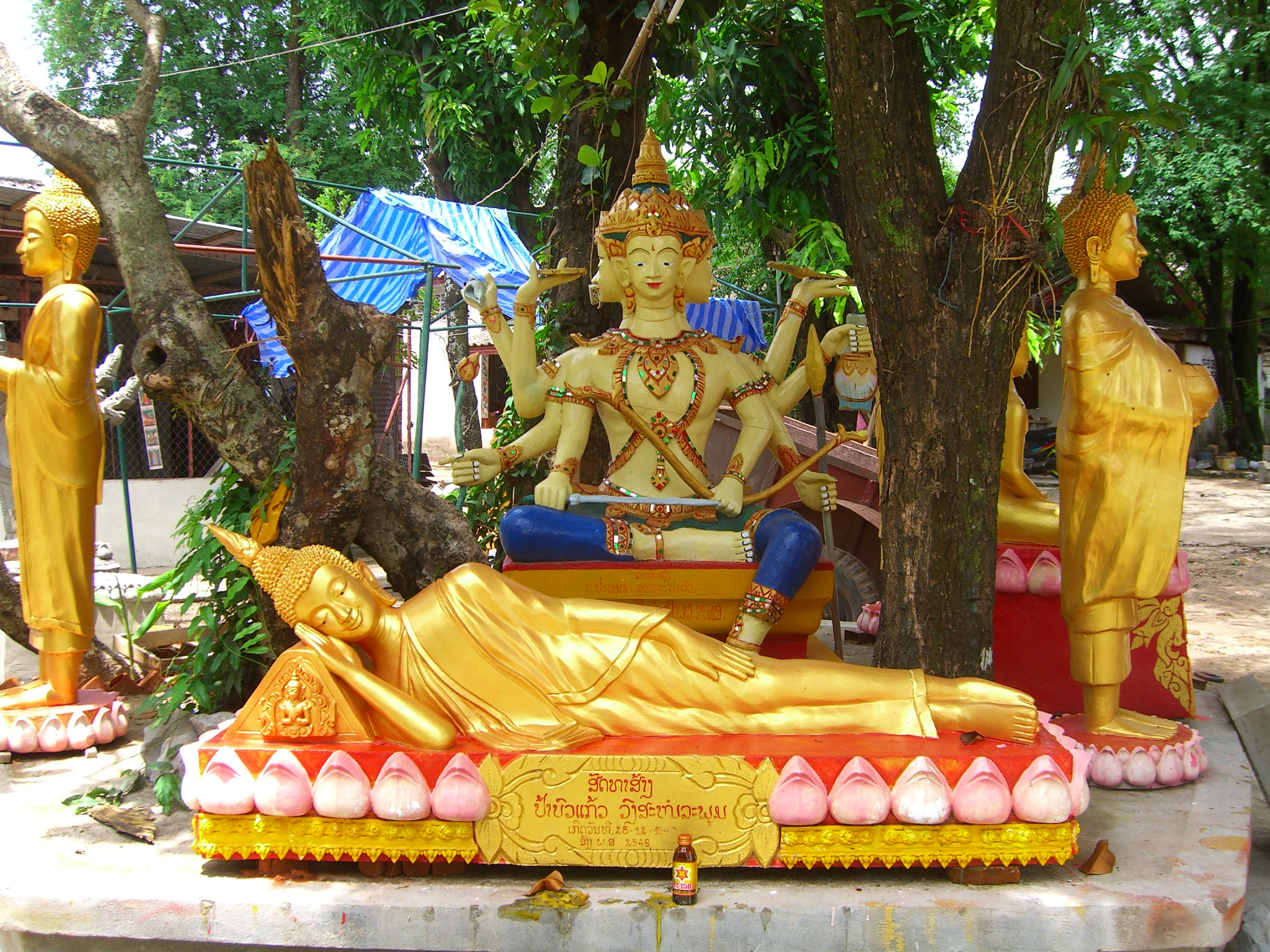
Statue of Mahabrahma in a Laotian Buddhist temple.

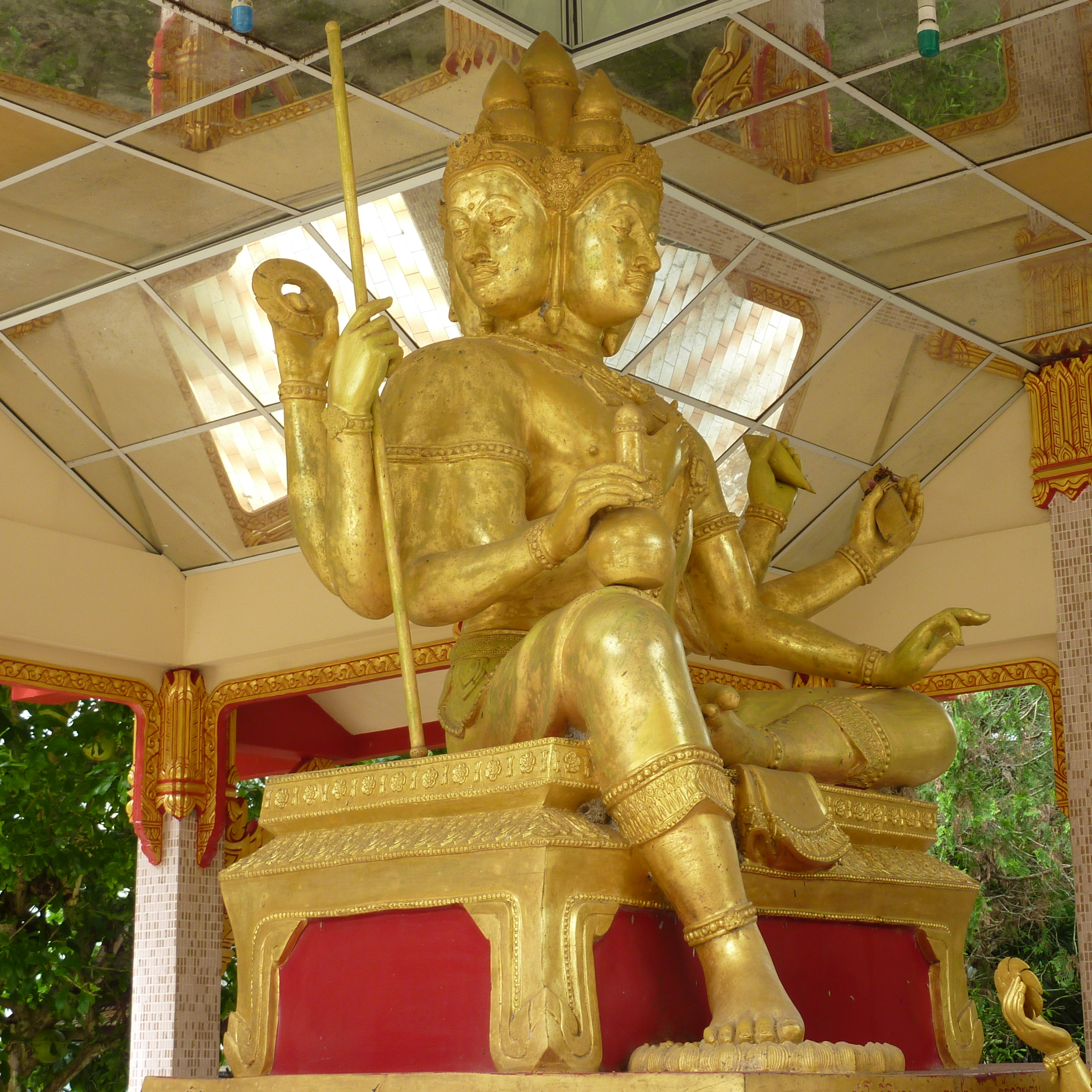
Mahabrahma statue in Wat Phothivihan, Kelantan, Malaysia.

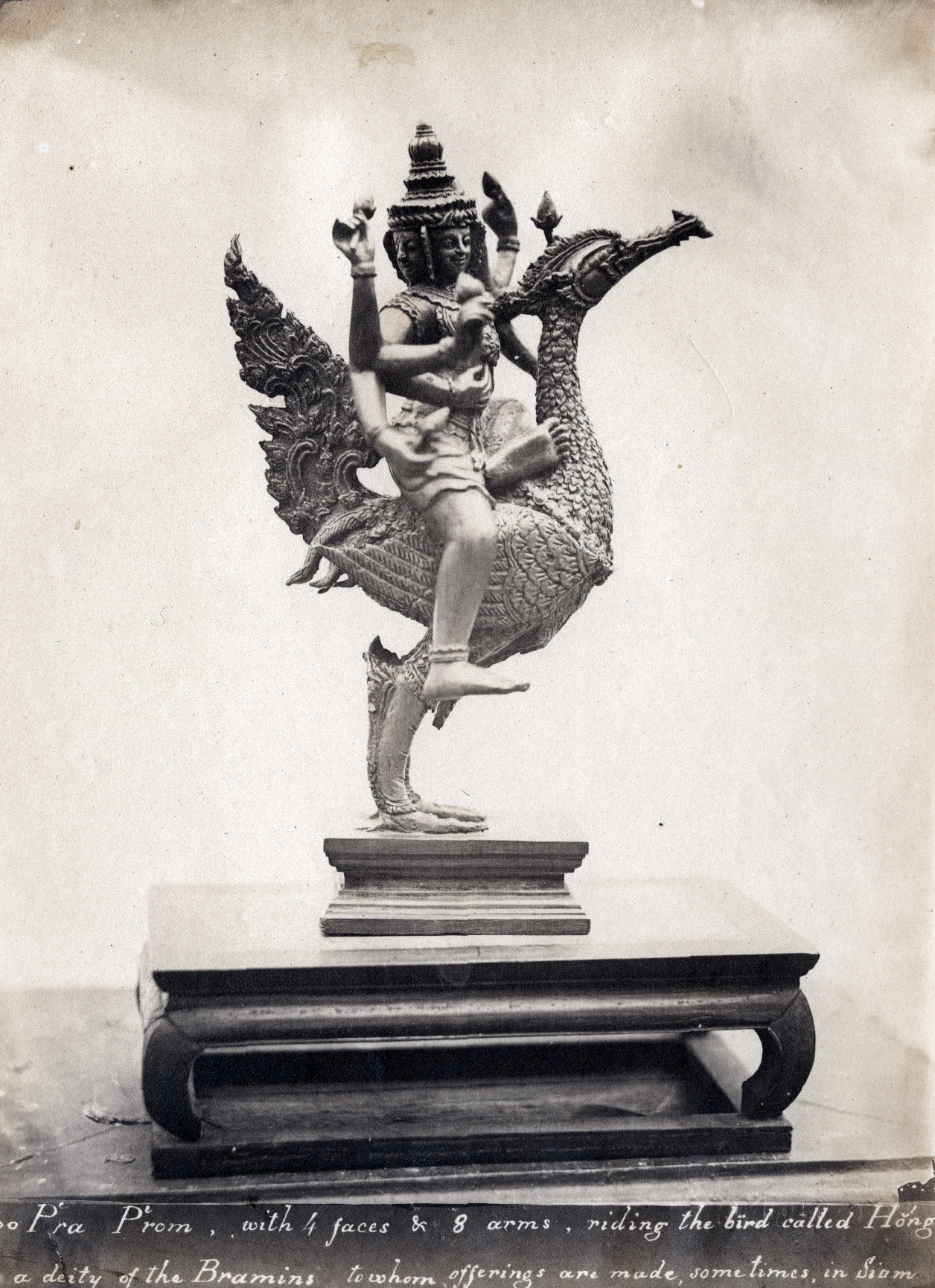
Brahma riding the Hong bird, old statue.

== See also ==
- Śakra
- Maheśvara
- Buddhist cosmology
- Brahmajāla Sutta
