= Shiva in Buddhism =

Figure in Buddhist Mythology

Maheswara
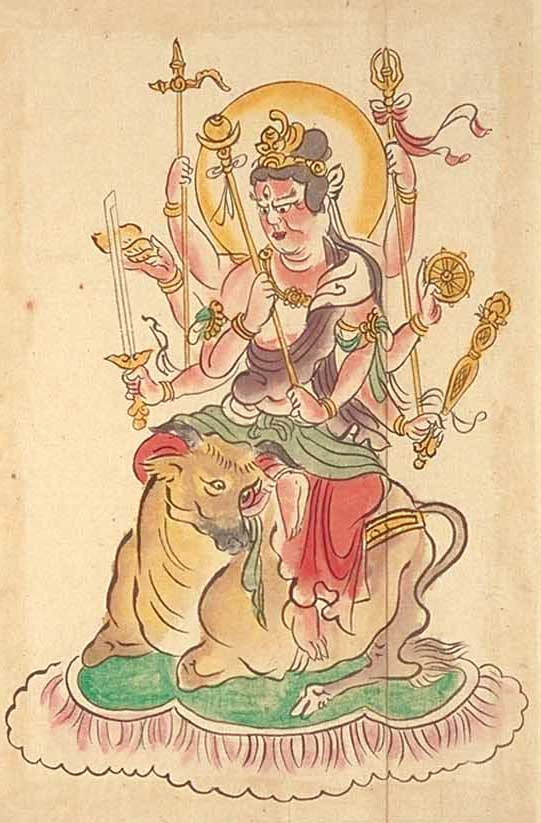
- Sanskrit: Maheśvara
- Pāli: Īsāna; Mahissara
- Chinese: 大自在天 (Pinyin: Dàzìzàitiān)
- Japanese: 大自在天 (romaji: Daijizaiten)
- Tagalog: Mahesbala

Maheśvara (Sanskrit: महेश्वर; Pali: Mahissara; traditional Chinese/Japanese: 大自在天; Pinyin: Dàzìzàitiān, Rōmaji: Daijizaiten) is a prominent heavenly being (deva) in Buddhist mythology. Closely associated with the god Shiva in Hinduism, his role, status, and attributes vary significantly across different Buddhist traditions.

In the Theravāda tradition, where he is primarily known by his ancient epithet Īsāna or Mahissara, he is viewed as a powerful celestial being who remains bound within the cycle of rebirth (saṃsāra), with early texts explicitly rejecting his status as a supreme creator of the universe.

In Mahāyāna and Vajrayāna Buddhism, Maheśvara is variously conceptualized as a powerful worldly deity, an emanation of Avalokiteśvara, or even revered as a bodhisattva in certain esoteric texts.

== Etymology ==
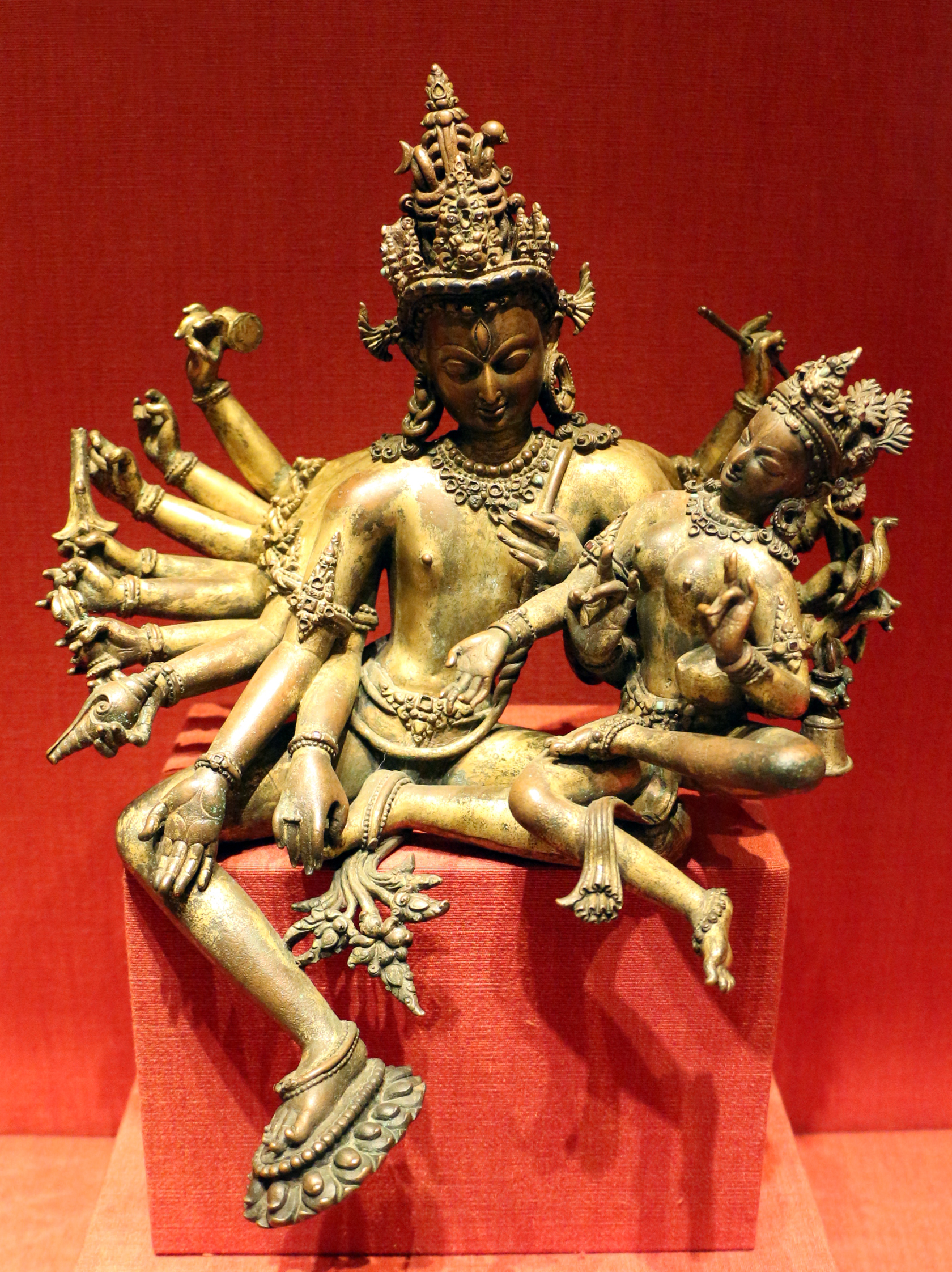
A Nepalese figure of Maheśvara, dated to the 14th century.

The Sanskrit name Maheśvara is composed of two "Mahā" and "Īśvara". The "ā" of mahā and the "ī" of īśvara combine to form a sandhi, which becomes "e", forming the word "Maheśvara". Mahā means "Great" and Īśvara means "lord", hence the name Maheśvara means "the great lord".

== Theravāda Buddhism ==
In the Theravāda tradition, Shiva is not viewed as a supreme deity or creator of the universe, but rather as a heavenly being (deva) who is still bound within the cycle of rebirth (saṃsāra). Theravāda Buddhism explicitly rejects the concept of Issaranimmānavāda, the philosophical view that the world was created by a supreme creator god or Īśvara.

=== Appearances in Pali texts ===
==== Canonical texts ====
In the early Pali texts, Shiva is not referred to by the names Mahādeva or Maheśvara as in the Mahāyāna tradition, but rather by his ancient epithet, Īsāna (from Sanskrit: Īśāna).

In the Dhajagga Sutta (SN 11.3), the Buddha mentions Īsāna as one of the commander deities in the Tāvatiṃsa heaven. Īsāna is described as leading a heavenly army—alongside Sakka (Indra), Pajāpati, and Varuṇa—in a cosmic battle against the Asuras. Īsāna's position in this cosmological hierarchy indicates that he is subordinate to Sakka, the ruler of the Tāvatiṃsa deities.

==== Other texts ====
In addition to Īsāna, the Pali literature also use the term Mahissara to refer to Maheśvara (Shiva). This word is formed through the Pali sandhi rules, combining the words mahā (great) and issara (lord or ruler). However, the mention of Mahissara or Issara in Pali texts is almost always associated with theological contexts concerning the Buddha's refutation of Issaranimmānavāda (the erroneous view that suffering, happiness, and the world order are governed by the will of a supreme deity).

=== Iconography and cultural practices ===
Although classical texts position him as an ordinary deva, Theravāda Buddhists in various Southeast and South Asian countries continue to adopt the veneration of Shiva through cultural and royal syncretism.

In Thailand, Shiva is known as Phra Isuan (Thai: พระอิศวร). His depiction is heavily influenced by the court Brahmanism inherited from the Khmer and Sukhothai eras. In the iconography of Thai Buddhist temples, statues of Phra Isuan are often placed alongside other Hindu deities as protectors of the Dhamma (Dharmapāla). He is not worshipped as a path to absolute liberation, but is rather depicted as a celestial figure who pays homage and submits to the teachings of the Buddha.

In Sri Lanka, unlike Vishnu, who was elevated to the status of the island's primary protector deity, the direct worship of Shiva is less prominent among Sinhalese Buddhists. However, reverence for Shiva's power was strongly absorbed through his son, Skanda, who was syncretized into the deity Kataragama (Murugan). The Kataragama shrine is considered highly sacred by both Sri Lankan Buddhists and Hindus, and he is venerated as one of the four guardian deities (hatara varam deviyo) protecting Buddhism in Sri Lanka.

== Mahāyāna Buddhism ==
=== Contemporary Maheśvara ===
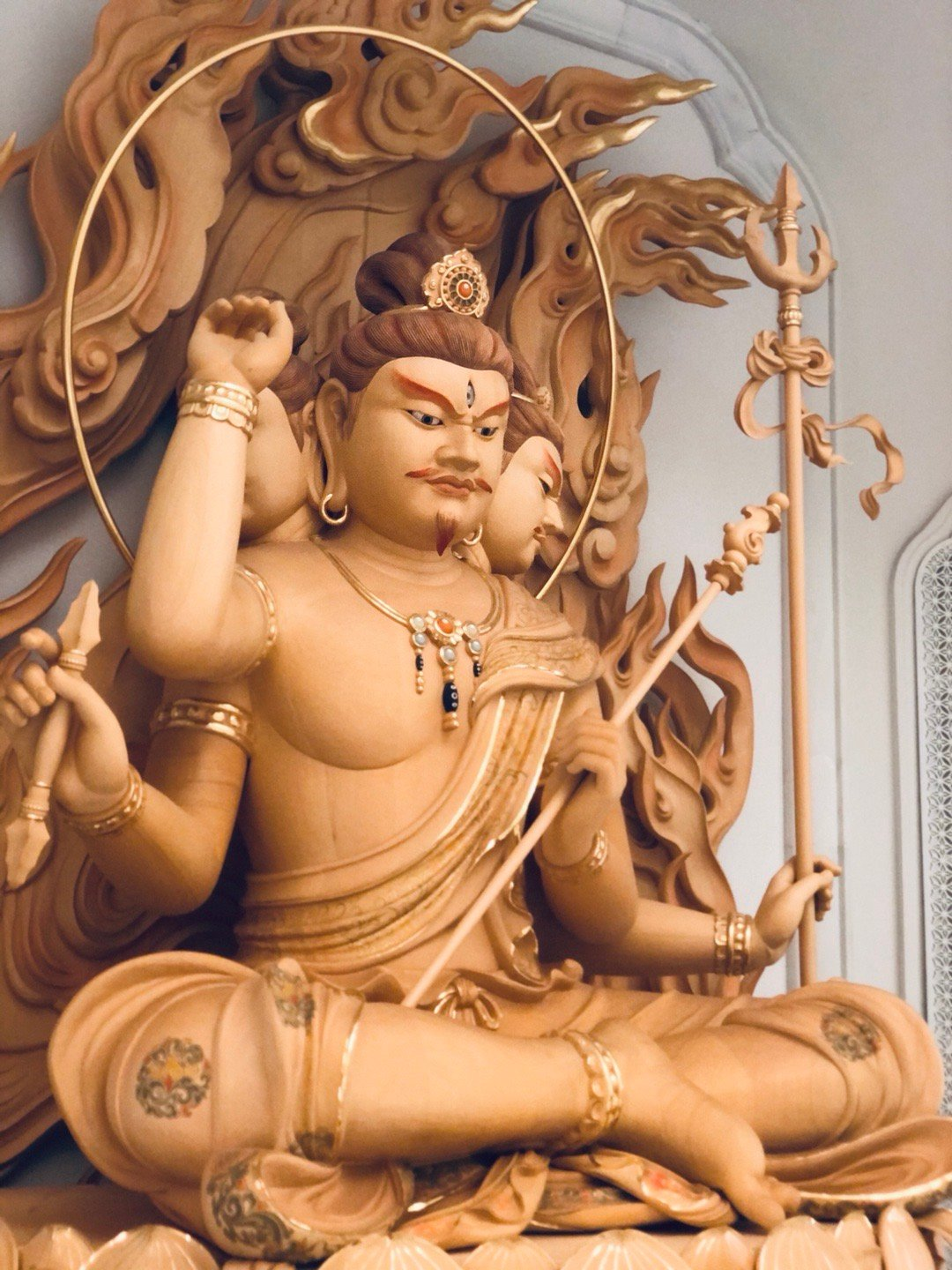
Statue of Dàzìzàitiān (Maheśvara) on Putuoshan Guanyin Dharma Realm in Zhejiang, China

Present Maheśvara is Buddhist by religion, and was reborn as a Deva, because of his merit of donating a cup of honey to Kassapa Buddha in one of his previous lives. According to Karandavyuha Sutra, Maheśvara was born from the brow of Bodhisattva Avalokiteshvara. According to Buddhist traditions, he helps good people, mostly who follow the Buddhist precepts and eat a vegetarian diet, and also punishes bad people for their evil deeds. He helps yogis doing Kundalini Meditation. He is bodhisattva of Tenth Bhumi. He is one of the twenty four protective deities of Chinese Buddhism and of the sixteen dharmapalas of Tibetan Buddhism.

=== Maheśvara and Vajrapāni ===
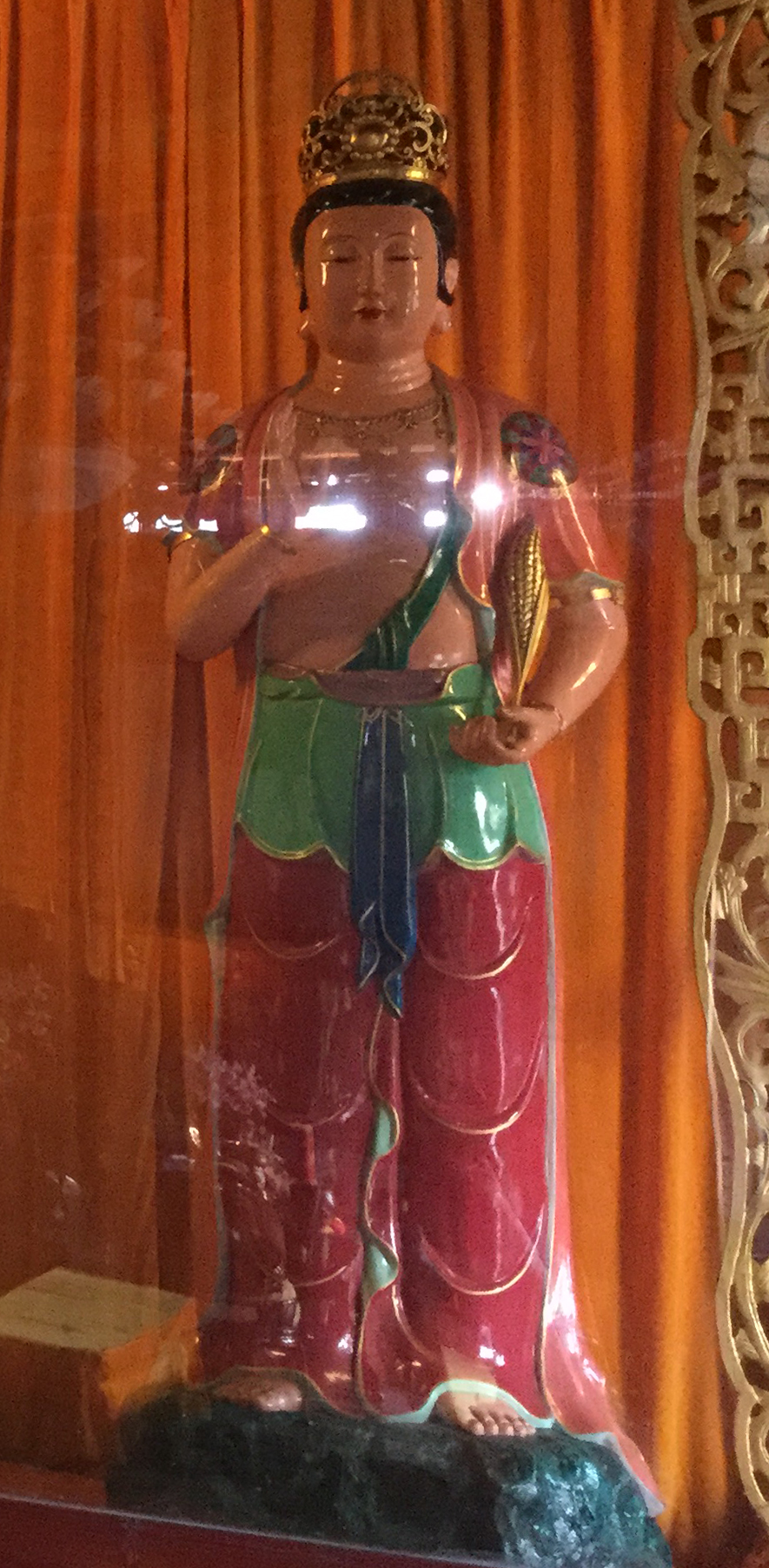
Statue of Dàzìzàitiān (Maheśvara) at Temple of Heaven Garden in Shantou, China

A popular story tells how Vajrapāni kills one Maheśvara, because of his evil deeds. The story occurs in several scriptures, most notably the Sarvatathāgatatattvasaṅgraha and the Vajrāpanyābhiṣeka Mahātantra. The story begins with the transformation of the bodhisattva Samantabhadra into Vajrapāni by Vairocana, the cosmic Buddha, receiving a vajra and the name "Vajrāpani". Vairocana then requests Vajrapāni to generate his adamantine family in order to establish a mandala. Vajrapāni refuses because Maheśvara "is deluding beings with his deceitful religious doctrines and engaging in all kinds of violent criminal conduct". Maheśvara and his entourage are dragged to Mount Meru, and all but Maheśvara, who is too proud as ruler of the Three Worlds, submit. Vajrapāni and Maheśvara engage in a magical combat, which is won by Vajrapāni. Maheśvara's retinue become part of Vairocana's mandala, except for Maheśvara, who is killed, and his life transferred to another realm where he becomes a Buddha named Bhasmeśvaranirghoṣa, the "Soundless Lord of Ashes".

=== Mantra ===
- Chinese:

那嘛 薩曼達 布達喃 嗡 伊hi耶hi 嘛嘿思瓦啦雅 斯哇哈
Nàma sàmàndá bùdánán wēng yīhiyéhi mahēisīwǎlayǎ sīwahā (romanisation)
Namaḥ samanta buddhānām oṃ ehyehi maheśvaraya svāhā (Sanskrit)

- Japanese:

オン・マケイシバラヤ・ソワカ
On makeishibaraya sowaka (romanisation)
Oṃ maheśvaraya svāhā (Sanskrit)

Both the Chinese and Japanese mantras are phonetic transcriptions of verses originally composed in Sanskrit.

== See also ==
- Mahakala - Deity related to Shiva venerated in Tibetan Buddhism and Hinduism
- Śakra - Ruler of Tavatimsa heaven
- Mahabrahma - Ruler of Brahma world
- Vishnu in Buddhism
- God in Buddhism
- Tenjin (kami)
- Guanyin
