= Phra Phrom =

Thai representation of the god Brahma

Phra Phrom of Erawan Shrine in Bangkok, Thailand

Phra Phrom (Thai: พระพรหม; from Sanskrit: Brahmā, ब्रह्मा) is the Thai representation of the Hindu creator god Brahma. In modern Thailand, Phra Phrom is often worshipped outside of Hindu contexts by regular Buddhists, and, like many other Hindu deities, has usually come to represent guardian spirits in Thai animist beliefs, which coexist alongside Buddhist practices. He is regarded as the deity of good fortune and protection. The concept of Brahma is also represented in Buddhist cosmology as Brahmā or Mahabrahma, the lord of Brahmaloka (the highest heavenly realm), which may also be represented as Phra Phrom.

Phra Phrom is colloquially known outside Thailand as the Four-Faced Buddha (四面佛, Sìmiànfó) or Four-Faced God (四面神 Simianshen) among Chinese folk religious worshipers, among whom the faith of this god has spread in the latest decades.

== Worship ==
Worshipers of the god usually offer incense, candles, jasmine flowers or jasmine garlands and young coconut milk (with water in them) in their worship, usually placing these offerings before all four heads of Phra Phrom, each head representing a different aspect of the deity; it is believed each side of Phra Phrom offers different blessings. Another common way of worship is to place wooden elephant statues on the altar to honor him. Phra Phrom is also known to admire Thai classical music, which is played near larger scale outdoor altars, accompanied by dancers. For a small fee, the dancers include worshiper's name into the songs they sing while dancing. Worshipers of Phra Phrom are also usually advised to abstain from consuming meat. It is also believed that worshipers have to make good on any promises made to the deity else misfortune will befall them instead of the fortune that was asked for. Items needed for prayers are available in the premises of the shrine.

The main example of this representation of Brahma is the statue at the Erawan Shrine in Bangkok, where the faith of the god has its origins in modern times. The golden dome of the Government House of Thailand also contains a statue of Phra Phrom.

== Spread among ethnic Chinese ==
As early as the 1980s, the popularity of the Erawan worshippers of Phra Phrom from its inceptions in Thailand spread, accompanied by faithful reproduction of the structure of the Thai-style shrine and the image, among overseas Chinese in other countries of Southeast Asia (Singapore, Indonesia and Malaysia), in Taiwan, and in China, with shrines established in Hong Kong, Shanghai and Guangzhou.

An altar dedicated to Phra Phrom in Kaohsiung, Taiwan.

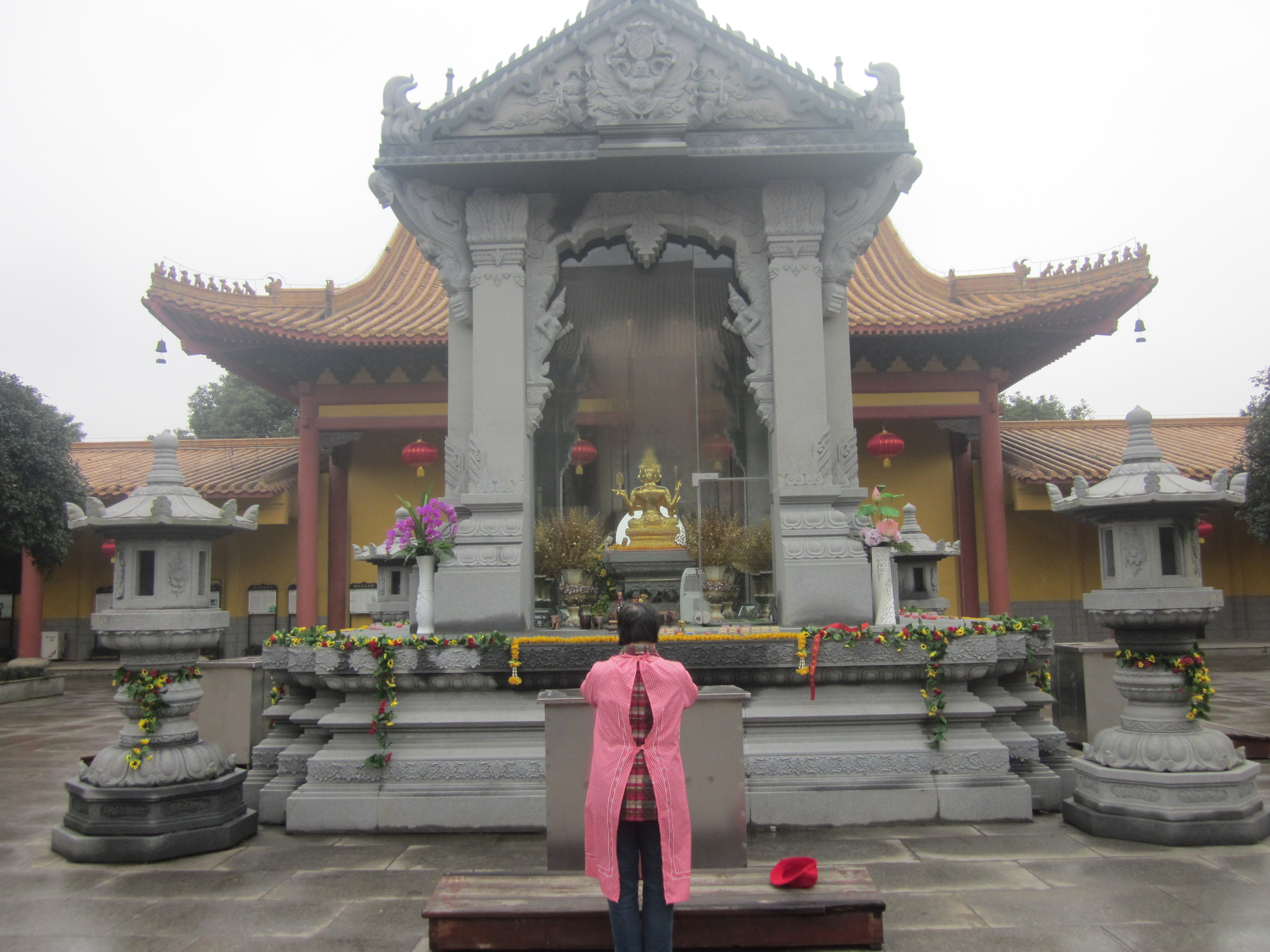
Phra Phrom shrine at Xixin Chan Temple in Hunan, China.

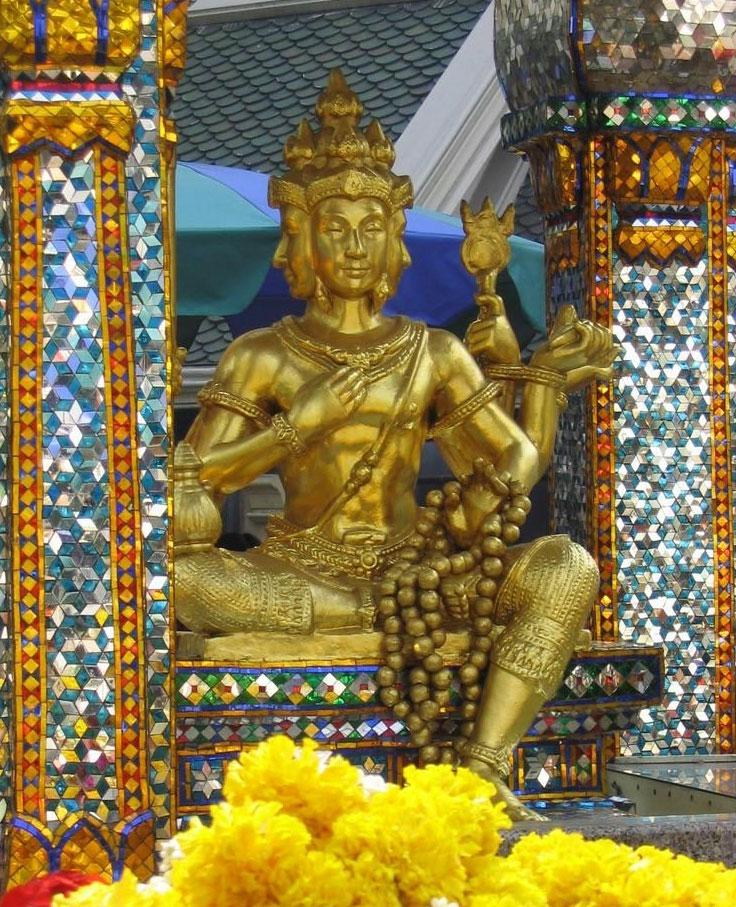
Phra Phrom statue at the Erawan Shrine, Bangkok

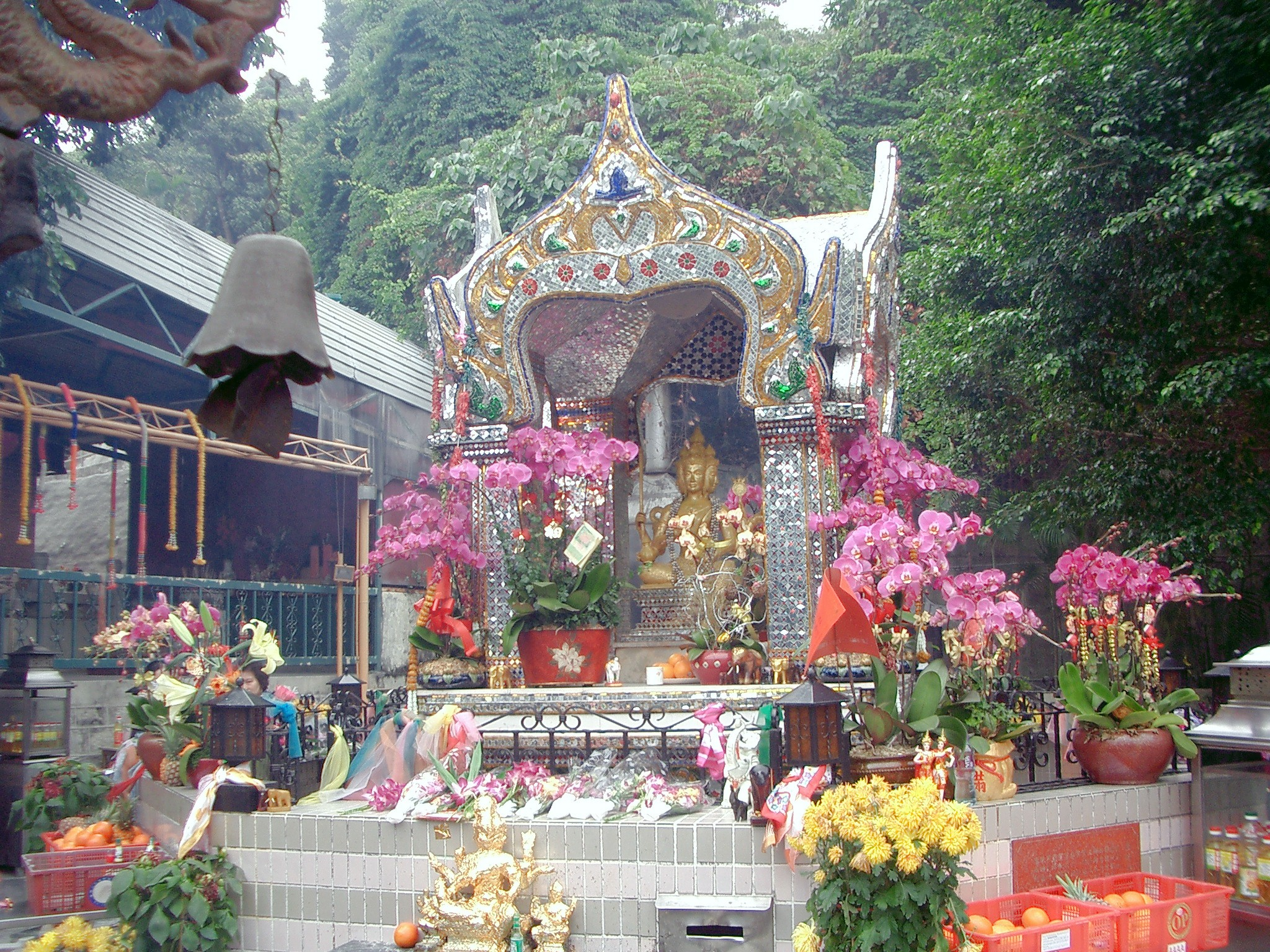
Phra Phrom statue of Koon Ngam Ching Yuen, Sha Tin, Hong Kong

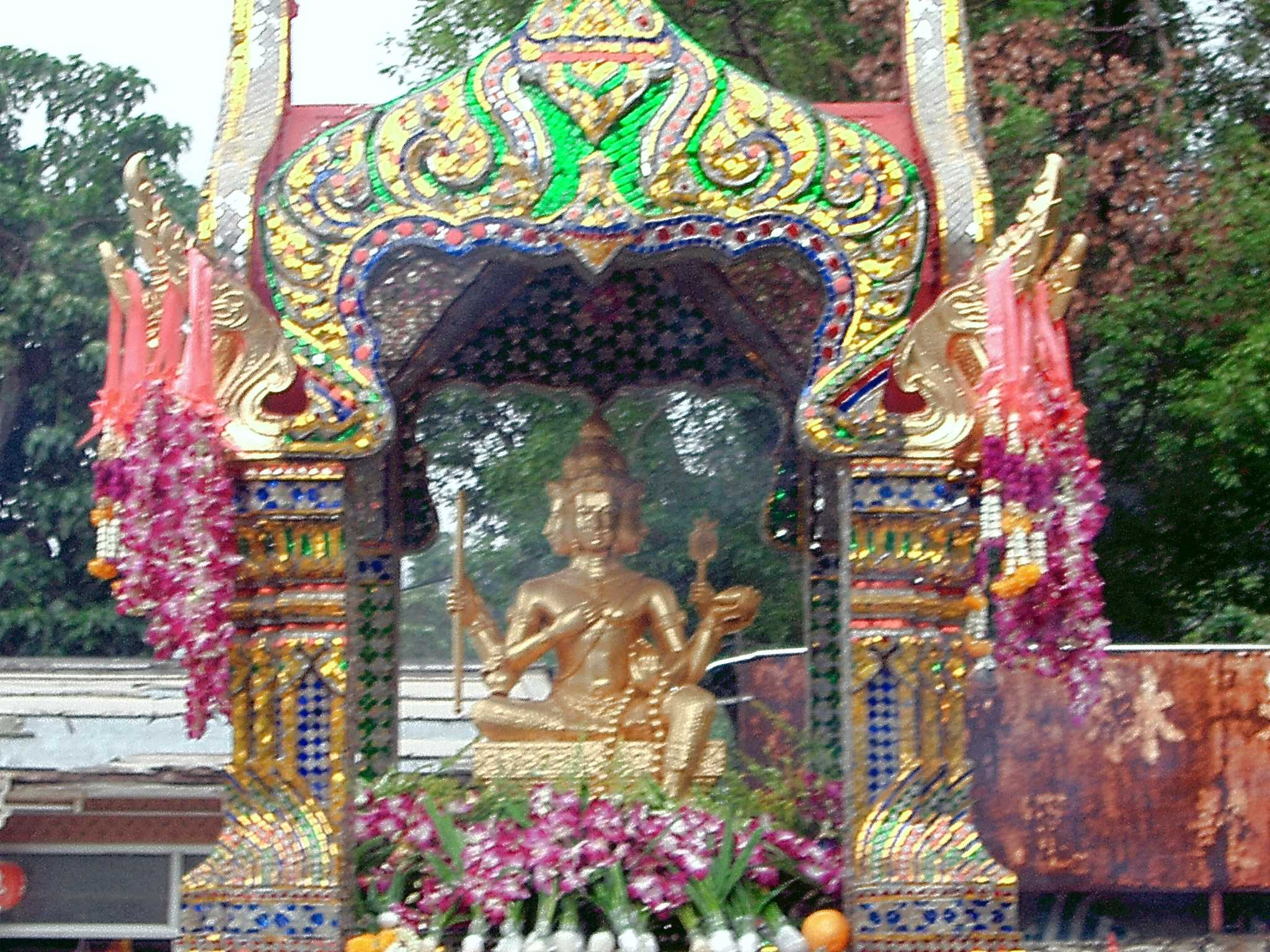
Phra Phrom statue of Chuk Lam Sim, Fu Yung Shan, Tsuen Wan, Hong Kong

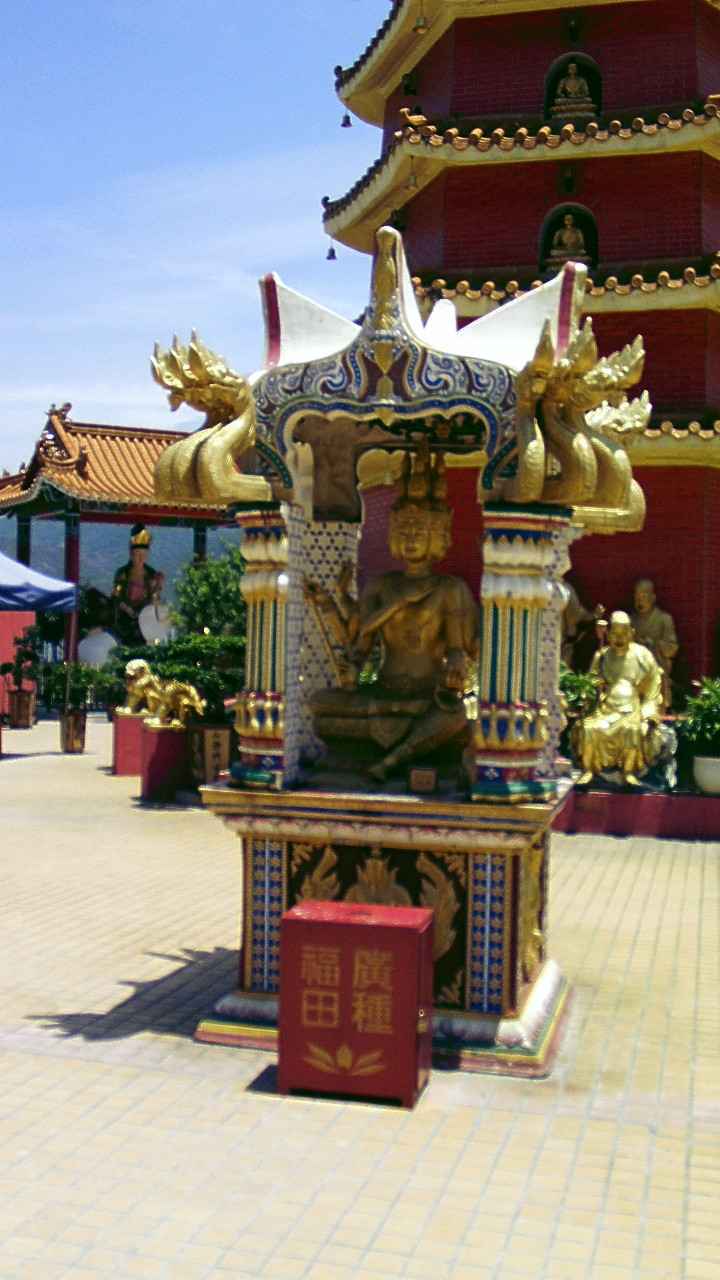
Phra Phrom at the Ten Thousand Buddhas Monastery, Sha Tin, Hong Kong

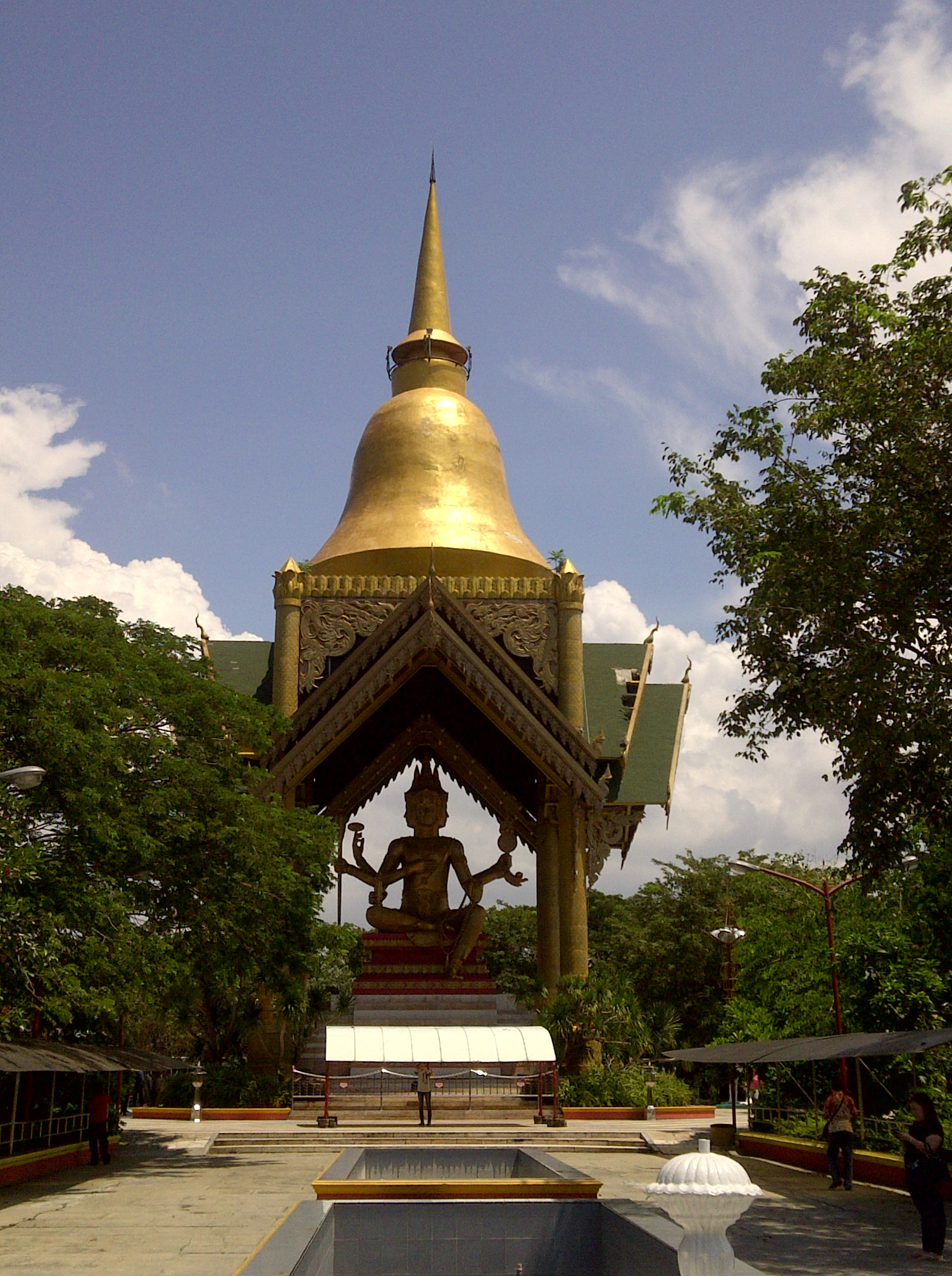
Phra Phrom statue at Sanggar Agung, Surabaya, Indonesia.

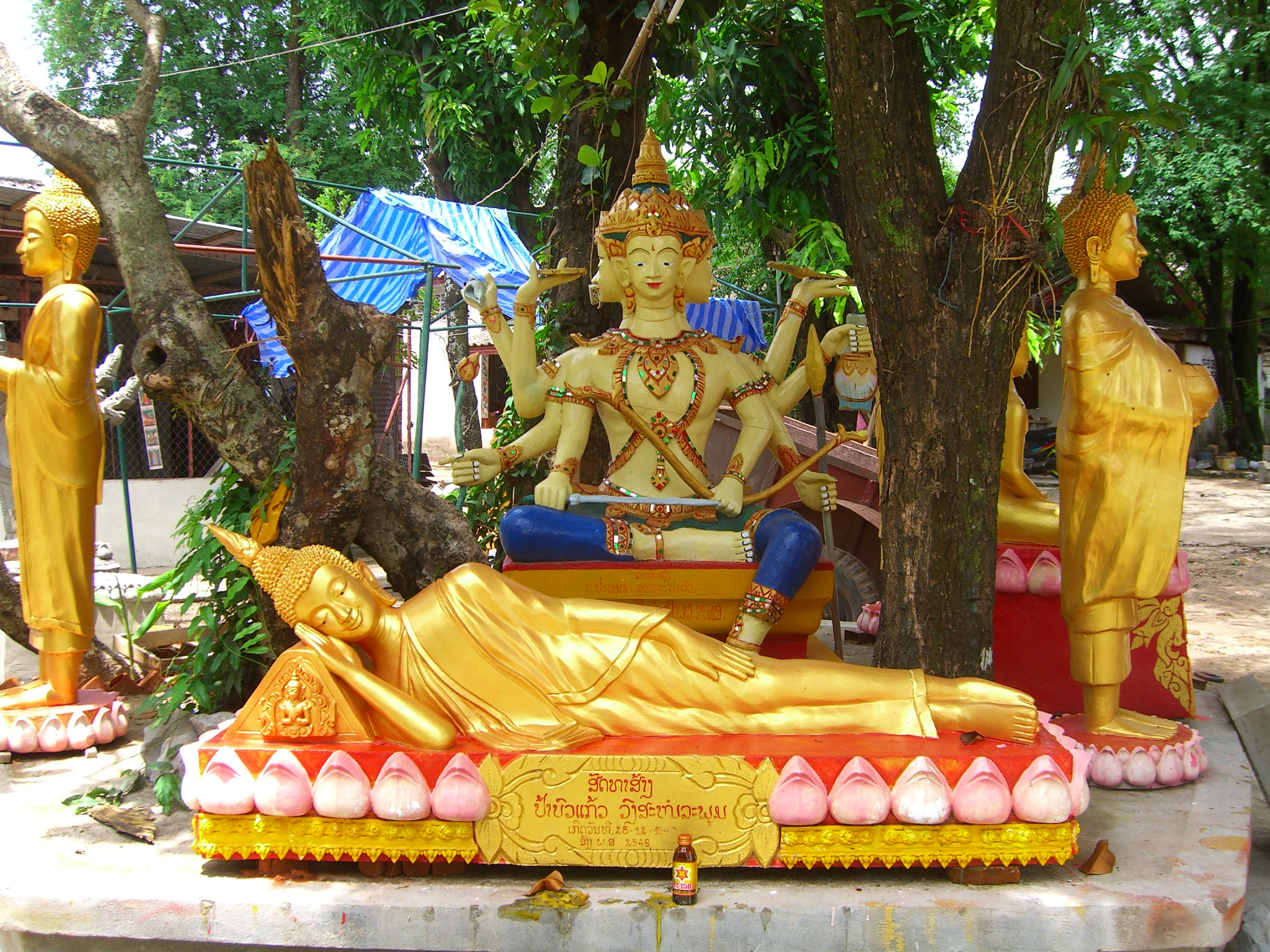
Statue of Phra Phrom in a Laotian Buddhist temple.

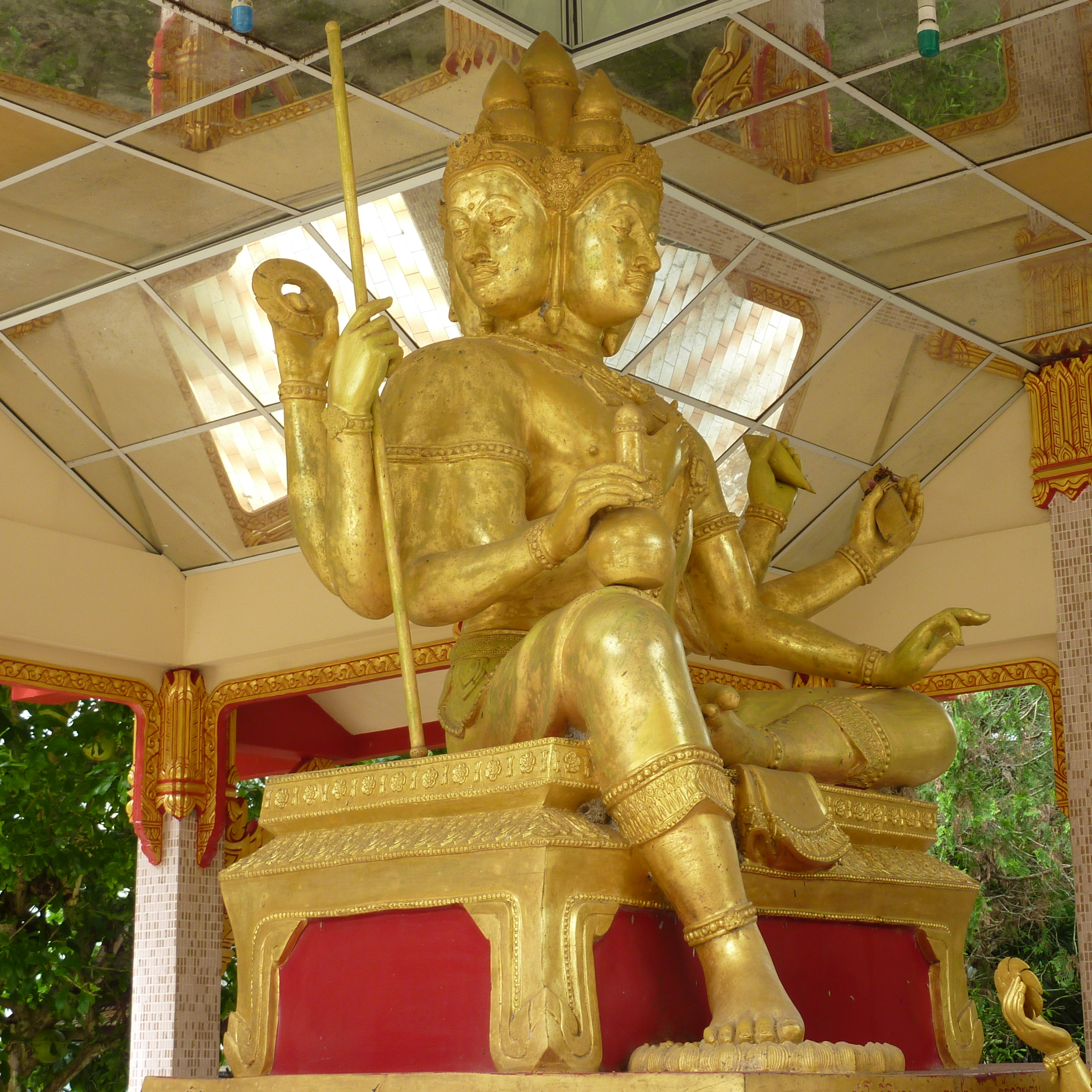
Phra Phrom statue in Wat Phothivihan, Kelantan, Malaysia.

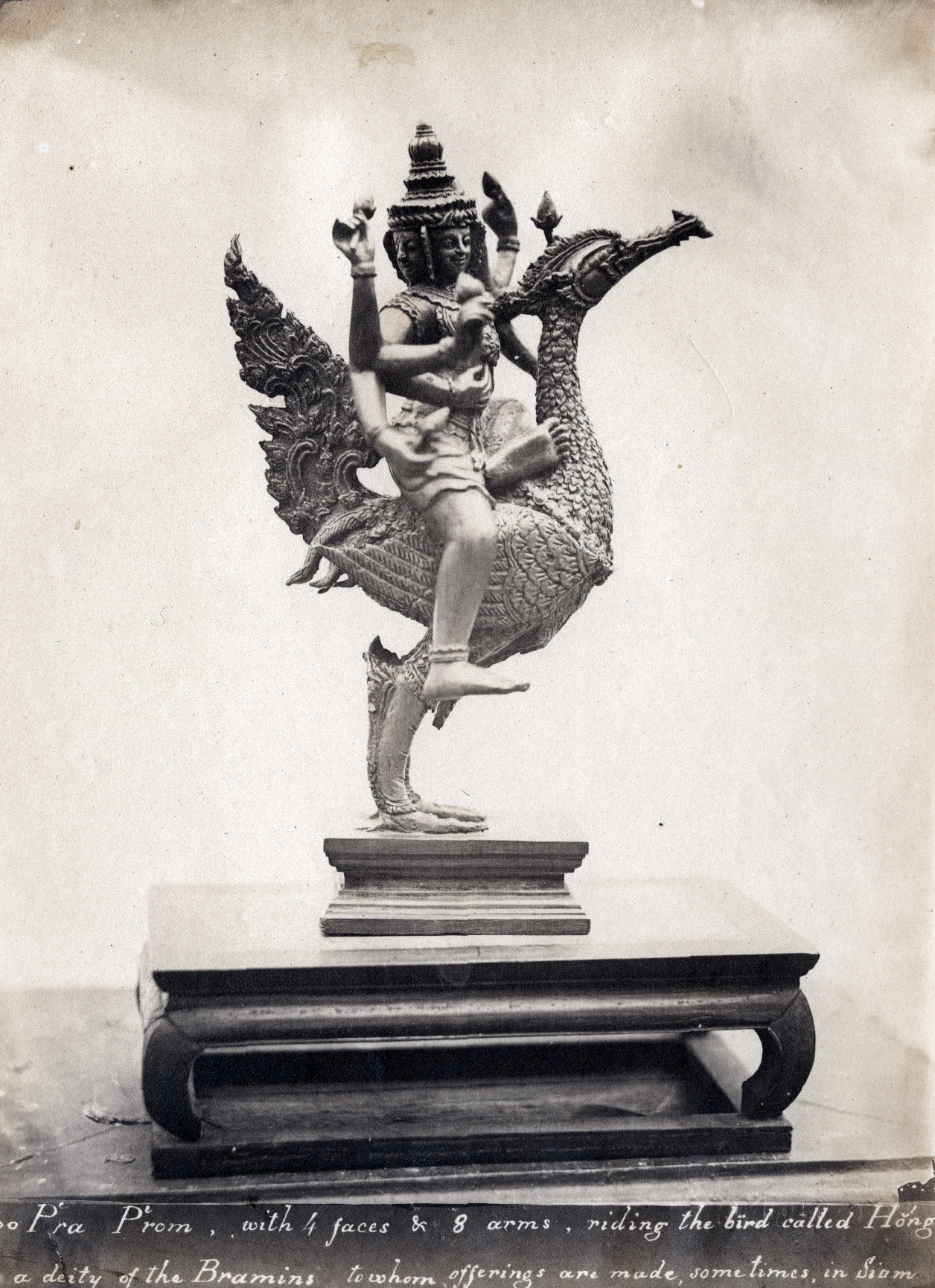
Phra Phrom riding the Hong bird, old statue.

== See also ==
- Sīvali
- Phra Malai
- Phra Mae Thorani
- Erawan Shrine
- Spirit house
- Dharmapala
