= Wat Phothivihan =

Buddhist temple in Malaysia

- Malay: Wat Phothivihan; Thai: วัดโพธิวิหาร
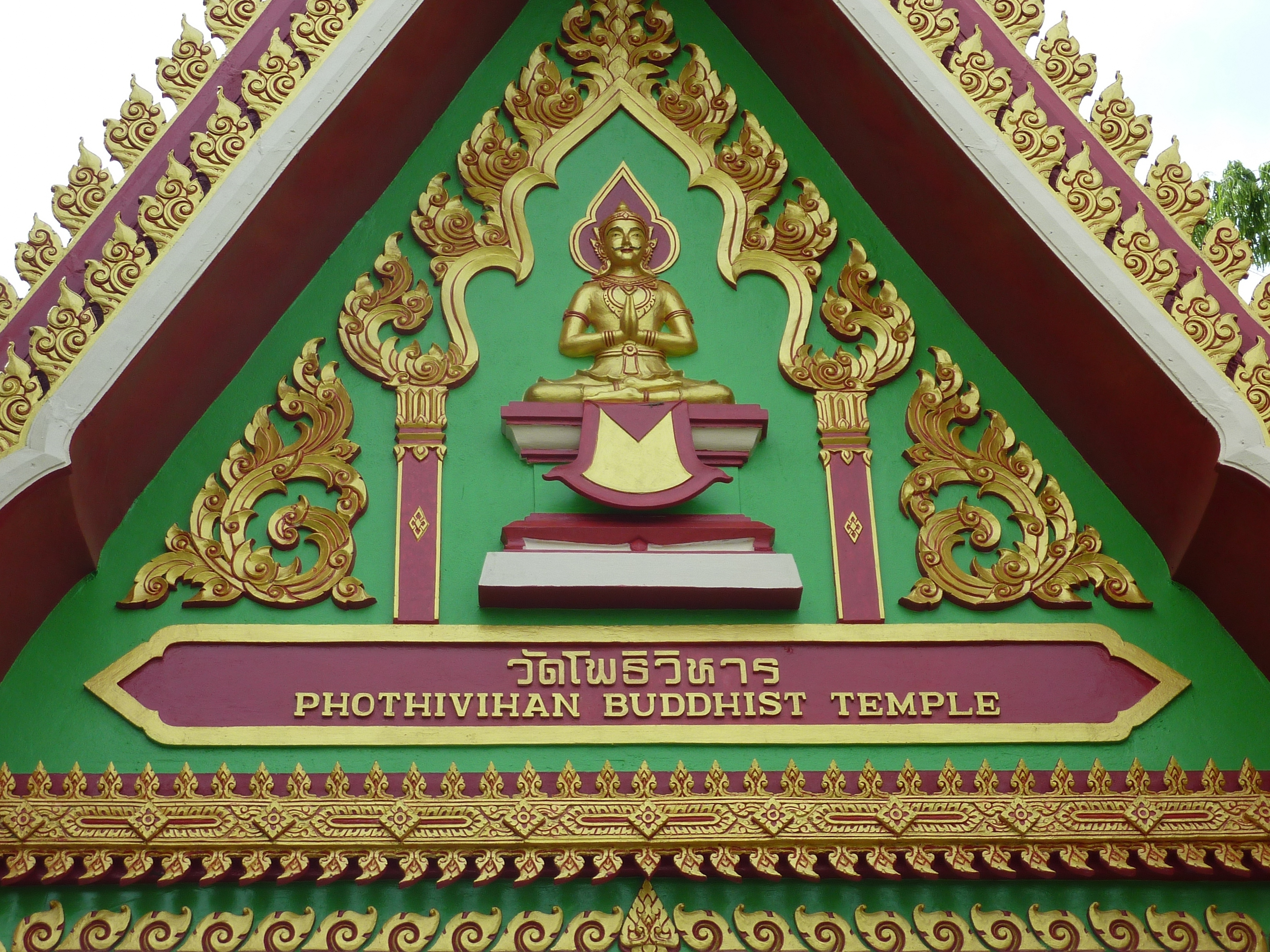
- Front view of the temple

Religion
- Affiliation: Buddhism
- District: Tumpat District

Location
- Location: Tumpat
- State: Kelantan
- Country: Malaysia
- Geographic coordinates: 6°7′48.824″N 102°8′15.502″E

Architecture
- Type: Thai temple
- Founder: Phra Krurasapia Chakorn
- Date established: 1973

Wat Photivihan (Thai: วัดโพธิวิหาร; RTGS: Wat Phothiwihan) (also called as the Phothivihan Buddhist Temple) or Wat Yamu (Thai: วัดยามู), is a Thai temple in Tumpat District, Kelantan, Malaysia. It is one of 25 temples found in Tumpat and is one of the most popular in the country.

== History ==
The temple was established in 1973 by abbot Phra Krurasapia Chakorn which attracts thousands of Thai pilgrims every year.

== Features ==
The temple houses a 40-metre (130 ft) statue of a sleeping Buddha, which is considered as the largest and longest in the state since its construction in 1975. Upon its completion in 1979, the statue is recognised as one of the two reclining Buddha statues in Malaysia and also the largest in Southeast Asia until being surpassed by the 66-metre statue in Chaukhtatgyi Buddha Temple of Myanmar. The devotees of this temple are mainly ethnic Thais since the temple itself is a typical Thai Buddhist temple of Theravāda Buddhism. Despite this, there is also a Chinese Pavilion, Tibetan style hall featuring a statue of the Bodhisattva Avalokiteśvara with 18 arms and Phra Phrom, the four-faced goddess. The compound also includes accommodation for monks and visitors. There is plenty of free parking and entrance to the temple is free with any donations from the visitors are always welcomed.

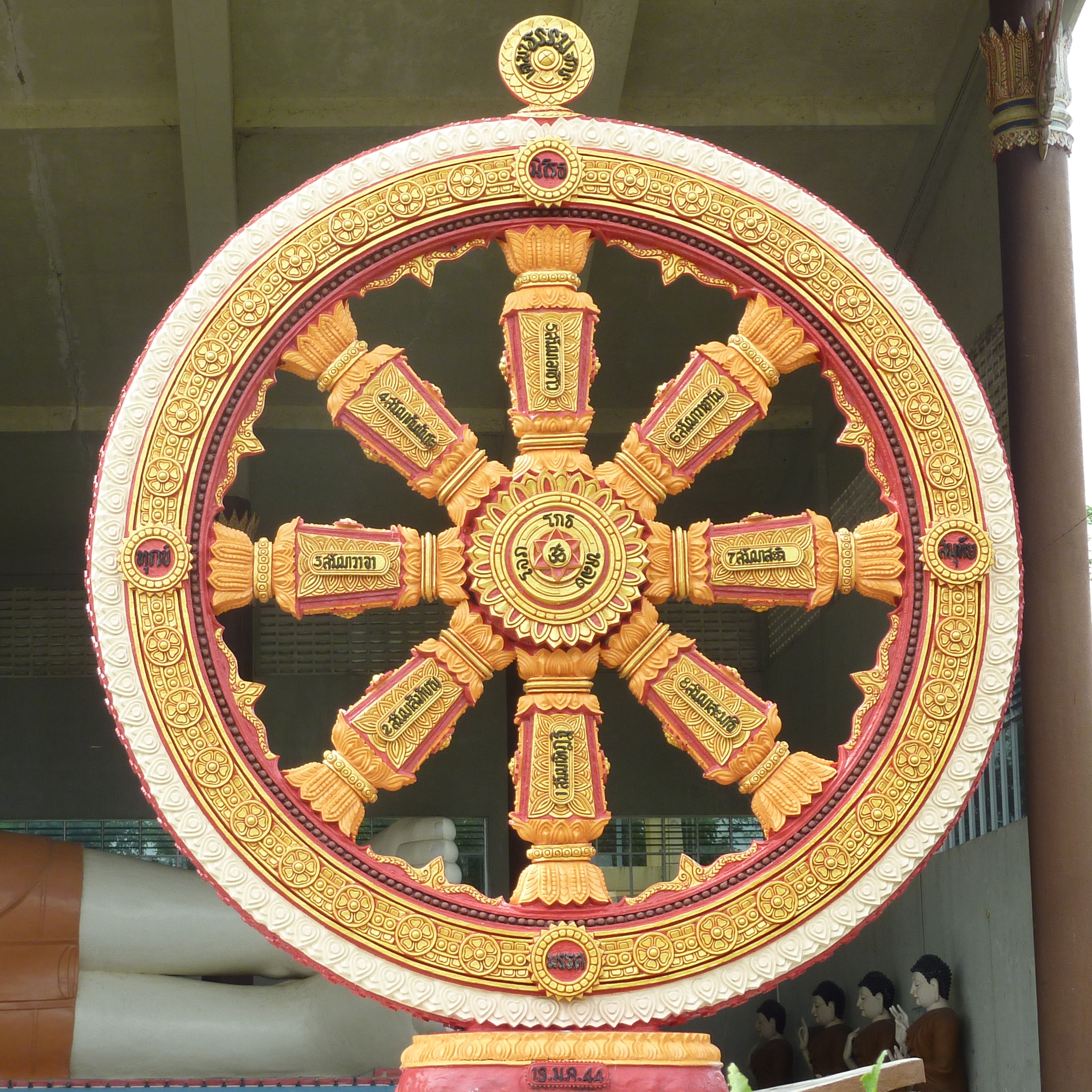
Dharmachakra wheel.

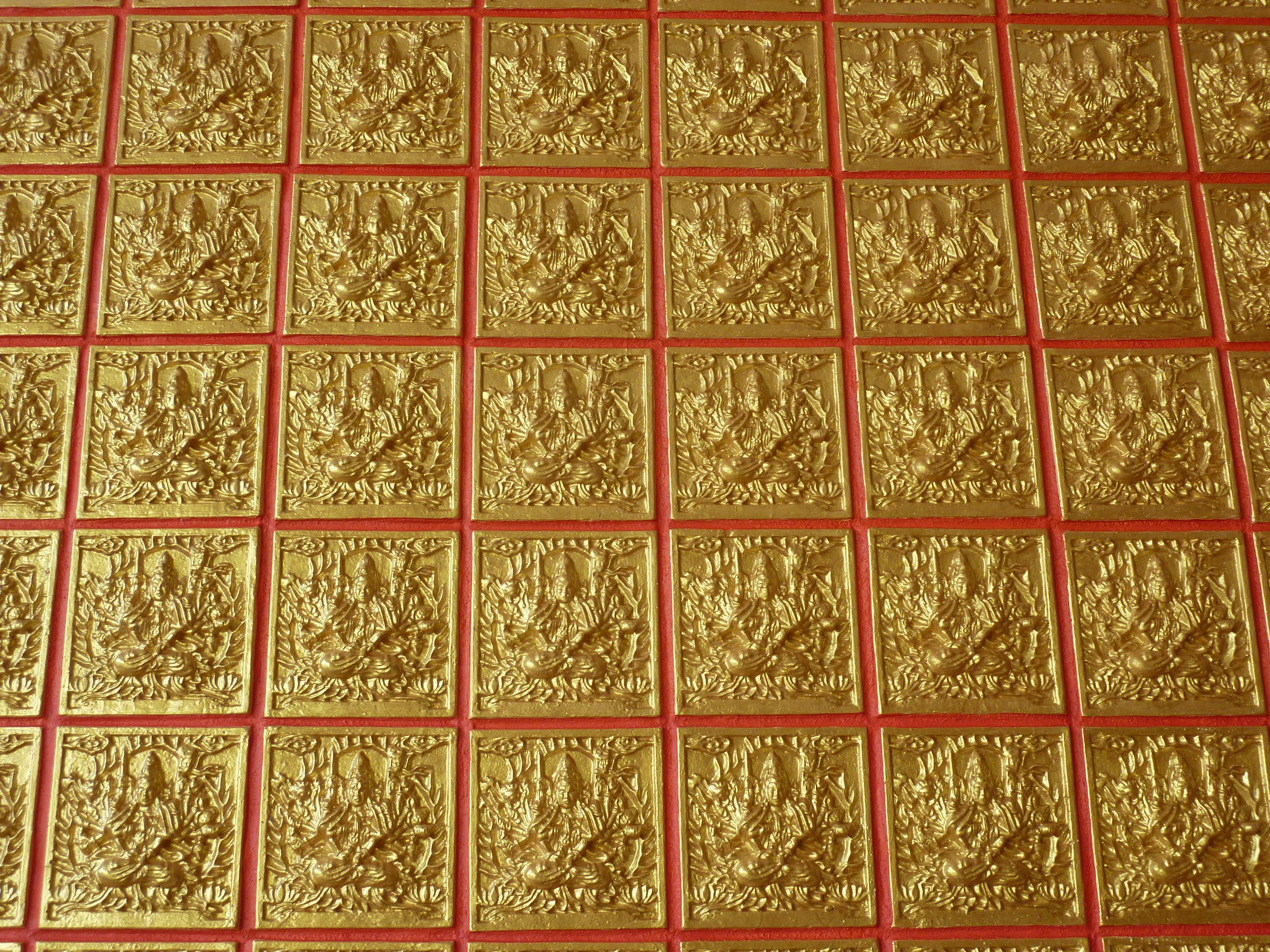
Golden tiles.

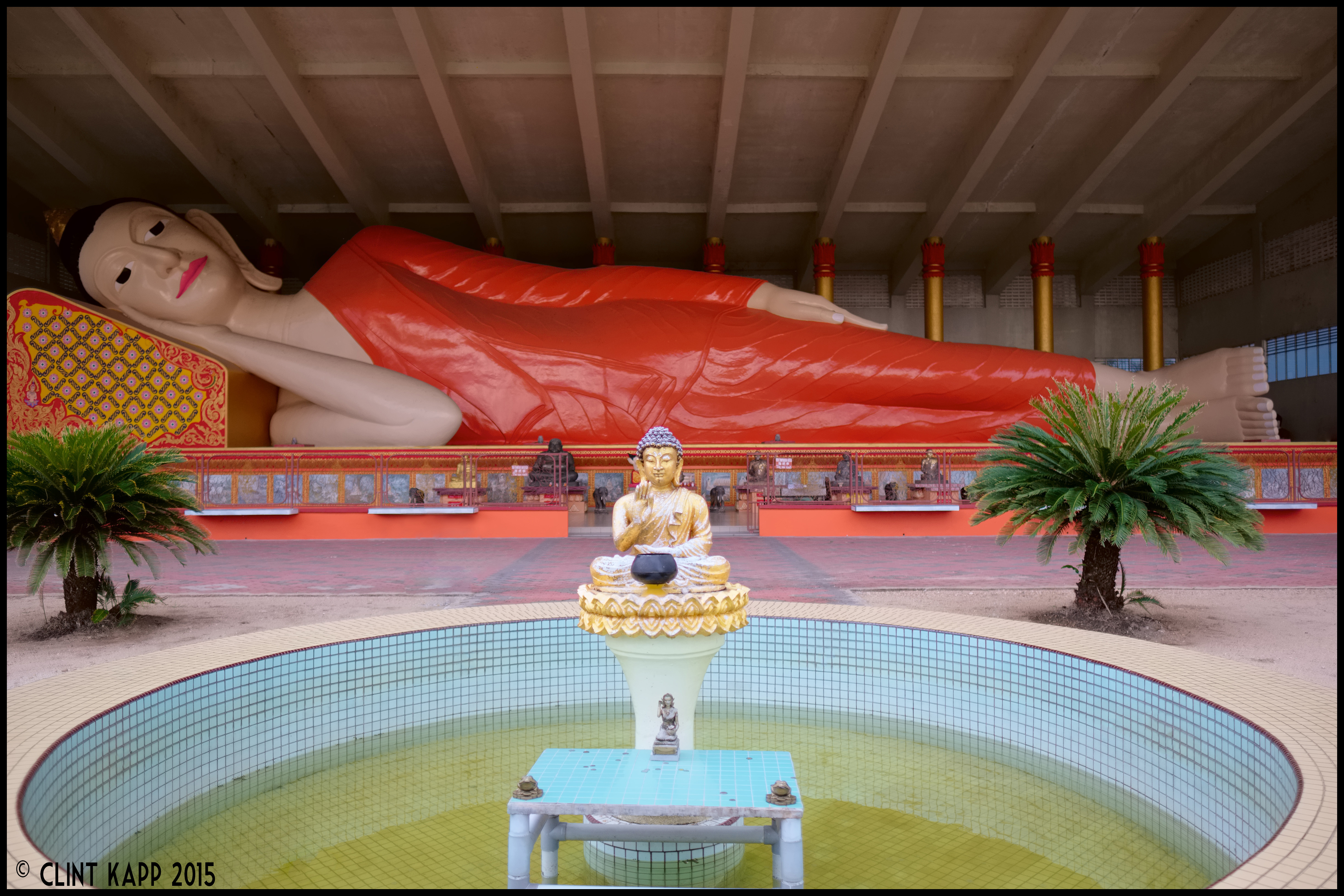
Reclining Buddha in the temple compound.

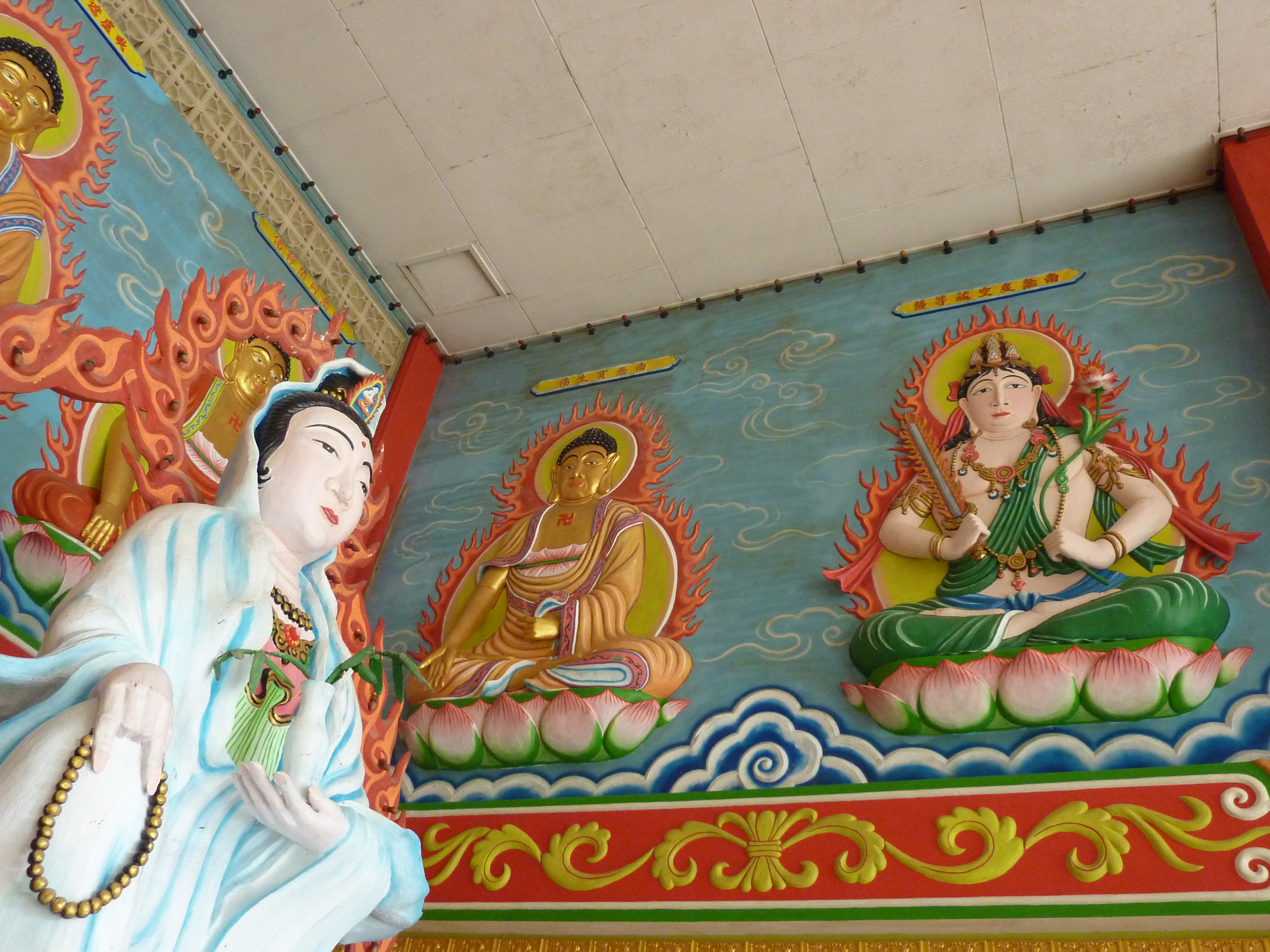
Guan Yin in the Chinese Pavilion part.

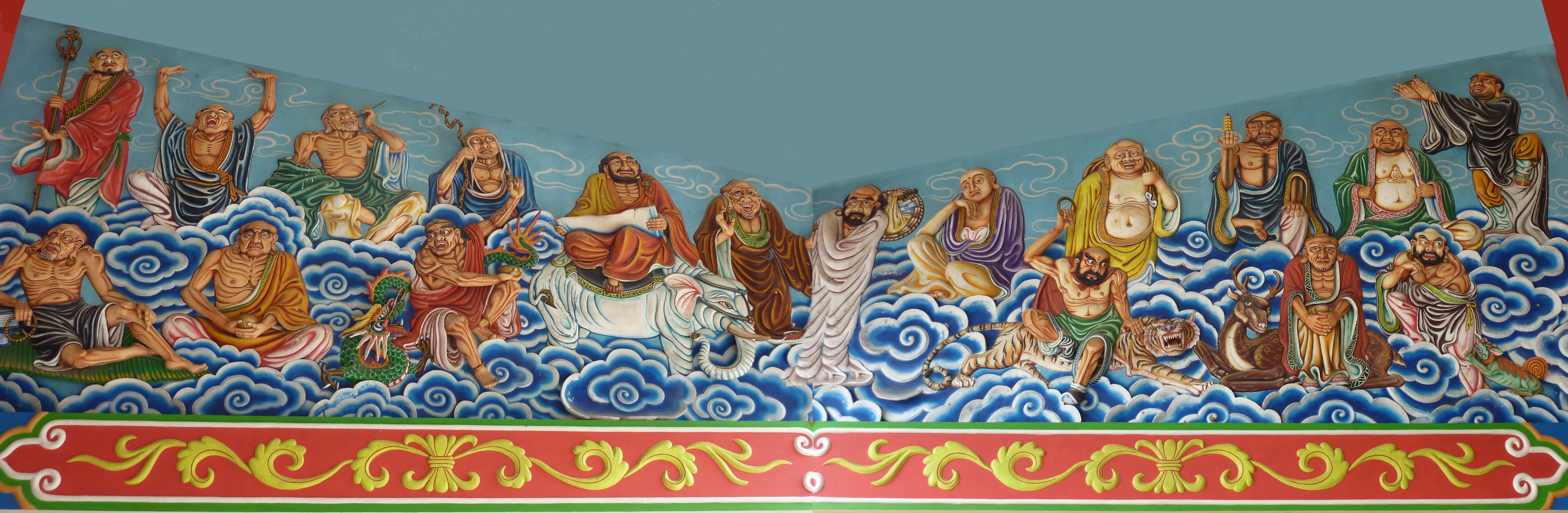
Arahant in the temple wall.
