= Daikokuten =

Japanese deity of fortune and wealth

- God of wealth, fortune, the household, agriculture, fertility, sexuality and war
- Member of the Seven Lucky Gods
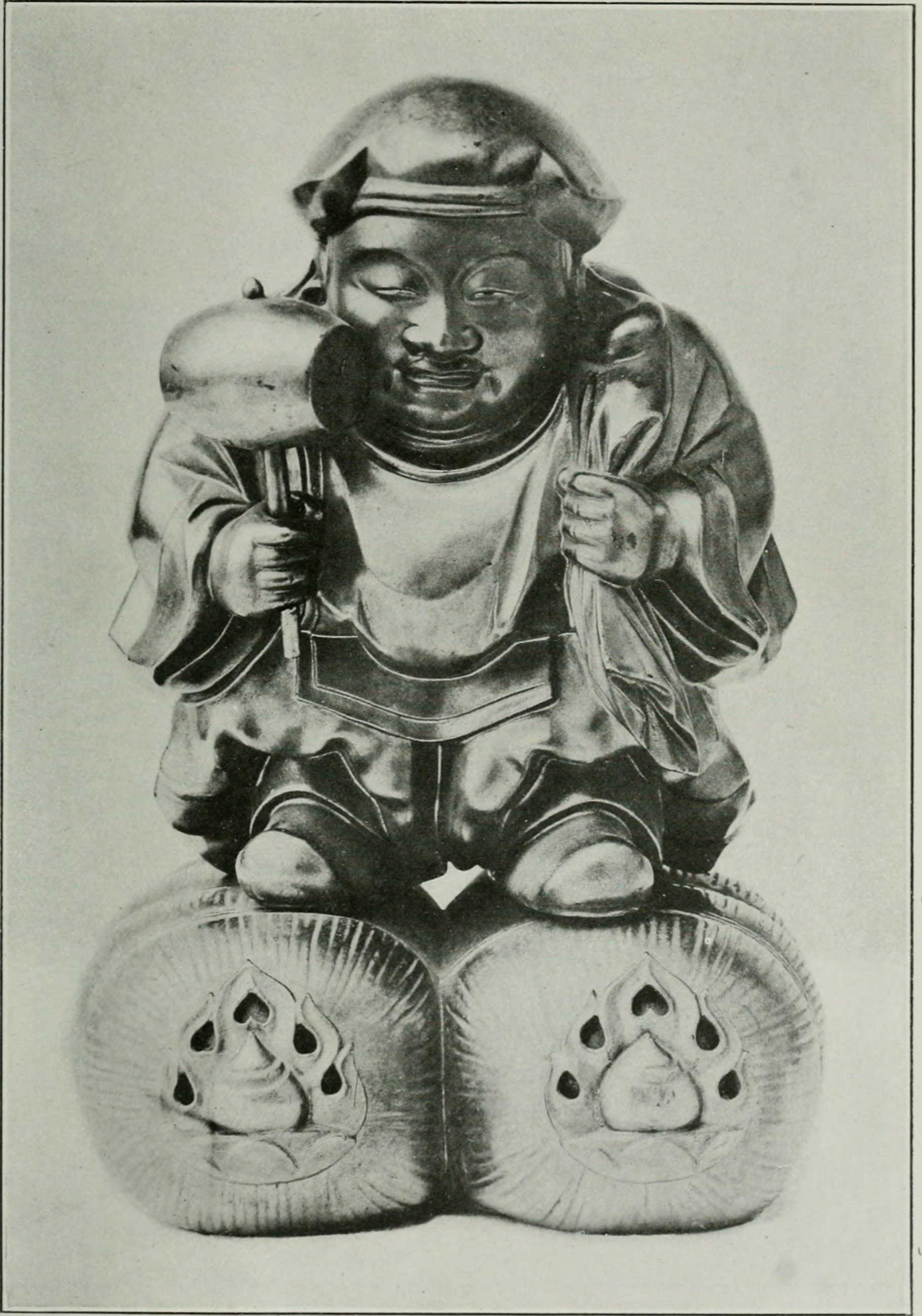
- Other names: Makakara (摩訶迦羅); Makakaraten (摩訶迦羅天); Daikokutenjin (大黒天神); Daikokusonten (大黒尊天); Daikoku-san (大黒さん); Daikoku-sama (大黒様 / 大黒さま)
- Japanese: 大黒天
- Affiliation: Deva; Mahākāla (prototype); Ōkuninushi (conflated with)
- Mantra: Oṃ Mahākālāya svāhā (On Makakyaraya sowaka)
- Animals: mouse or rat
- Symbols: sack, mallet, rice bales

Daikokuten (大黒天; Japanese pronunciation: [dä̀í.kó̞.kɯ̈́, -kɯ̥̈.tè̞ɴ̀]) is a syncretic Japanese deity of fortune, luck and wealth. Daikokuten originated from Mahākāla, the Buddhist Deva (天, Ten) conflated with the native Shinto god Ōkuninushi. He is a patron of farmers, cooks and jobs related to money such as bankers.

== Overview ==
=== Mahākāla in East Asian Buddhism ===
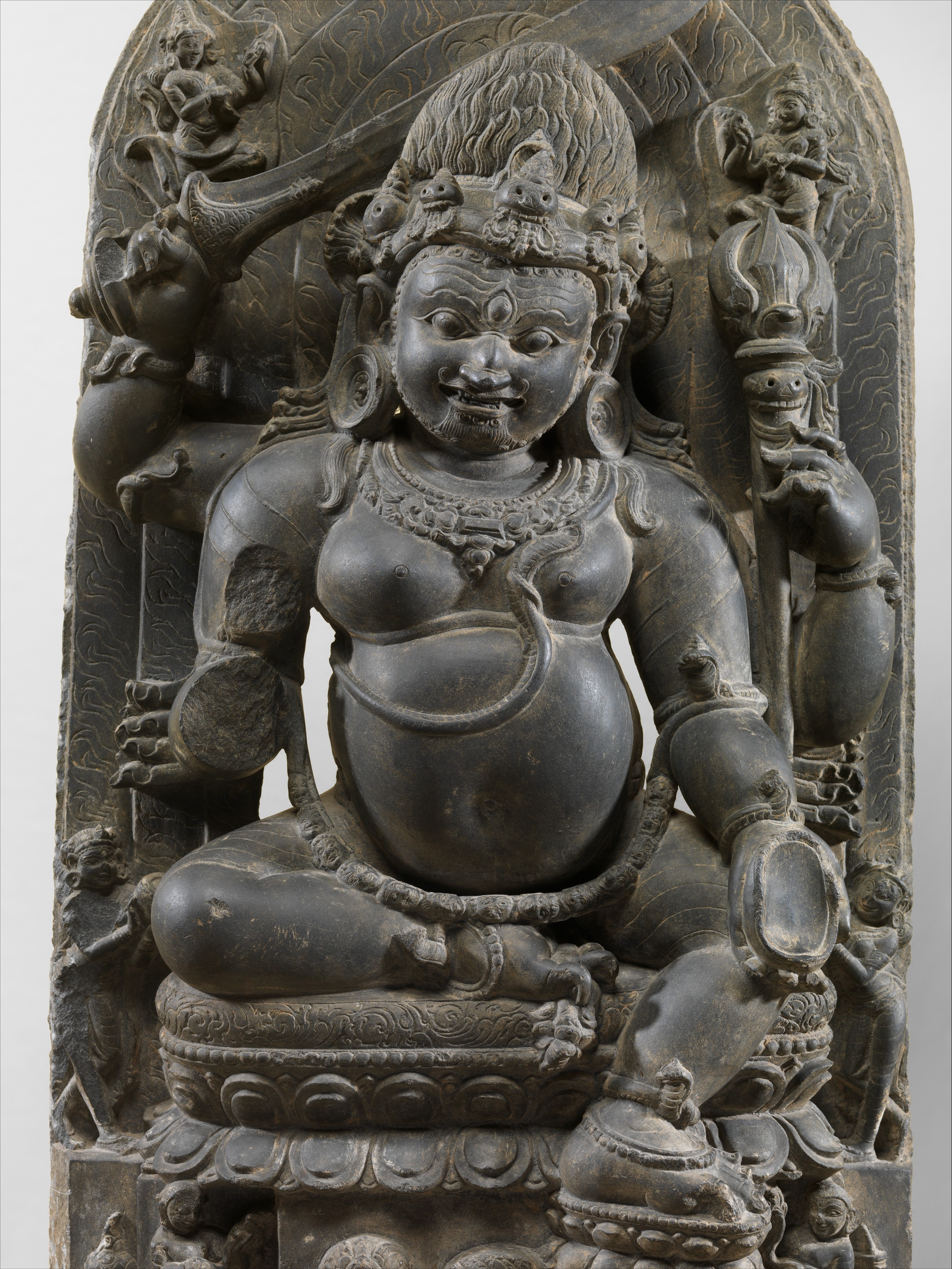
11th–12th century stone stele of Mahākāla from Bihar (Metropolitan Museum of Art)

The Sanskrit term 'Mahākāla' ("Great Black [One]", "Great Time" or "Great Death") was originally one of the epithets of the Hindu god Shiva in his aspect as time (kāla), the ultimate destroyer of all things. This title and aspect of Shiva was eventually adopted by Buddhism, where Mahākāla became reinterpreted as a dharmapāla or a protector of the Buddhist dharma but also as a terrifying deity who roams the forests at night with hordes of ghouls and demons in his train.

Mahākāla is mentioned in many Chinese Buddhist texts, although iconographic depictions of him in China were rare during the Tang and Song periods. He eventually became the center of a flourishing cult after the 9th century in the kingdoms of Nanzhao and Dali in what is now the province of Yunnan, a region bordering Tibet, where his cult was also widespread. Due to Tibetan influence, his importance further increased during the Mongol-led Yuan dynasty, with his likeness being displayed in the imperial palace and in Buddhist temples inside and outside the capital (though most of these images are now no longer extant). The deity's name was both transcribed into Chinese characters as 摩訶迦羅 (Makakara / Makakyara; Middle Chinese (Baxter): ma xa kae la) and translated as 大黑天 (Daikokuten, 'Great Black Deva', with kāla being understood to mean 'black'; MC (Baxter): daj^{H} xok then).

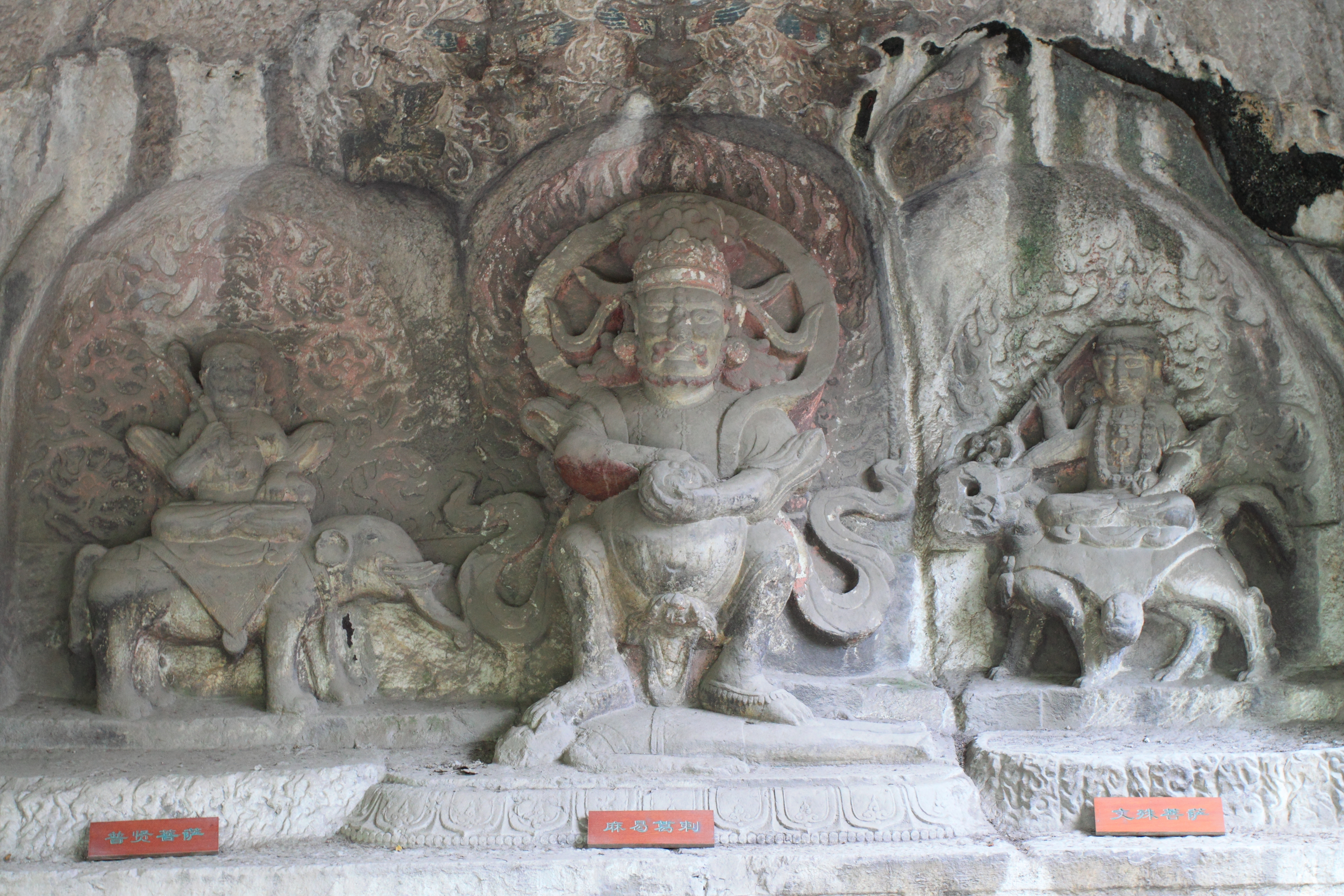
Mahākāla (center) flanked by the bodhisattvas Samantabhadra (left) and Mañjuśrī (right). Baocheng Temple, Hangzhou, Zhejiang, China

In some texts, Mahākāla is described as a fearsome god, a "demon who steals the vital essence (of people)" and who feeds on flesh and blood, though he is also said to only devour those who committed sins against the Three Jewels of Buddhism. One story found in the Tang-era monk Yi Xing's commentary on the Mahāvairocana Tantra portrays Mahākāla as a manifestation of the buddha Vairocana who subjugated the ḍākinīs, a race of flesh-eating female demons, by swallowing them. Mahākāla released them on the condition that they no longer kill humans, decreeing that they could only eat the heart – believed to contain the vital essence of humans known as 'human yellow' (人黄, jin'ō) – of those who were near death. A tale found in Amoghavajra's translation of the Humane King Sūtra relates how a heterodox (i.e. non-Buddhist) master instructed Prince Kalmāṣapāda (斑足王) to offer the heads of a thousand kings to Mahākāla, the "great black god of the graveyard" (塚間摩訶迦羅大黑天神), if he wished to ascend the throne of his kingdom.

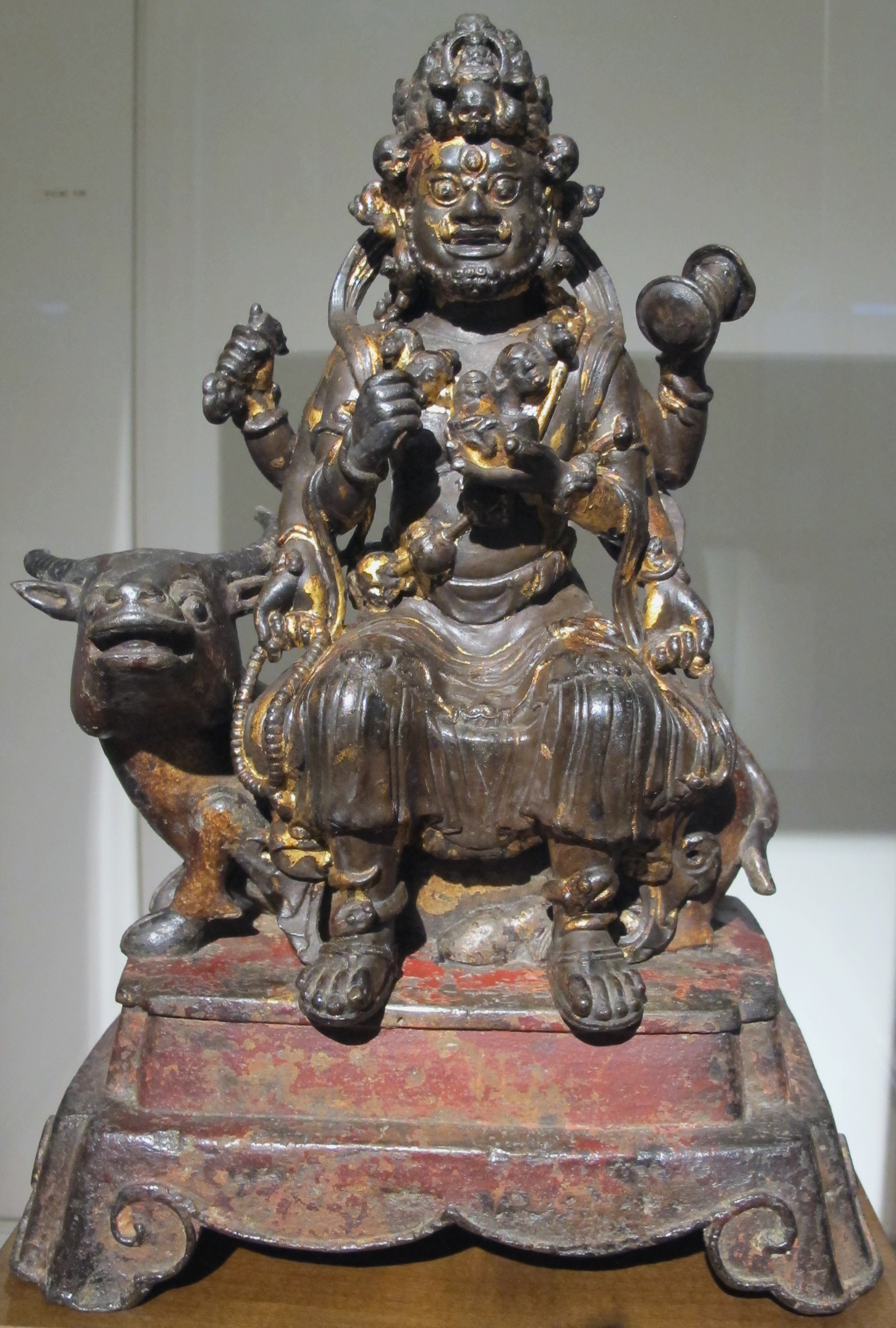
Ming dynasty statue of Dàhēitiān. Sichuan, China. 14th century (with pedestal from the 16th century)

As time went by, Mahākāla also became seen as a guardian of Buddhist monasteries, especially its kitchens. The monk Yijing, who traveled to Srivijaya and India during the late 7th century, claimed that images of Mahākāla were to be found in the kitchens and porches of Indian Buddhist monasteries, before which offerings of food were made:

There is likewise in great monasteries in India, at the side of a pillar in the kitchen, or before the porch, a figure of a deity carved in wood, two or three feet high, holding a golden bag, and seated on a small chair, with one foot hanging down towards the ground. Being always wiped with oil its countenance is blackened, and the deity is called Mahākāla [莫訶哥羅, Bakukakara, MC (Baxter): mak xa ka la] or the great black deity [大黑神, Daikokushin, MC (Baxter): daj^{H} xok zyin]. The ancient tradition asserts that he belonged to the beings (in the heaven) of the great god (or Maheśvara). He naturally loves the Three Jewels, and protects the five assemblies from misfortune. Those who offer prayers to him have their desires fulfilled. At meal-times those who serve in the kitchen offer light and incense, and arrange all kinds of prepared food before the deity. (...) In China the image of that deity has often been found in the districts of Kiang-nan, though not in Huai-poh. Those who ask him (for a boon) find their wishes fulfilled. The efficacy of that deity is undeniable.

Yijing then relates an anecdote about how the deity once miraculously provided food for five hundred monks who came to visit the monastery of Makuṭabandhana in Kushinagar after one of the female servants prayed and made offerings before his image. This idea of Mahākāla as one who brought prosperity to monasteries and granted wishes may have contributed to the identification of the deity as a god of wealth and fortune in Japan.

In China, the god was also associated with fertility and sexuality: during the Qixi Festival (a.k.a. the Double Seventh Festival) held on the 7th day of the 7th month of the Chinese calendar, married women traditionally bought dolls or figurines called 'Móhéluó' (魔合羅) or 'Móhóuluó' (摩睺羅) – the term probably deriving from 'Mahākāla' – in the hopes of giving birth to a child. Ritual texts also prescribe the worship of Mahākāla to women looking for a male partner or to pregnant women.

=== Transformation in Japan ===
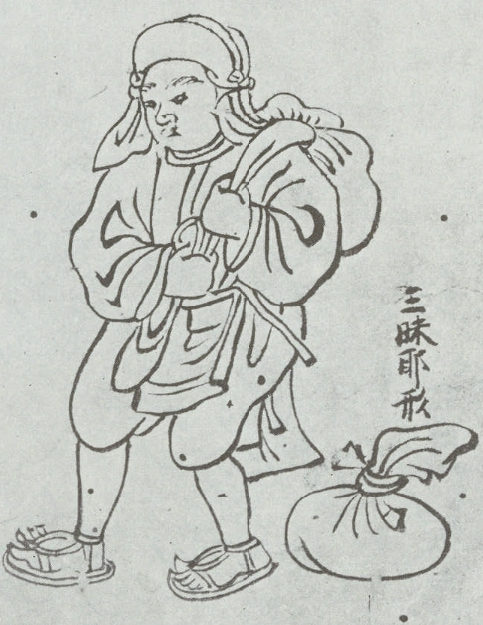
Daikokuten (from the Besson Zakki)

Upon being introduced to Japan via the esoteric Tendai and Shingon sects, Mahākāla (as 'Daikokuten') gradually transformed into a jovial, beneficent figure as his positive qualities (such as being the purveyor of wealth and fertility) increasingly came to the fore – mostly at the expense of his darker traits. Whereas earlier images of Daikokuten showed him as wrathful (or at least stern-faced), later artworks consistently came to portray him as smiling.

Saichō, the founder of the Tendai school, is credited with bringing the cult of Mahākāla-Daikokuten to Japan. Legend claims that when he first climbed Mount Hiei (located northeast of Kyoto), Mahākāla appeared to him in the form of an old man and offered to become the guardian of the monastic community envisioned by Saichō, what would become known as Enryaku-ji.

By the medieval period, when Buddhism and native Japanese beliefs (Shinto) were becoming syncretized, Daikokuten became conflated with the native kami Ōkuninushi (大国主), as the first two characters of the latter's name (大国) can also be read as 'Daikoku'. Daikokuten's status as patron of Enryaku-ji also influenced this connection: he was identified with Sannō Gongen, the deity enshrined in Hiyoshi Taisha at the eastern foot of Mount Hiei, who in turn was identified with Ōkuninushi or Ōmononushi (Miwa Myōjin, the god of Mount Miwa in Nara Prefecture who is also interpreted as Ōkuninushi under another name or an aspect of his).

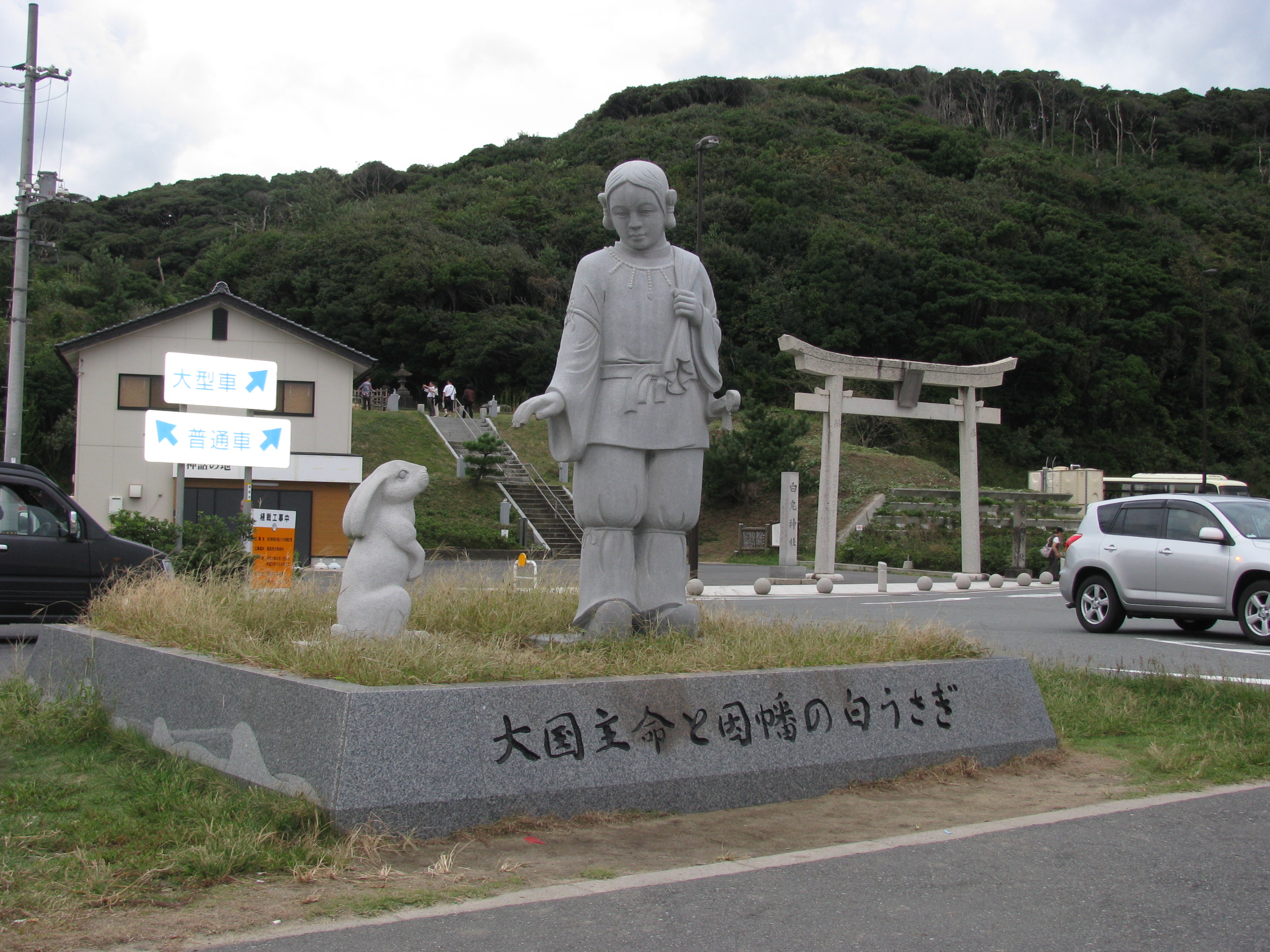
The god Ōkuninushi, bearing a sack, meeting the Hare of Inaba

The sack or bag Daikokuten carries (already attested in Yijing's description of portrayals of Mahākāla in India) served to further associate the god with Ōkuninushi: in the story of the Hare of Inaba (found in the Kojiki), the young Ōkuninushi is said to have originally been treated by his wicked elder brothers as their luggage carrier. Besides the sack, Daikokuten began to acquire other attributes such as the golden mallet called uchide no kozuchi (lit. "tap-appear little mallet", i.e. a mallet that bestows anything that his followers desire such as wealth and happiness when struck on the ground) and two big bales of rice. He was also considered a god of fertility, and was thus also portrayed making the obscene fig sign, carrying a suggestively bifurcated daikon (sometimes called the "bride of Daikoku"), sporting a huge erect penis, or being entirely represented himself by a wooden phallus.

Mice and rats also became a part of Daikokuten's iconography, due to Mahākāla's association with Vaiśravaṇa (Bishamonten in Japanese), the Buddhist analogue to the Hindu Kubera, and Pañcika, Vaiśravaṇa's general and consort of the yakshini goddess Hārītī (known in Japan as Kishimojin), who were both associated with the northern direction – which corresponds to the sign of the Rat in the Chinese zodiac. (One of the twelve dikpālas or guardians of the directions in Buddhism is Īśāna, the guardian of the northeast who, like Mahākāla, is a Buddhicized form of Shiva.) This also contributed to the conflation of Daikokuten with Ōkuninushi, as mice also figured in the latter's mythology.

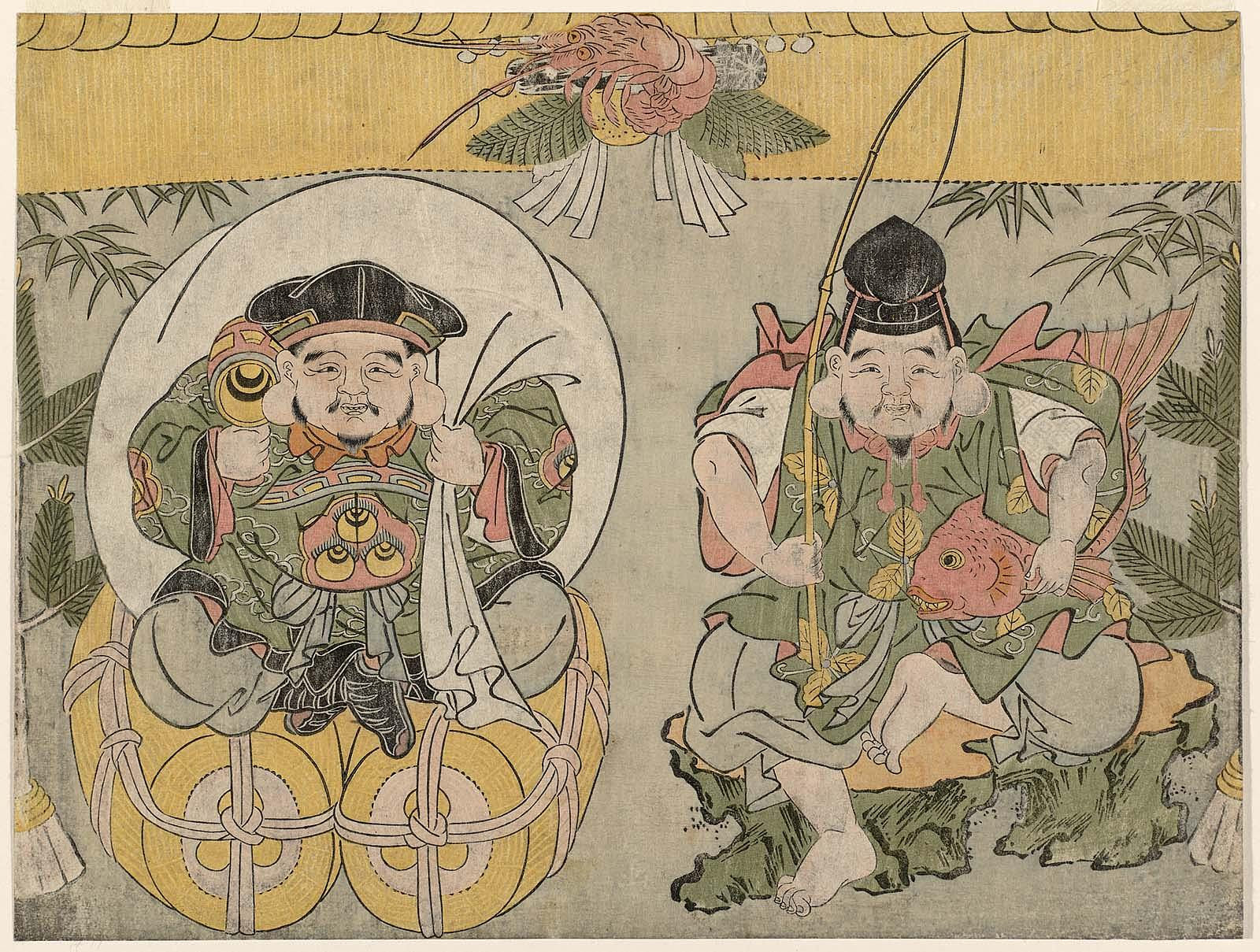
18th century ukiyo-e depicting Daikokuten (left) and Ebisu (right)

Medieval exegetes interpreted Mahākāla-Daikokuten in both a positive and a negative way: on the one hand he was seen as a symbol of fundamental ignorance (expressed by the name 'Daikoku', which can be interpreted as "great darkness"), but on the other hand he also represented the nonduality of ignorance (symbolized by the character 黒, 'black(ness) / dark(ness)') and enlightenment (designated by the character 大, 'great'). He was identified with Ichiji Kinrin (Ekākṣaroṣṇīṣacakra, a manifestation of both the cosmic buddha Vairocana – specifically, Vairocana's head knob or uṣṇīṣa – and the sacred syllable bhrūṃ) and thus a symbol of ultimate reality, but also with the directional deity Īśāna (who as noted earlier was another deity derived from Shiva), who is also considered to be a god of obstacles. Indeed, because of the stigma related to his origins, he was identified in some texts as a jissha (実者, lit. "true/real one", also known as 実類, jitsurui), a 'real' god considered inferior to deities who are provisional manifestations of enlightened buddhas and bodhisattvas (gongen). However, medieval esoteric Buddhism also posited the existence of a 'higher' Daikokuten, the conventional Daikokuten being but one of the various guises he takes. While the latter represented ignorance, the former was seen as transmuting ignorance into awakening.

Daikokuten was also linked or identified with other deities such as Ugajin, Benzaiten (the Buddhist version of Sarasvatī), Vaiśravana-Bishamonten, the earth god Kenrō Jijin (derived from the Indian earth goddess Pṛthivī, though the deity is also portrayed in Japan as male), or the wisdom king Acala (Fudō Myōō in Japanese). Indeed, Acala, like Mahākāla-Daikokuten, is credited in some sources with defeating and converting the ḍākinīs and is also considered to be a wrathful avatar of Vairocana. (Likewise, Acala is also thought by some scholars to be derived in one way or another from Shiva.)

In popular belief, Daikokuten is also commonly paired with the folk deity Ebisu. Just as Daikokuten was conflated with Ōkuninushi, Ebisu was sometimes identified with Ōkuninushi's son Kotoshironushi or the dwarf god Sukunabikona, who assisted Ōkuninushi in developing the land of Japan. In homes, the two deities were enshrined in the kitchen or oven, while merchants worshiped them as patron deities of commercial success. Farmers meanwhile revered them as gods of the rice paddy (ta-no-kami).

== Iconography ==
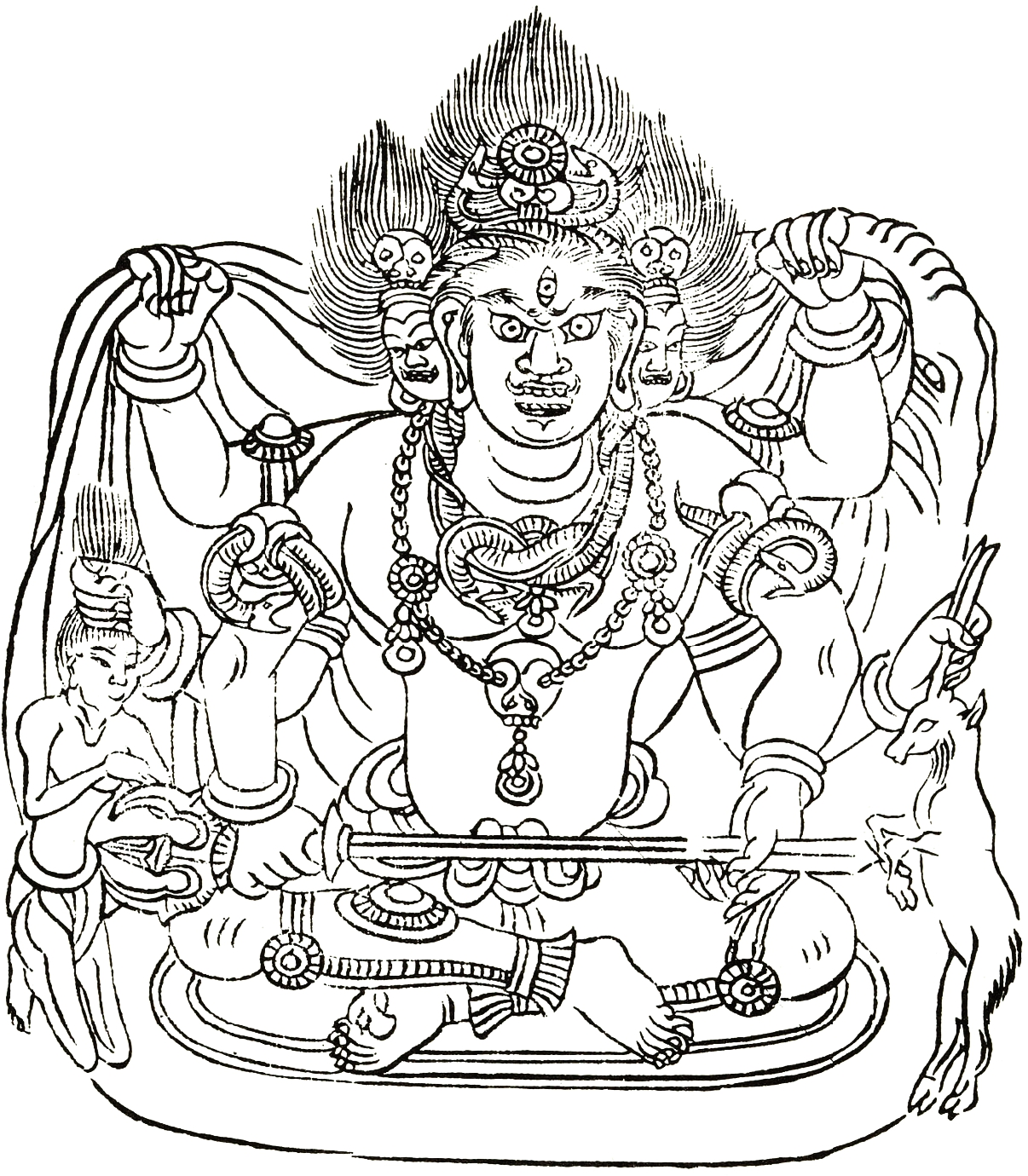
Mahākāla as depicted in the Womb Realm (Garbhadhātu) Maṇḍala, holding an elephant hide, a sword, a human and a goat

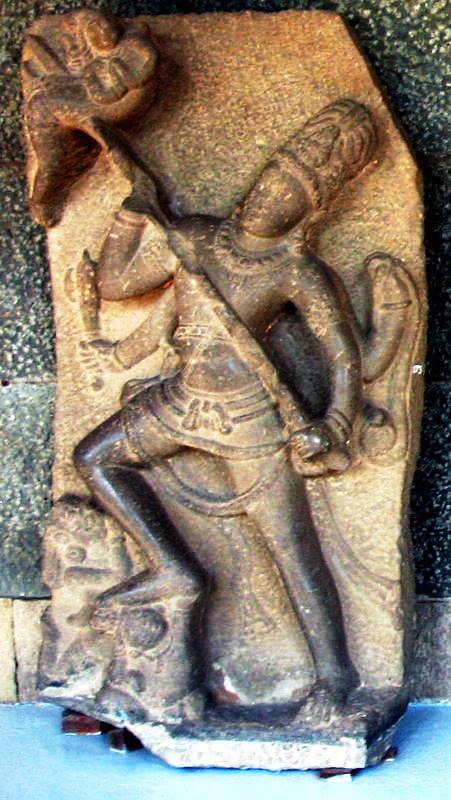
The iconography of the Buddhist Mahākāla is thought to be based on the mythic episode of Shiva spearing the demon Andhaka with his trident. Note the elephant hide (the skin of Gajāsura, whom Shiva also defeated) in one of his arms.

Mahākāla was originally represented in East Asian Buddhist art as a dark-skinned wrathful deity wearing a diadem and a necklace of skulls, with snakes coiled around his neck and arms. One iconographic type portrays him with three heads and six arms, holding a flayed elephant skin with his upper hands, a trident or a sword horizontally with his lower hands, and a human figure and a goat with his middle hands. Many artworks of this type show Mahākāla in a sitting position, though a description of the deity found in the dictionary compiled by the monk Huilin (慧琳) titled The Sound and Meaning of All Sutras (Chinese: 一切經音義, pinyin: Yīqièjīng yīnyì) has him standing on the hands of the earth goddess. The same work describes Mahākāla as having eight arms, holding an elephant skin, a trident, a preta, a goat, a sword, and a khatvāṅga (a skull-topped club or staff). Some images of Mahākāla of this type found in Dunhuang (dating from the 9th-10th centuries) meanwhile show him standing on a snake. Another iconographic variant (not found in Chinese texts but attested in Japan) depicts Mahākāla with one head and two arms, holding a sword in his right hand and a skull cup (kapāla) in his left. He is sometimes also shown as trampling on the elephant-headed deity Vināyaka (the Buddhist analogue to the Hindu Ganesha, though the Buddhist version is sometimes also perceived as a negative figure), another deity Mahākāla is associated with. Indeed, the two deities are shown together in the outer northeast (upper left) corner of the Womb Realm (Garbhadhātu) Maṇḍala, one of the two main maṇḍalas of East Asian esoteric Buddhism.

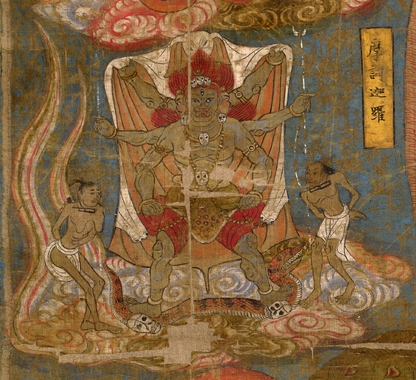
Māhākala holding up an elephant skin and standing on a snake. Detail of a painting found in the Mogao Caves in Dunhuang, Gansu, China

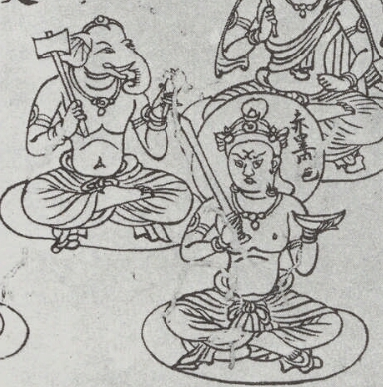
Two-armed Mahākāla (lower right) holding a sword and a skull cup

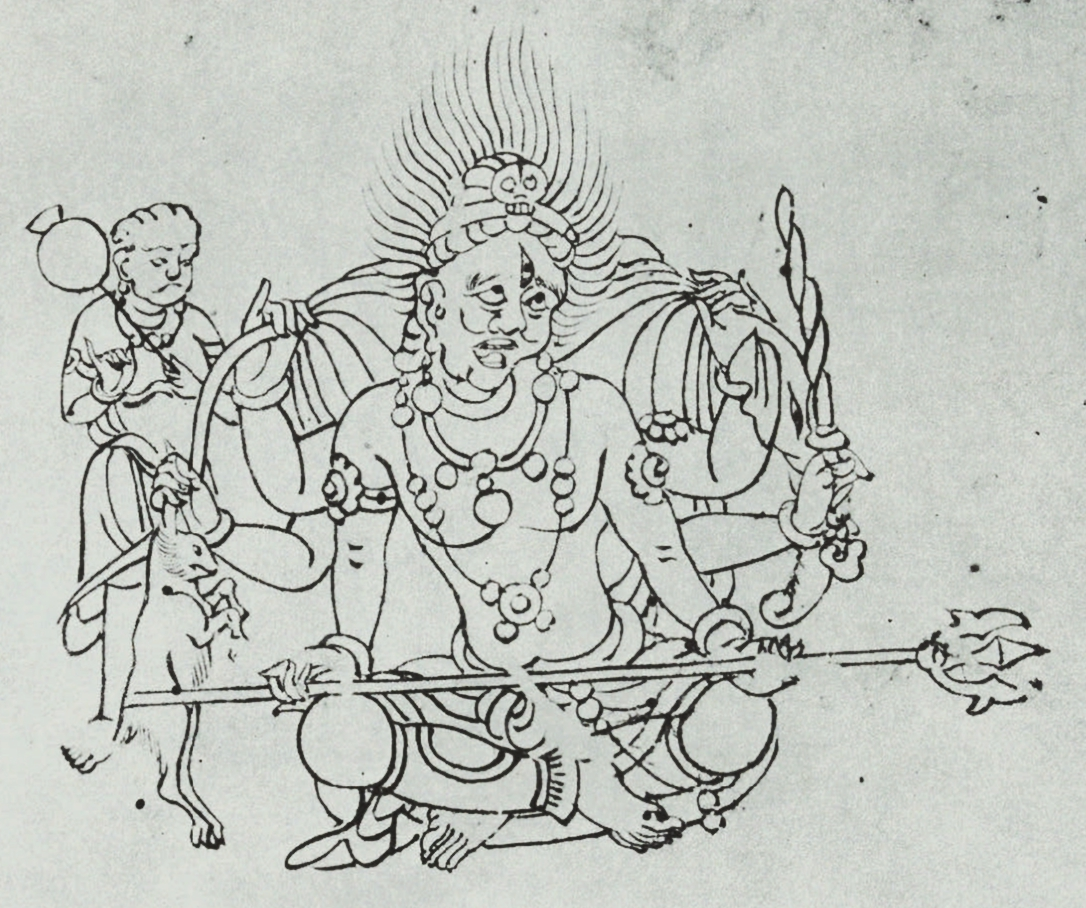
Mahākāla with one head and six arms, from the Besson zakki (別尊雑記), a Japanese compendium of Buddhist iconography

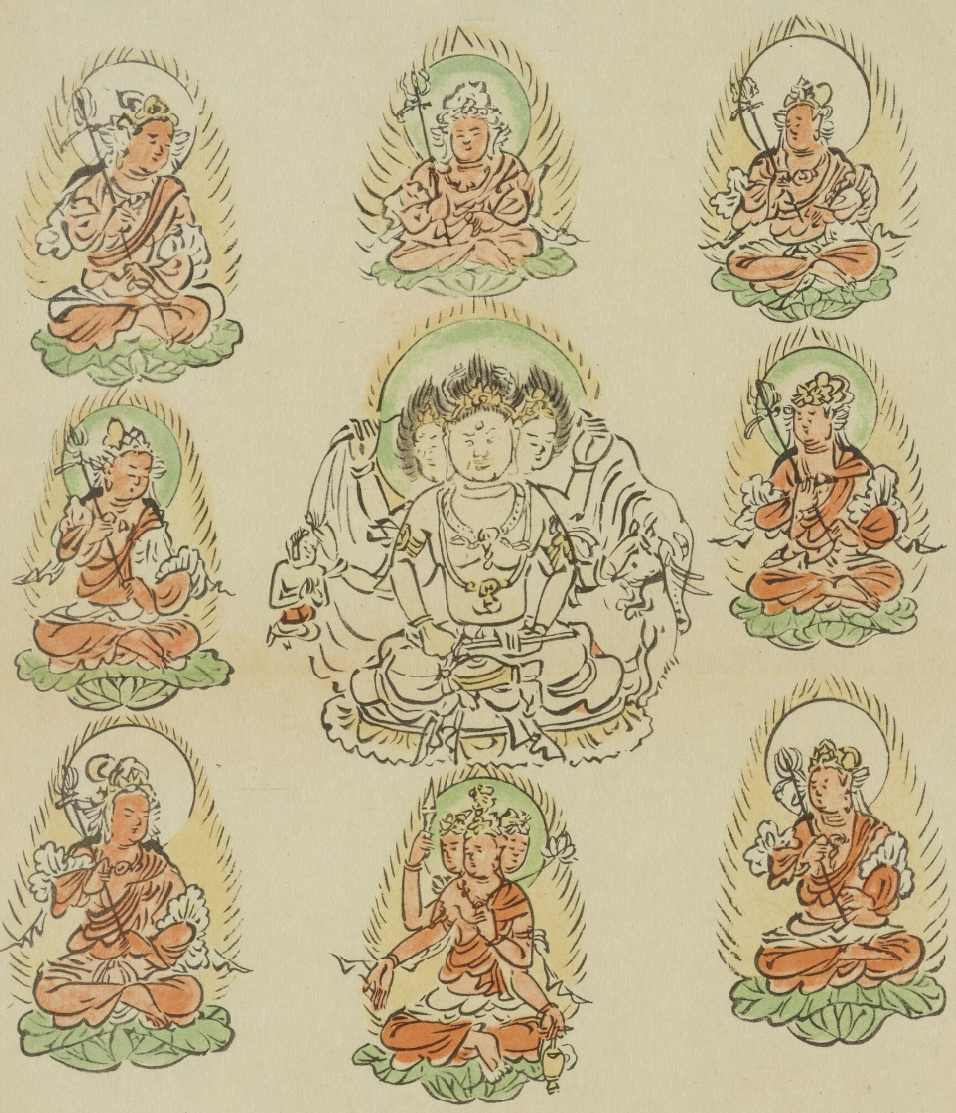
Mandala of Mahākāla and the Aṣṭamātṛkas, from the Kakuzenshō (覚禅鈔), an early Kamakura period iconographic compendium

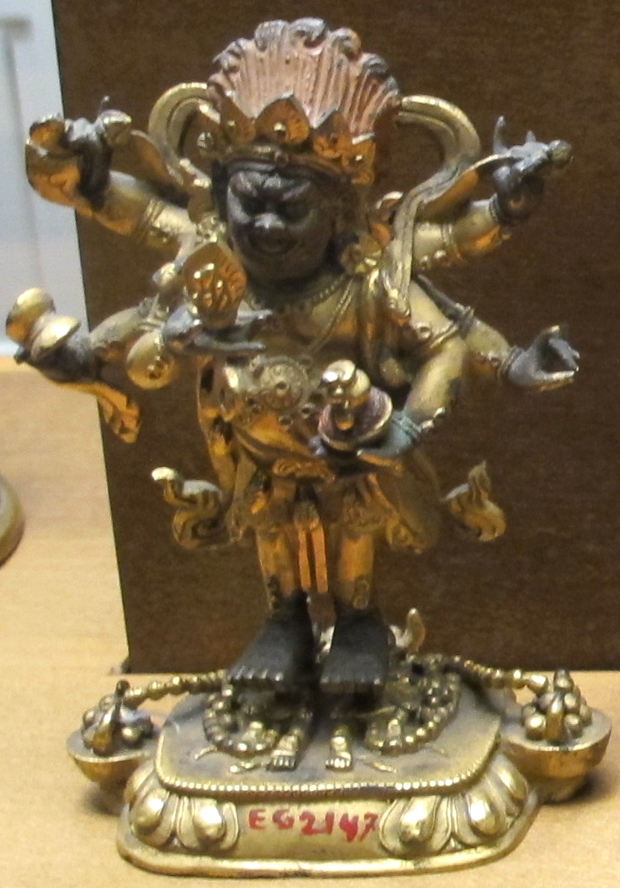
Qing dynasty statuette of Dàhēitiān. China. 17th century.

Yijing describes the statues of Mahākāla he had seen in Indian monasteries as "holding a golden bag and seated on a small chair, with one foot hanging down towards the ground." Some scholars believe that the images Yijing saw may have actually been that of the god Kubera, who was represented in Indian art as carrying a money bag; indeed, he identifies 'Mahākāla' as being part of the retinue of the "great god" (大天, i.e. Mahādeva / Maheśvara). It is thought that the two gods may have been conflated at some point; images of both deities are commonly found guarding the entrances of temples in India, Nepal and other places influenced by Hindu-Buddhist culture, and Kubera was, as mentioned, closely associated with Shiva. The image of the sack-carrying Daikokuten that would become the standard in Japan is thus thought to be derived from Kubera's iconography.

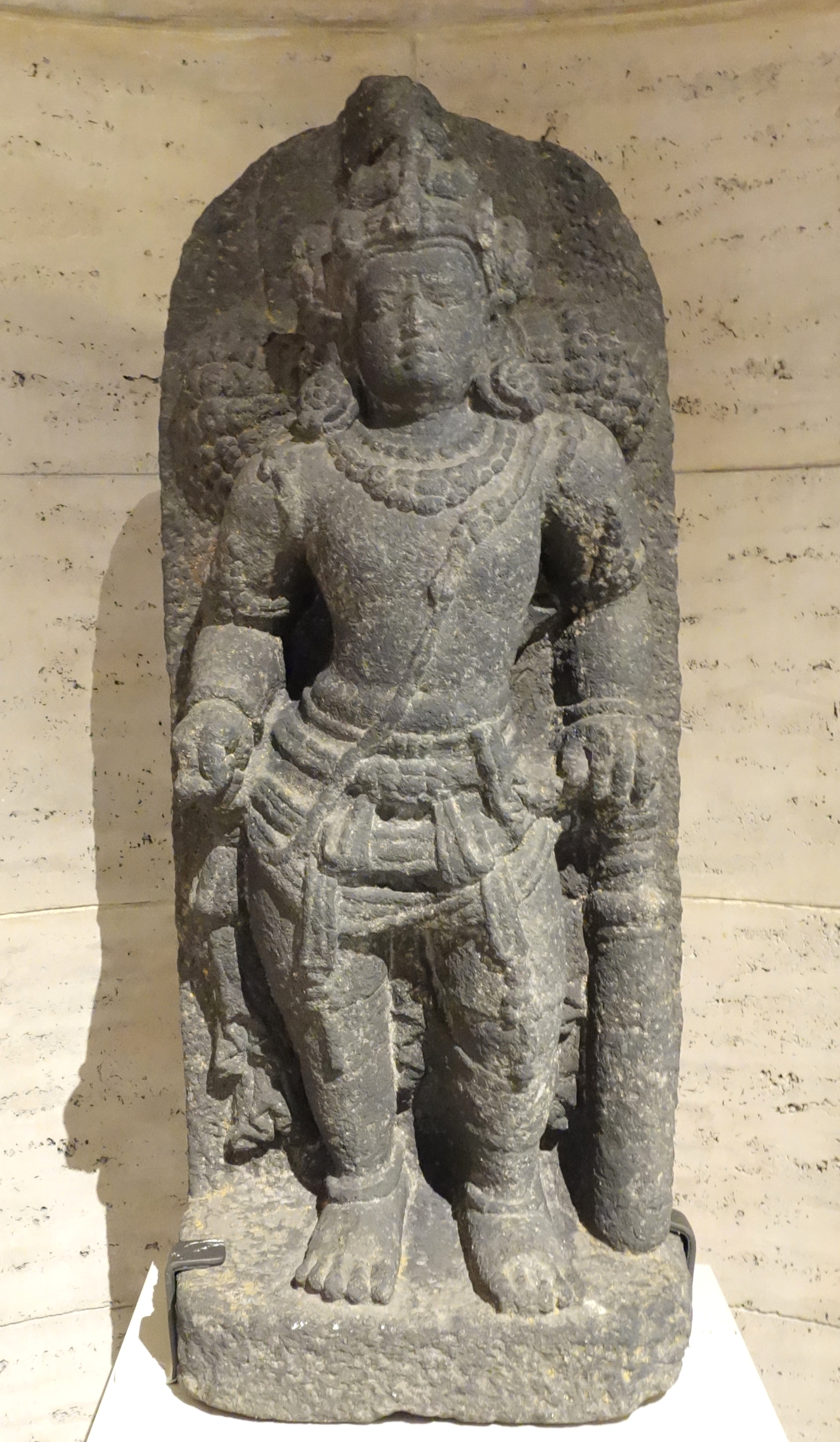
Stone sculpture of Mahākāla (one of a pair of door guardians), from Central Java, Indonesia

The earliest Japanese representations of Mahākāla-Daikokuten can be classified into two types: one (associated with the Shingon school) shows the deity standing, his left hand holding a sack slung over his shoulder, with his right hand clenched into a fist and resting on the right hip, while the other (associated with the Tendai school) depicts him as sitting. Most of these images show Daikokuten wearing Japanese clothing, though a few has him wearing armor. The standing portrayal is first mentioned in the 10th-century Shingon work Yōson dōjōkan (要尊道場観, 'Visualizations of the Ritual Spheres of the Essential Deities') and an apocryphal 11th-century text titled Daikokutenjin-hō (大黒天神法, 'The Tantra of Mahākāla'), while the seated portrayal's first literary appearance is in the 13th-century Asabashō (阿娑縛抄), a Tendai iconographical and ritual compendium. The Daikokutenjin-hō describes Daikokuten as black in color, wearing eboshi (烏帽子, a black cap worn by Japanese noblemen), kariginu (狩衣, informal aristocratic outerwear), and hakama (loose, skirt-like trousers), with his right fist resting at his waist and his left hand clutching a large bag, the color of which is that of rat's hair.

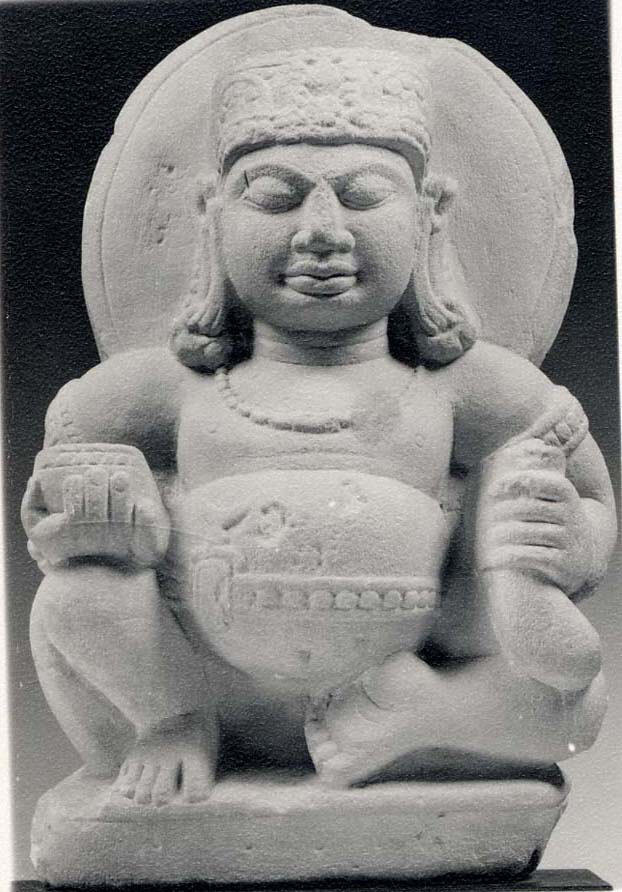
Kubera holding a money bag in his left hand and a bowl in the other, with one foot in the ground

The oldest surviving examples of the two iconographic variants date from around the 11th century (late Heian period). The oldest standing Daikokuten statue is found in Kanzeon-ji in Dazaifu, Fukuoka Prefecture and depicts him wearing eboshi, knee-length hakama, and shoes. The oldest depiction of the sitting Daikokuten, kept in Kongōrin-ji in Echi District, Shiga Prefecture, meanwhile, shows him wearing armor, seated on a rock and holding a small bag and a club or staff.

Daikokuten's iconography evolved during the 14th century onwards, when he increasingly became portrayed as a smiling man with a rotund belly, holding a mallet and standing or sitting on rice bales. The origin of the mallet attribute is uncertain, although Bernard Faure (2015) links it with Mahākāla-Daikokuten's association with the cult of the Saptamātṛkas (the 'Seven Mothers'), who are pictured as holding mallets – symbolizing their role as plague deities – in the Madarijin (摩怛哩神) ritual. During the 16th century (late Muromachi period), the three deities Daikokuten, Vaiśravaṇa-Bishamonten and Sarasvatī-Benzaiten were fused together into the three-headed 'Sanmen Daikokuten' (三面大黒天, lit. "Three-Faced Daikokuten"), which in a way 'reconnected' the deity's popular benign form with his less well-known wrathful form. This form was eventually introduced in later variants of the legend of Daikokuten's apparition to Saichō in Mount Hiei: in response to Saichō's dilemma over how to provide daily sustenance for three thousand monks, the god is now said to have shown himself to the latter with three faces and six arms.

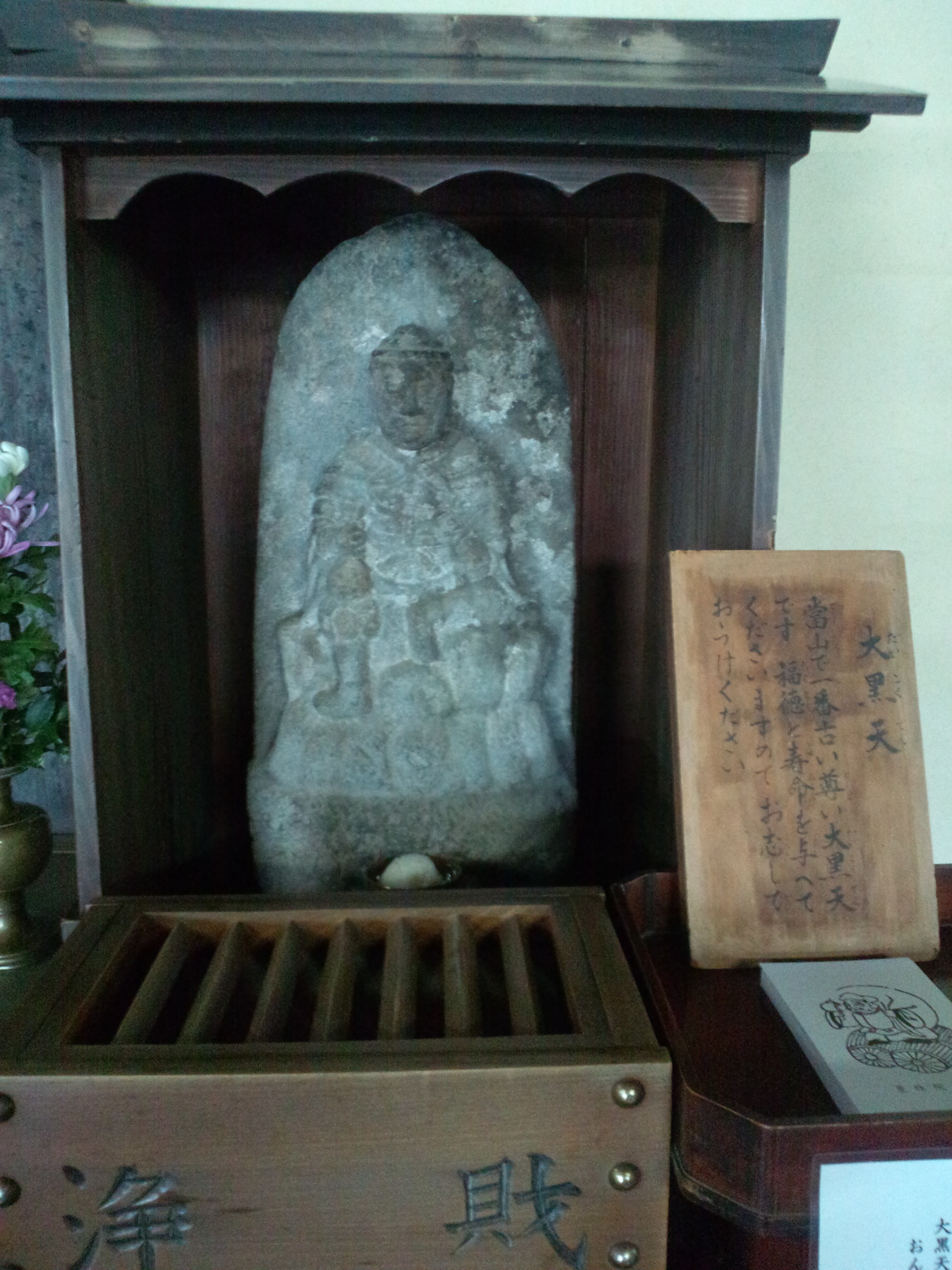
Armored Daikokuten at Manshu-in in Kyoto

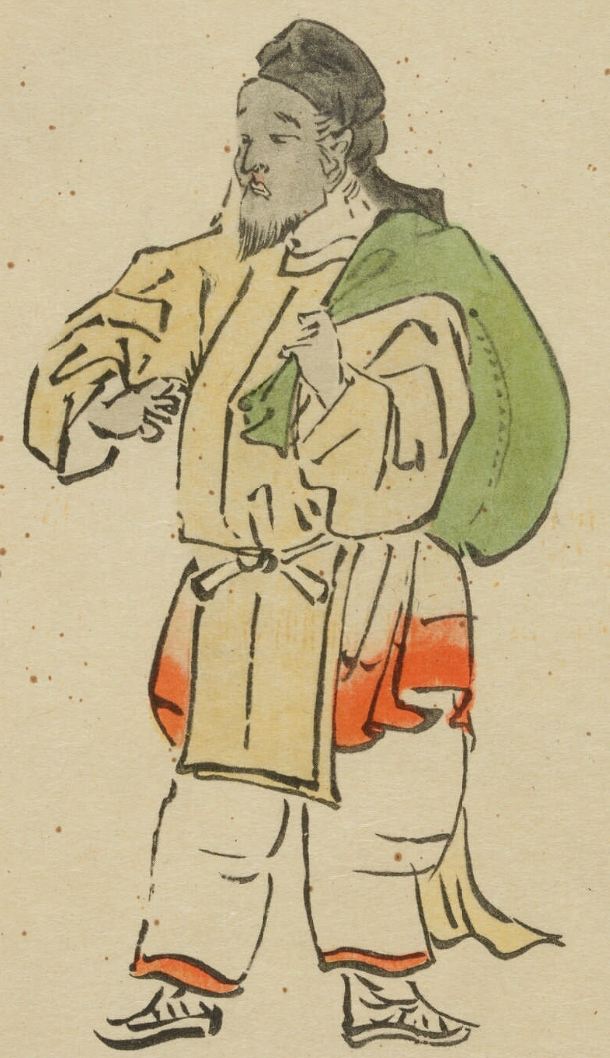
Daikokuten, from the Kakuzenshō

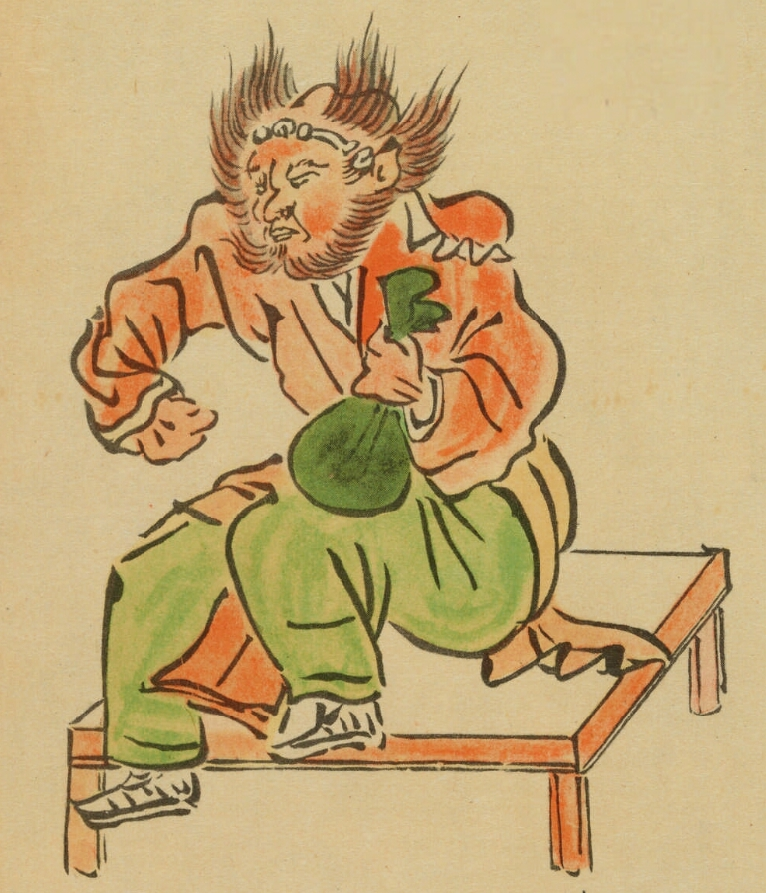
Sitting Daikokuten, from the Kakuzenshō

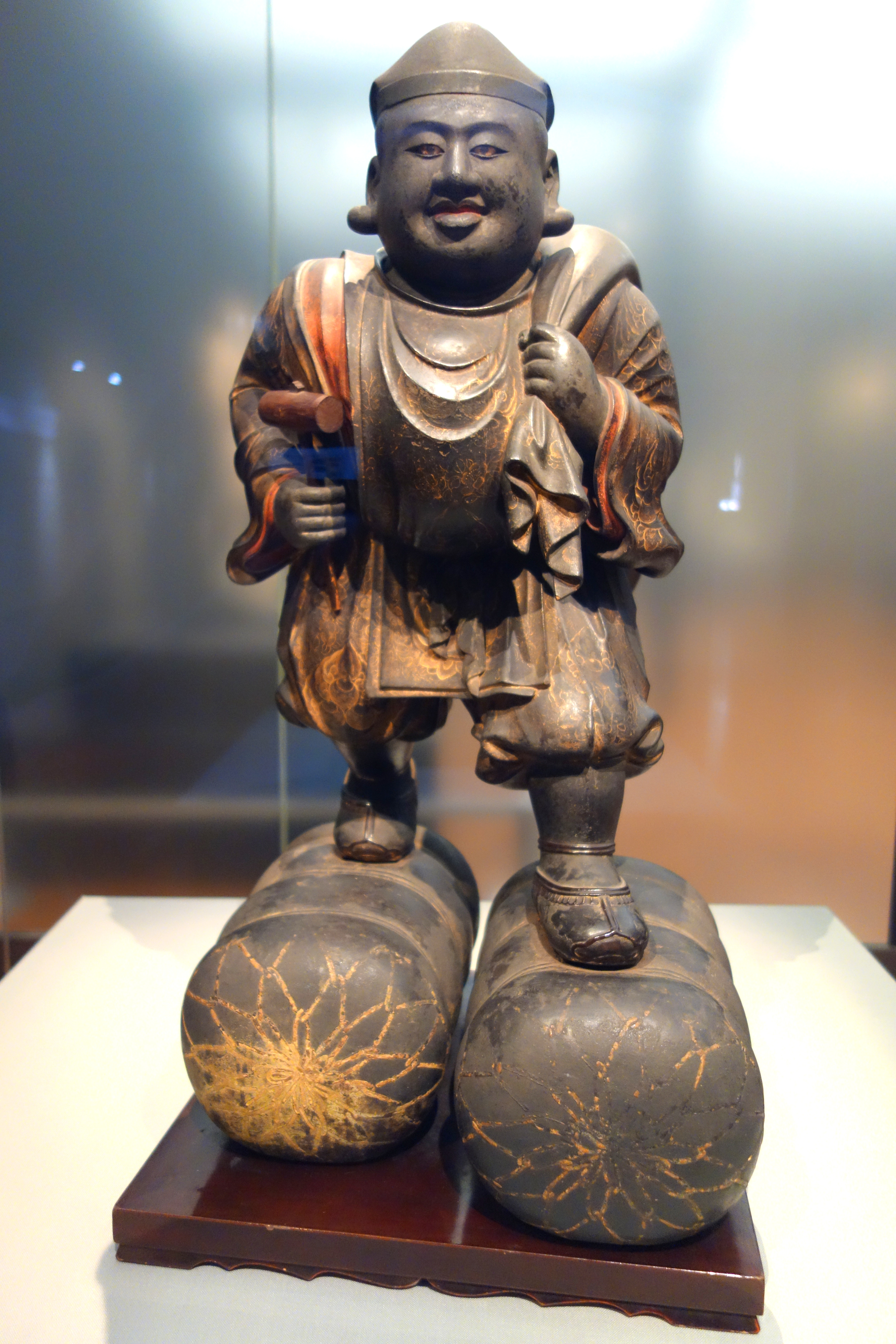
Statue of Daikokuten from Tōdai-ji, dated 1347 (Jōwa 3, Nanbokucho period); currently at the Tokyo National Museum

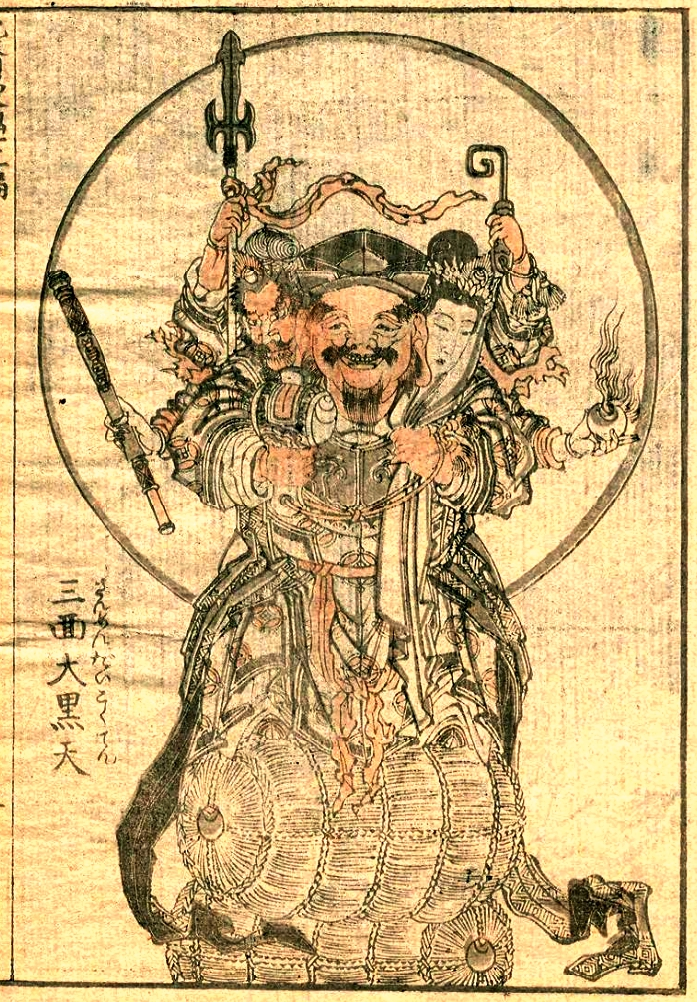
Sanmen Daikokuten, a fusion of Daikokuten (center), Bishamonten (left), and Benzaiten (right), by Katsushika Hokusai

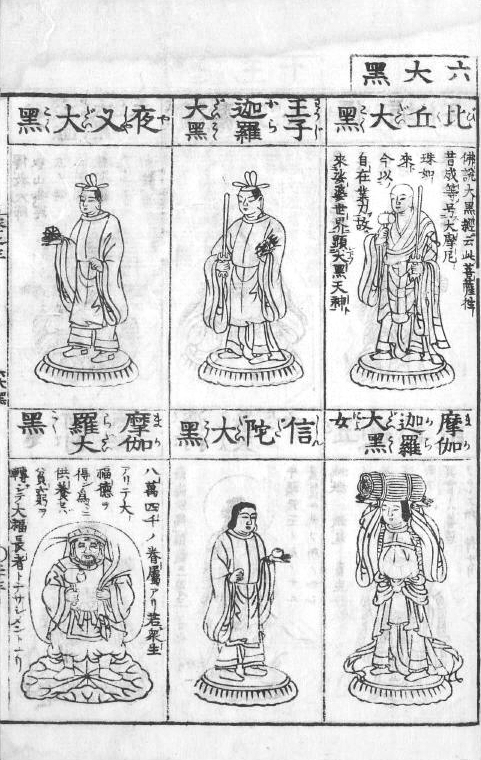
Roku Daikoku, from the Butsuzō Zui

An iconographic grouping known as the 'Roku Daikoku' (六大黒天, lit. "Six Daikoku") also developed during the same period, showing the deity in six different forms:

1. Biku Daikoku (比丘大黒): Daikokuten in the form of a Buddhist monk (bhikkhu), holding a mallet in his right hand and a sword in his left
2. Ōji Kara Daikoku (王子迦羅大黒): Daikokuten as a prince (王子, ōji) brandishing a sword and a vajra; sometimes interpreted as Mahākāla-Daikokuten's son
3. Yasha Daikoku (夜叉大黒): Daikokuten as the subduer of demons (yakṣa), wearing Japanese aristocratic garb and holding a wheel (dharmacakra) in his right hand
4. Makakara Daikokunyo (摩伽迦羅大黒女): Daikokuten as a female figure holding a bale of rice above her head; sometimes interpreted as Mahākāla-Daikokuten's consort (i.e. Mahākāḷī)
5. Shinda Daikoku (信陀大黒 or 真陀大黒): Daikokuten as a boy with the wish-granting jewel (cintāmaṇi) in his hand
6. Makara Daikoku (摩伽羅大黒): Daikokuten in his 'regular' benign form, holding a mallet and a sack

The 17th-18th centuries (Edo period) marked the appearance of the cult of the Seven Lucky Gods (Shichifukujin), of which Daikokuten is a key member. Daikokuten's rise in popularity among the common people during the late medieval and early modern periods led to the god becoming a popular subject in art.

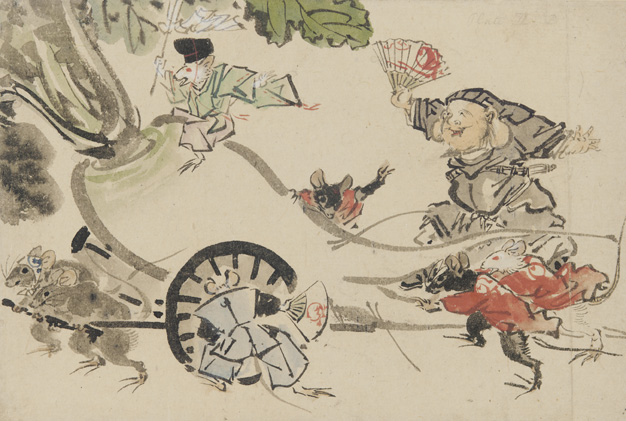
Daikokuten with rats pulling a radish mikoshi, by Kawanabe Kyōsai

Ebisu and Daikokuten, by Tamagawa Shūchō

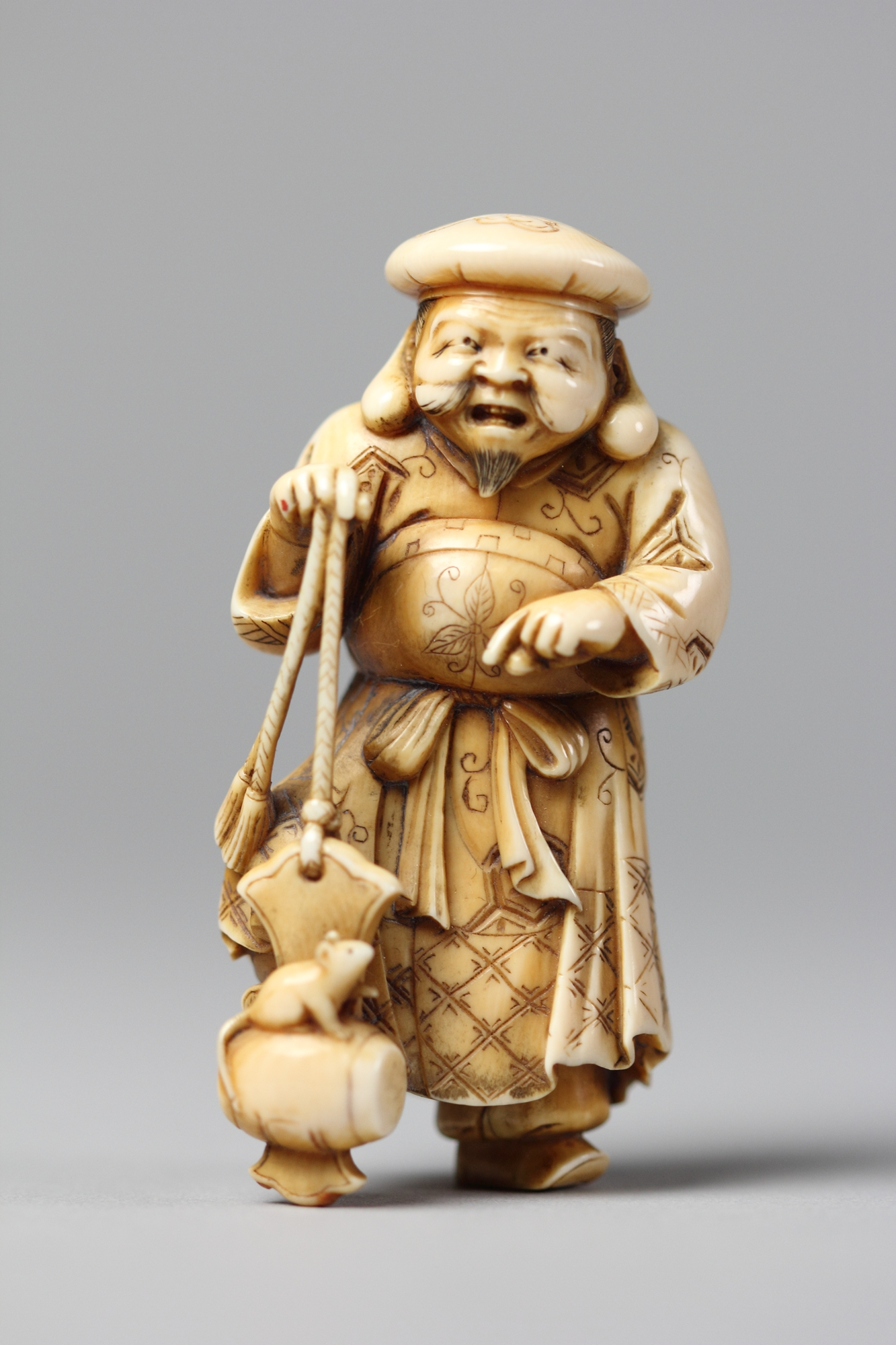
Ivory netsuke of Daikokuten with mallet and rat

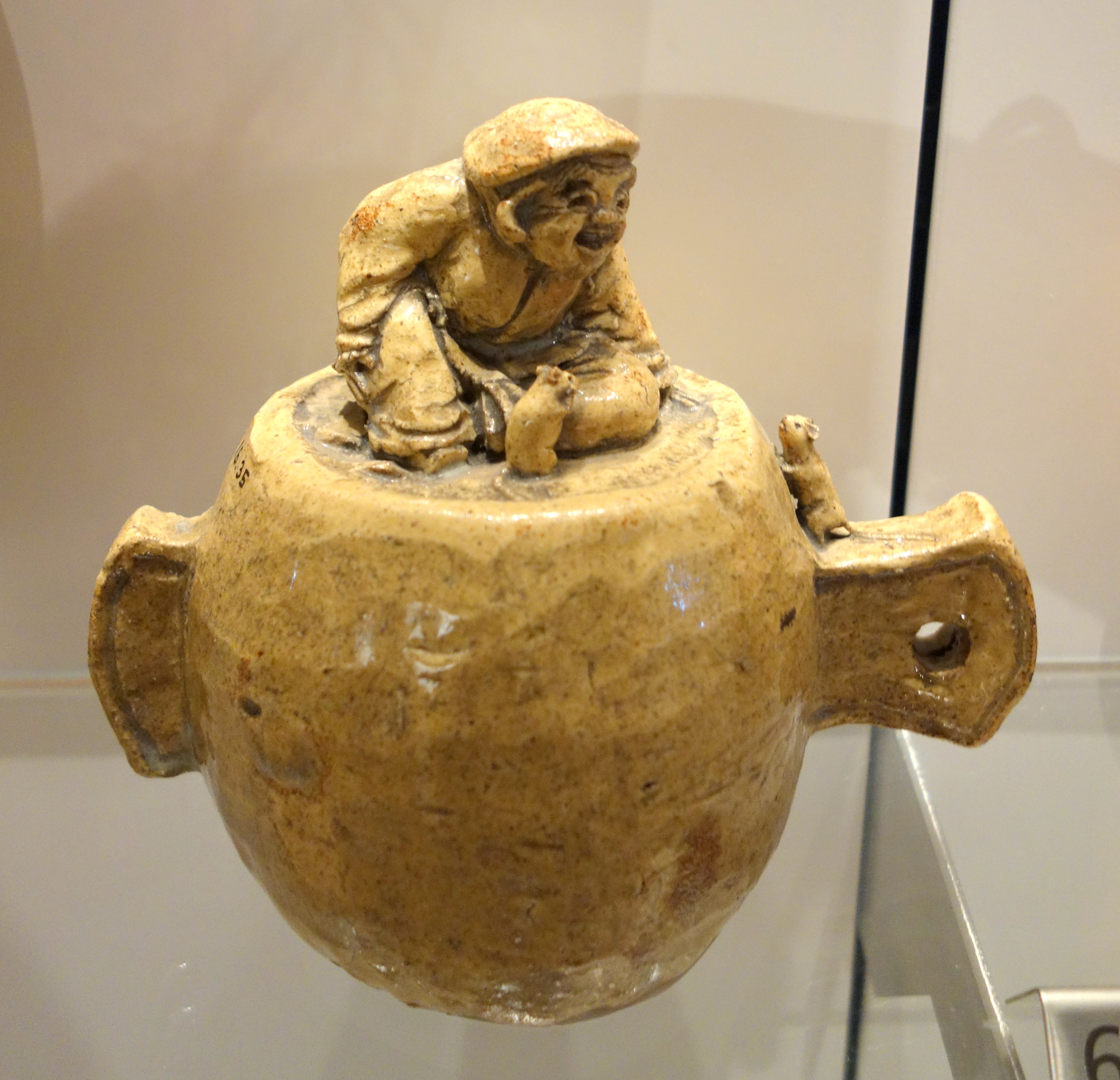
Okimono in the shape of Daikokuten's hammer

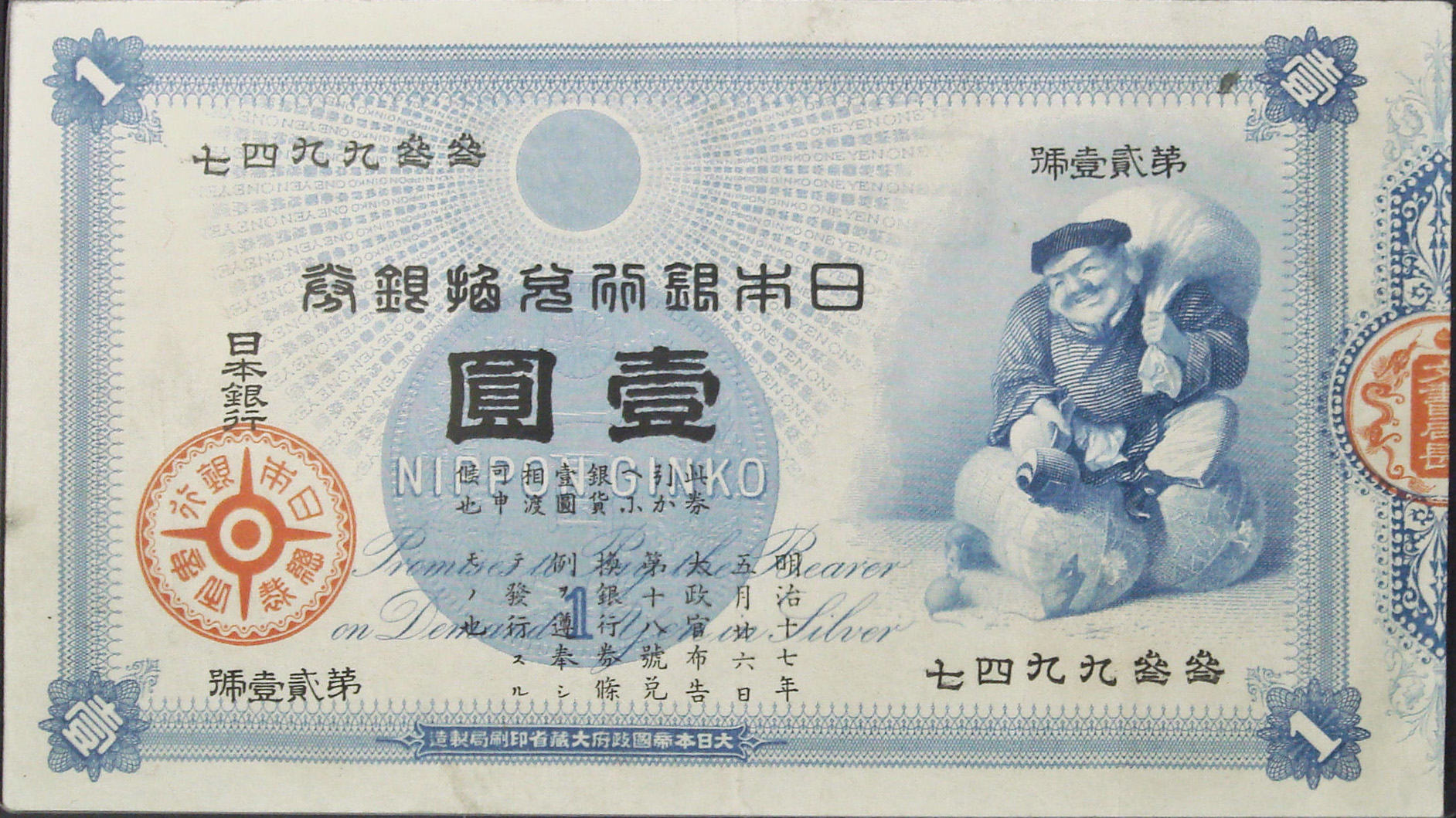
Meiji-era 1 yen banknote featuring Daikokuten, by Italian engraver Edoardo Chiossone

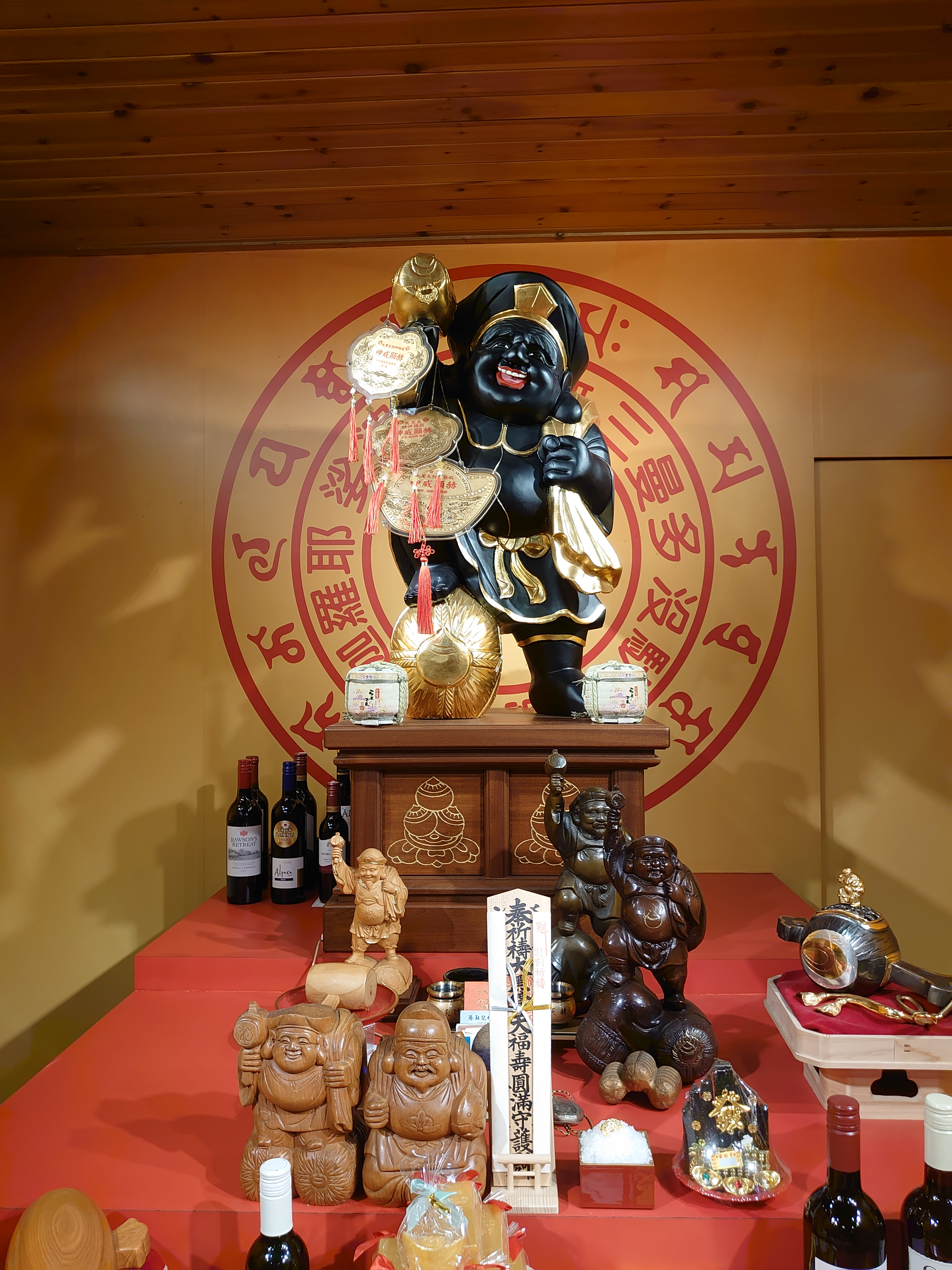
Statue of Daikokuten in Taipei

== Worship ==
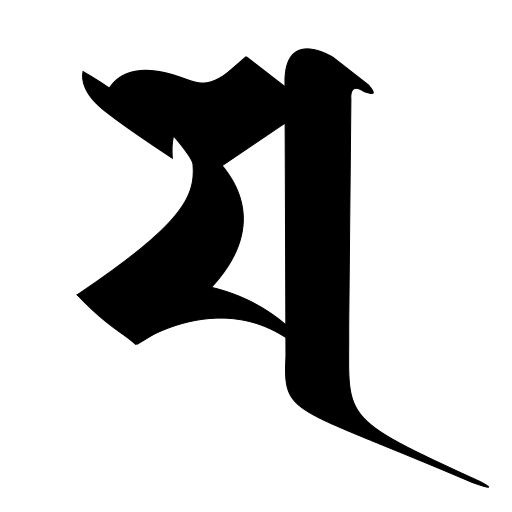
म (ma), Mahākāla's seed syllable (bīja) in Siddhaṃ script

The god continues to enjoy an exalted position as a deity of fortune and the household in Japan. He is worshipped in the kitchen for the blessing of the five cereals which includes wheat and rice. Images of Daikokuten can be found in both Buddhist temples and Shinto shrines in the country (a relic of the long-standing fusion of the two religions), though in the latter case, these are usually interpreted and revered as representations of the Japanese god Ōkuninushi rather than the Buddhist Mahākāla.

Due to his association with rats, days under the zodiac sign of the Rat (子日, ne-no-hi), especially that of the Yang Wood Rat (甲子, kōshi / kinoe-ne) are considered to be sacred to Mahākāla-Daikokuten (and by extension, Ōkuninushi), with the first (初甲子, hatsu kōshi) and last kōshi days (納め甲子, osame kōshi) of a given year being especially held in great esteem. Special ceremonies and festivals are held on these days at many places of worship dedicated to the deity.

During the early modern period, Daikokuten's association with wealth and prosperity precipitated a custom known as fukunusubi, or "theft of fortune". This custom started with the belief that whoever stole divine figures was assured of good fortune if not caught in the act. The toshi-no-ichi (year-end market) held at Sensō-ji in Asakusa became the main venue of the sale and disposal of such images by the fortune-seekers. Many small stalls were opened where articles including images of Daikokuten were sold on the eve of New Year celebrations. Another practice known as tsubute (礫, lit. "stone throwing") involved 'stealing' the wealth from a rich house by throwing into it a Daikokuten talisman at the hour of the rat (around midnight).

An esoteric ritual performed in many Tendai temples where Daikokuten is worshiped known as yokubei-ku (浴餅供, lit. "glutinous rice bath") involves pouring rice porridge over a statue of the deity.

=== Bījā and mantra ===
The bīja or seed syllable used to represent Mahākāla-Daikokuten in Japanese esoteric Buddhism is ma (म), written in Siddhaṃ script. Mahākāla's mantra meanwhile is as follows:

Sanskrit	Japanese (romanized)	Chinese characters	Hiragana
Oṃ Mahākālāya svāhā	On Makakyaraya sowaka	唵 摩訶迦羅耶 娑婆訶	おん まかきゃらや そわか

=== Temples ===
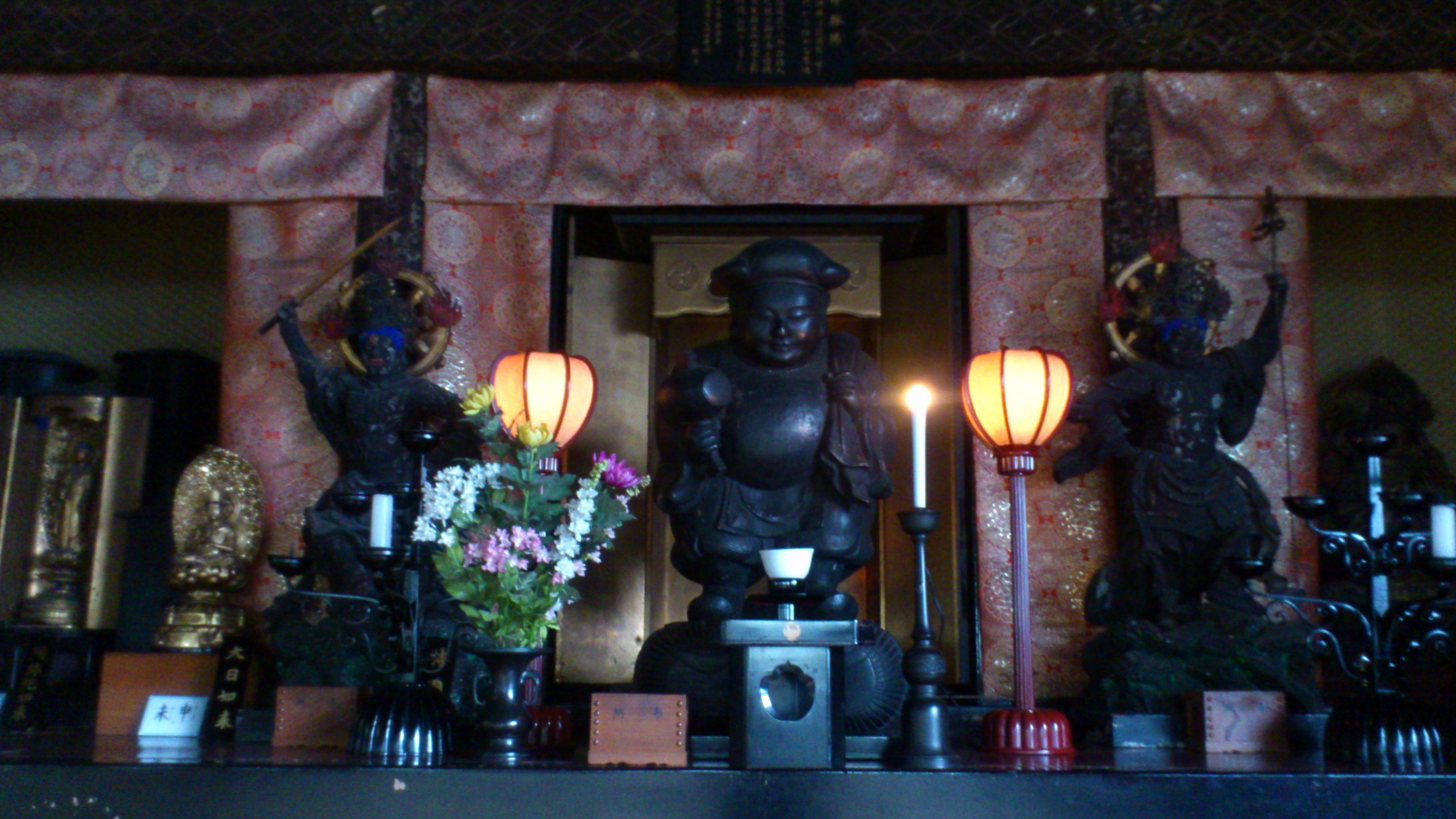
Image of Daikokuten at Gokoku-in, Taitō, Tokyo

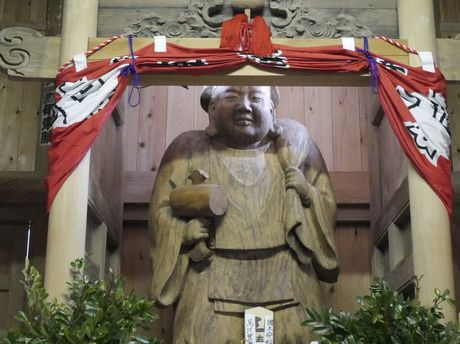
Asahi Kaiun Daikokuten at Mano-dera, Minamibōsō, Chiba Prefecture

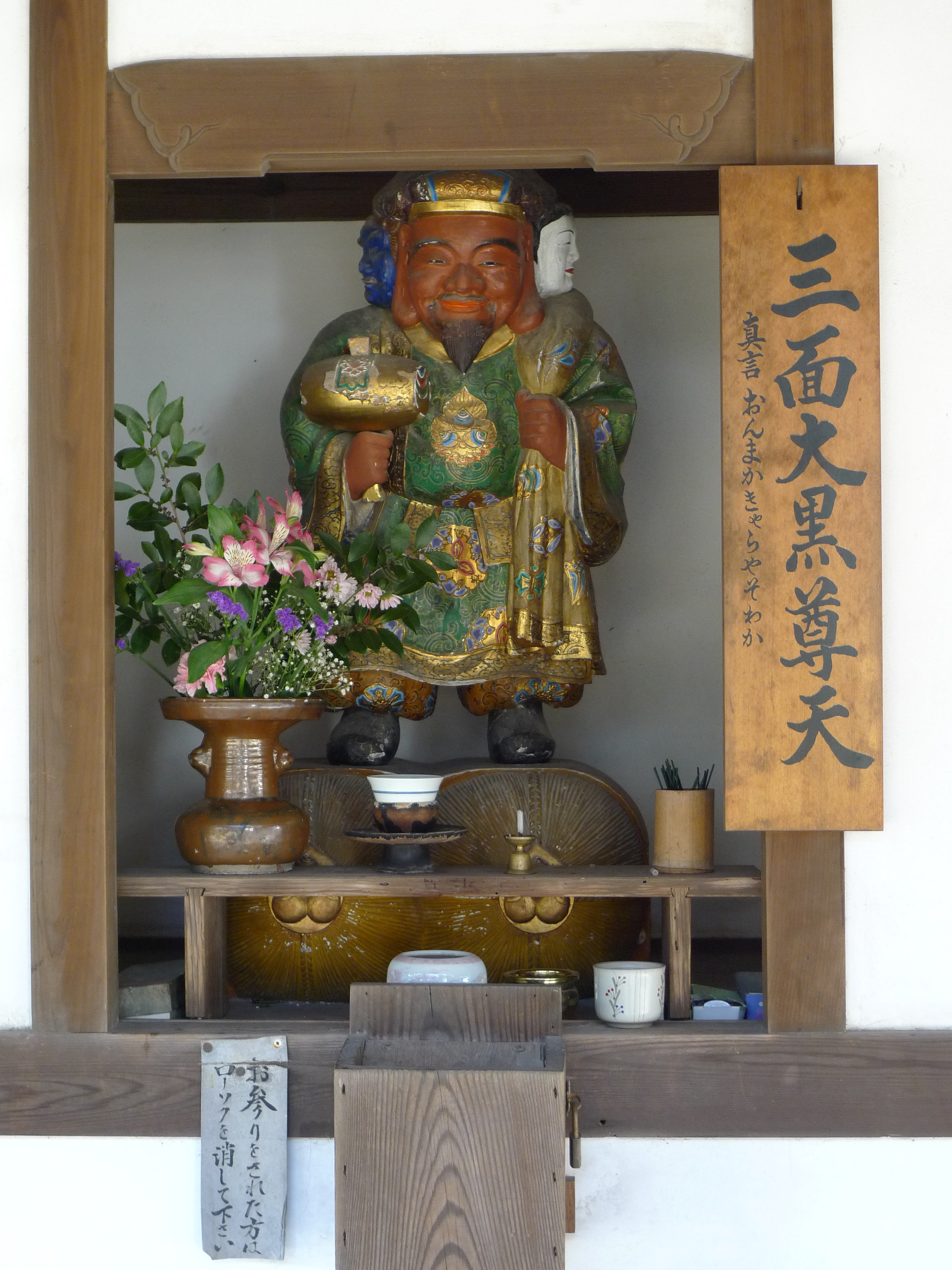
Sanmen Daikokuten at Kōshō-ji, Uji, Kyoto

The following are a few examples of Buddhist temples that either have Daikokuten as their main focus of worship (honzon) or enshrine him in an auxiliary capacity.

- Enryaku-ji (Ōtsu, Shiga Prefecture) – Tendai

The Daikoku-dō (大黒堂, "Hall of Daikoku") located in the temple complex enshrines an image of the three-faced Sanmen Daikokuten attributed to Saichō, who is said to have made it after the god appeared to him and promised to become the patron of his monastic community.

- Daikoku-ji (大黒寺) (Habikino City, Osaka Prefecture) – Sōtō Zen

One of the contenders for the birthplace of the cult of Mahākāla-Daikokuten in Japan. The temple's founding story claims that it was first established in 665 CE by the ascetic En no Gyōja after seeing a vision of Daikokuten riding a five-colored cloud.

- Daikoku-ji (Fushimi-ku, Kyoto) – Shingon (Tōji-ha)

Said to have been established by Kūkai, the founder of Shingon Buddhism, to whom is also attributed the image of Daikokuten that serve as the temple's honzon. Originally named Chōfuku-ji (長福寺), the temple was renamed in 1615 after Shimazu Yoshihiro designated it as a "prayer center" (祈願所, kigansho) for his clan, the Shimazu, and their fiefdom, Satsuma Domain, where religious services are performed on their behalf.

- Myōen-ji (妙円寺) (Matsugasaki Higashimachi, Sakyō-ku, Kyoto) – Nichiren-shū

Founded in 1616; also known as Matsugasaki Daikokuten (松ヶ崎大黒天). Enshrines a statue of Daikokuten attributed to Saichō.

- Mano-dera / Mano-ji (真野寺) (Kubo, Minamibōsō, Chiba Prefecture) – Shingon (Chisan-ha)

This temple, founded by Gyōki in 725 CE and dedicated to the Thousand-Armed Avalokiteśvara (Senju Kannon), enshrines an image of Daikokuten claimed to be the work of the Tendai priest Ennin, known as the 'Asahi Kaiun Daikokuten' (朝日開運大黒天) – so named because Ennin is claimed to have carved it in the year 860 after witnessing a vision of the god at daybreak, as the sun was rising.

- Eishin-ji (英信寺) (Shitaya, Taitō City, Tokyo) – Jōdo-shū

A temple to the buddha Amitabha (Amida Nyorai) established in 1631. A statue of Sanmen Daikokuten attributed to Kūkai is enshrined in the Daikoku-dō beside the temple's main hall.

- Gokoku-in (護国院) (Taitō City, Tokyo) – Tendai

Part of the Ueno Park-Kan'ei-ji temple complex. Enshrines a painting of Daikokuten attributed to Fujiwara no Nobuzane donated to the temple by Tokugawa Iemitsu.

- Kyōō-ji (経王寺) (Haramachi, Shinjuku City, Tokyo) – Nichiren-shū

Founded in 1598 by the monk Nichijō, who installed there an image of Daikokuten from Kuon-ji said to have been carved by Nichiren's disciple Nippō.

- Daihō-ji (大法寺) (Moto-Azabu, Minato City, Tokyo) – Nichiren-shū

Founded in 1597. The image of Daikokuten kept in this temple, known as 'Sanshin Gusoku Daikoku-sonten' (三神具足大黒尊天), features the deity with the attributes of Benzaiten (hairstyle) and Bishamonten (armor).

- Hōju-ji (宝珠寺) – (Onogawamachi, Yonezawa City, Yamagata Prefecture) – Shingon (Daigo-ha)

Popularly known as Kinoe-ne Daikokuten Honzan (甲子大黒天本山). The image of Daikokuten in this temple is attributed to Kūkai and was originally from Dainichi-ji (大日寺, in modern Nishikawa, Nishimurayama District), one of the four bettō-ji (administrative temples) of Mount Yudono, one of the Three Sacred Mountains of Dewa Province (Dewa Sanzan). The statue was transferred to its current location after Dainichi-ji was converted into a Shinto shrine during the Meiji period.

Daikokuten temples
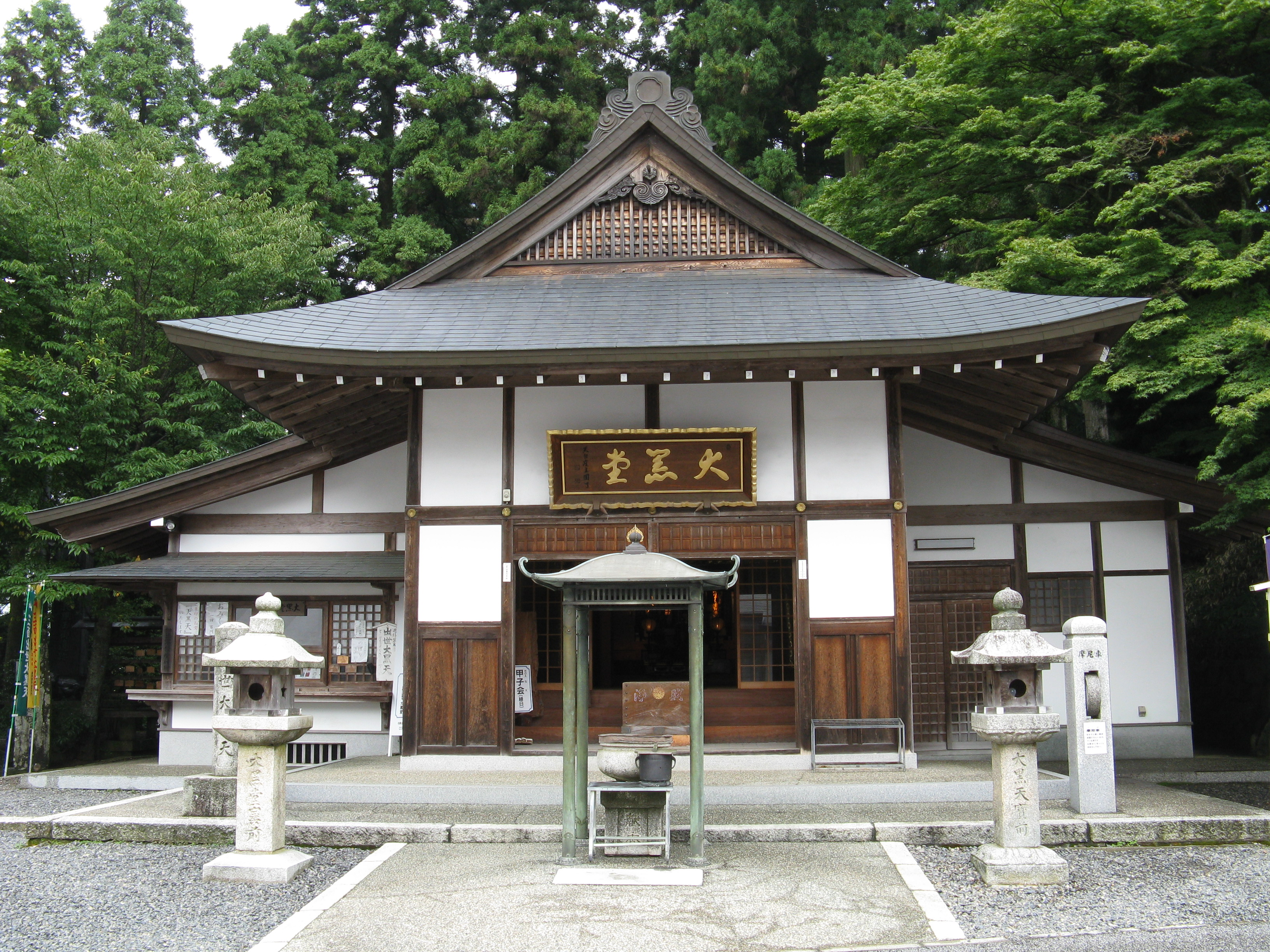
Daikoku-dō (大黒堂) at the Enryaku-ji temple complex in Mount Hiei, the headquarters of the Tendai school

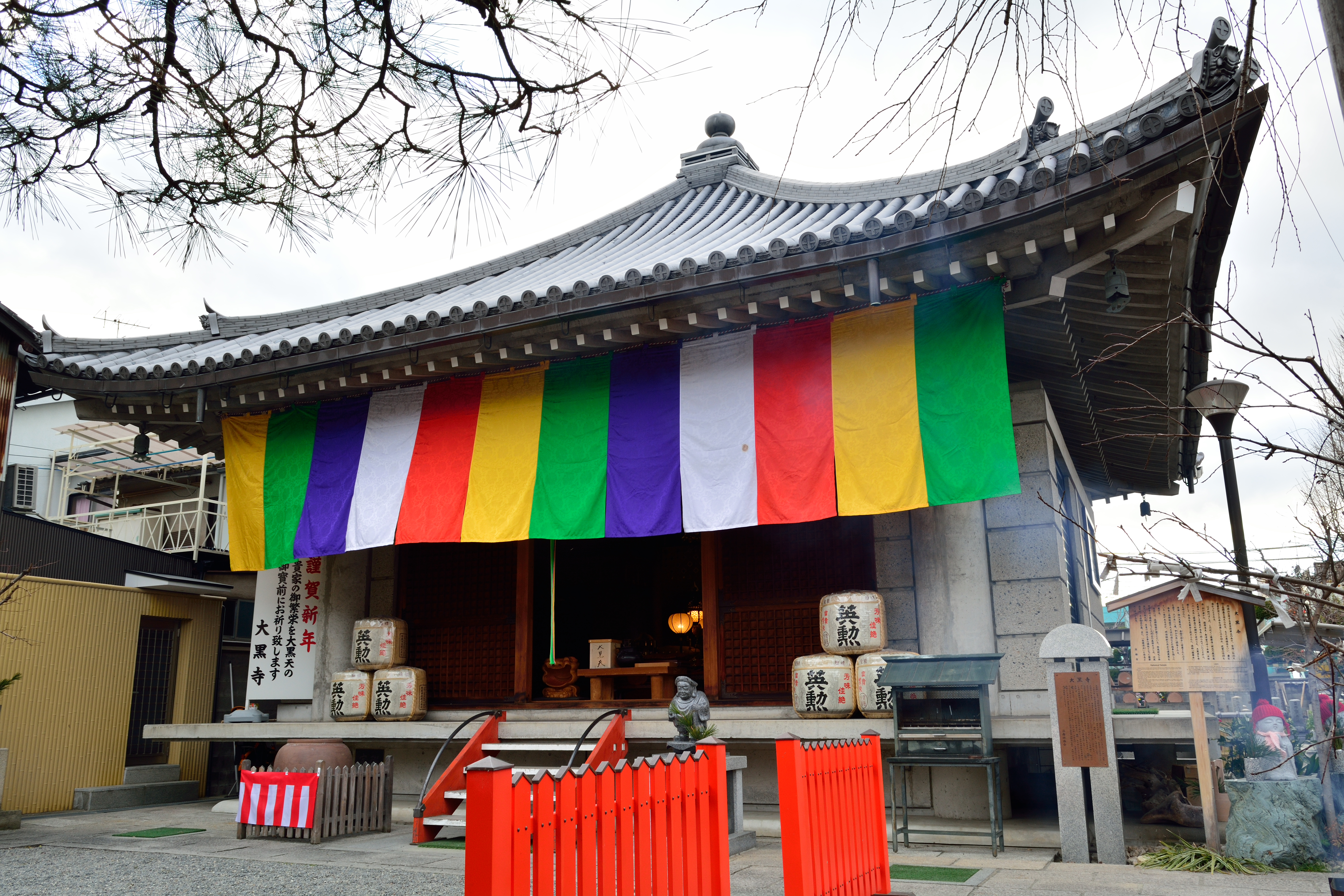
Daikoku-ji (Fushimi-ku, Kyoto)

Kozuchi Shrine (小槌宮, Kozuchi-no-miya) at Hōshaku-ji (Ōyamazaki, Kyoto)

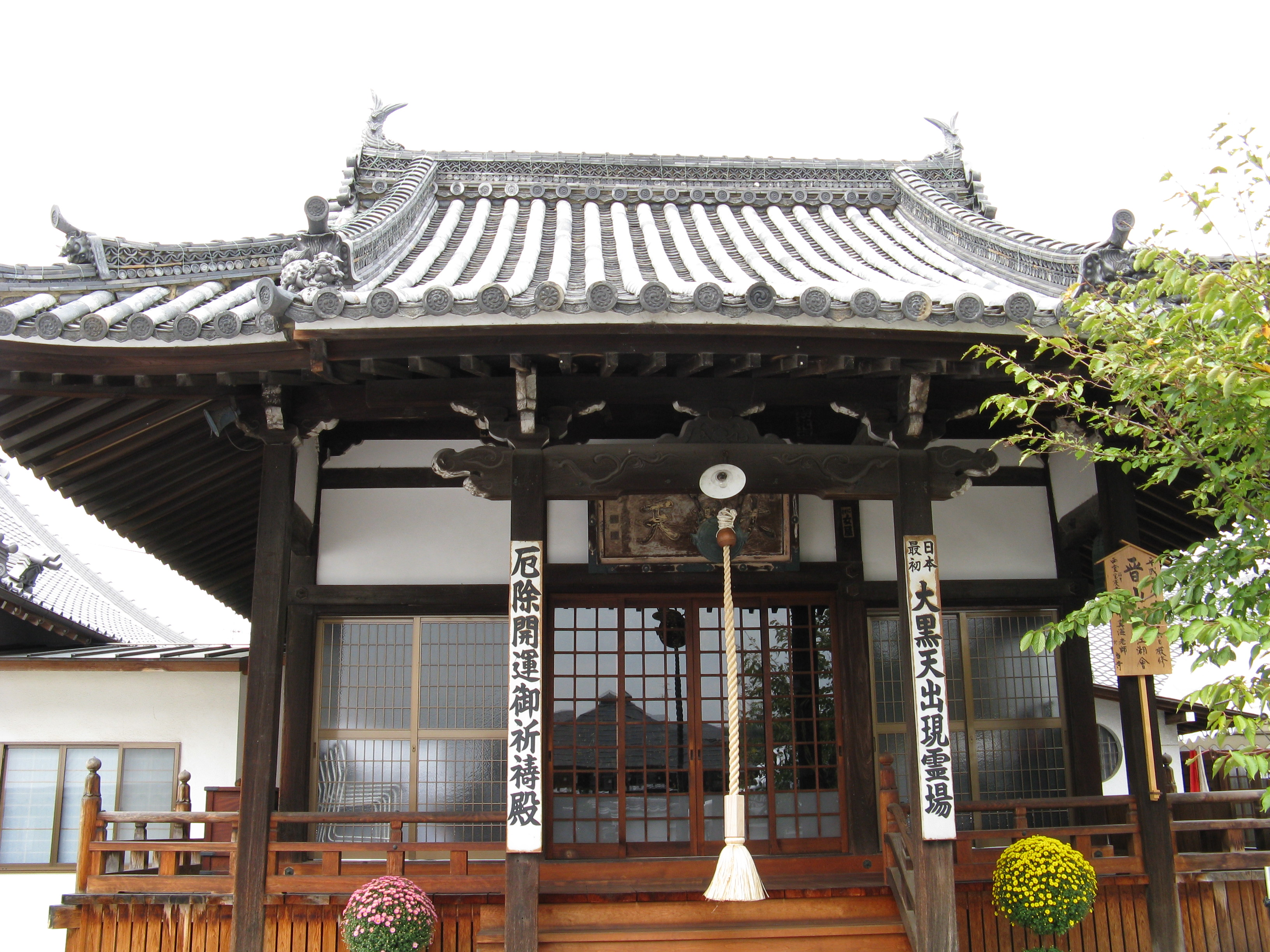
Daikoku-ji (Habikino, Osaka)

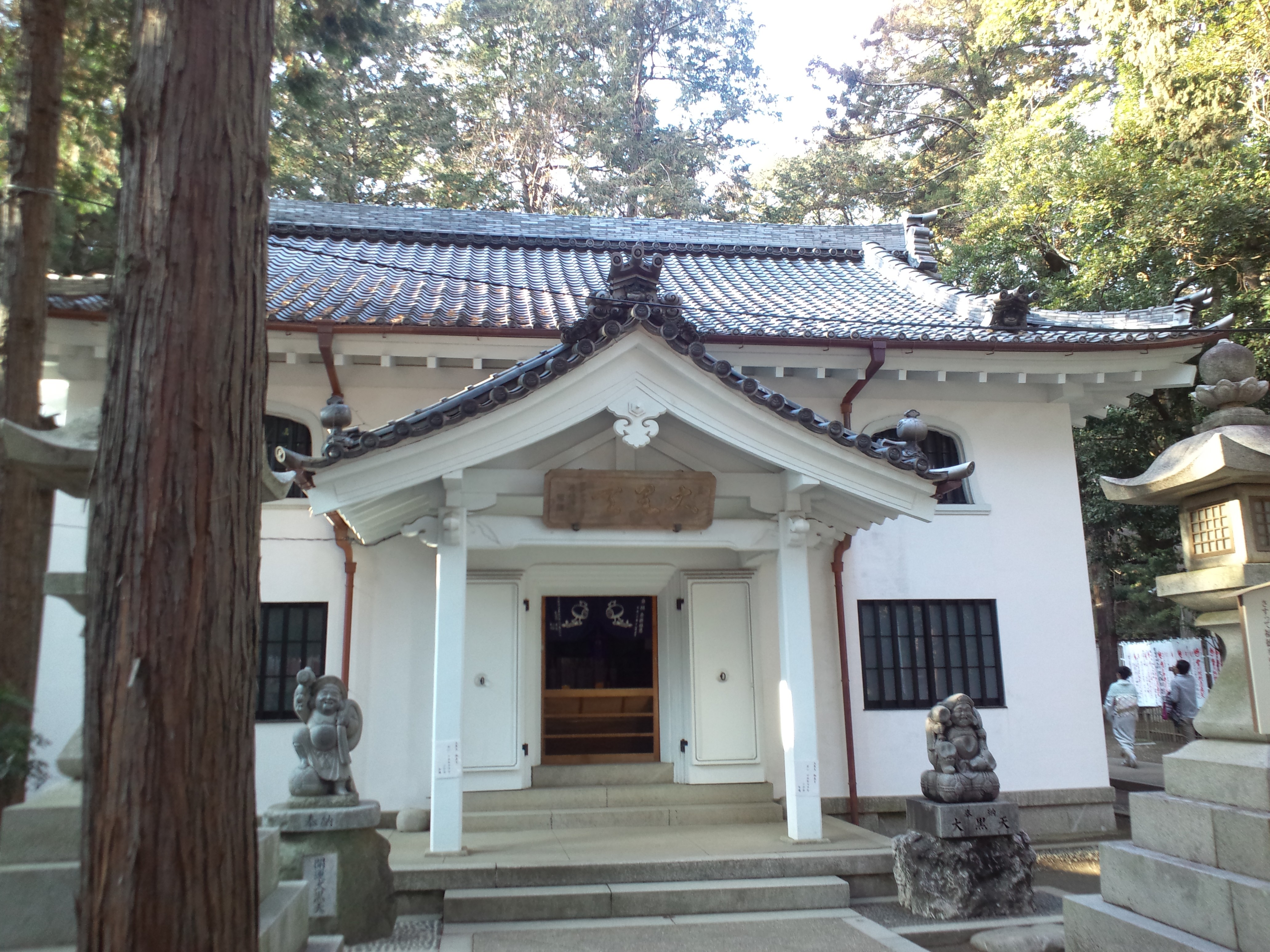
Daikoku-dō at Myōgon-ji (Toyokawa Inari) in Toyokawa, Aichi Prefecture, famous for its guardian deity Toyokawa Dakiniten

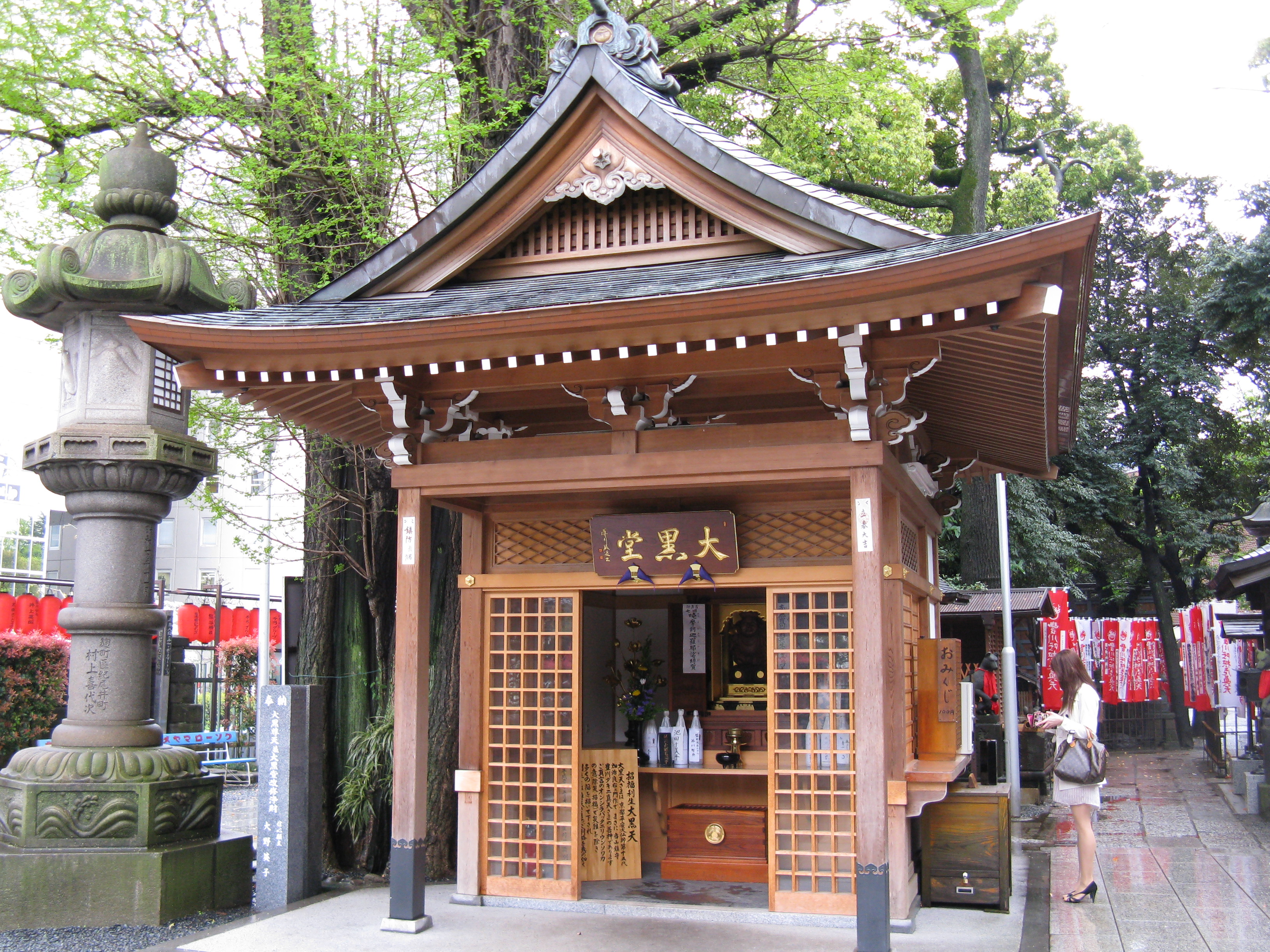
Daikoku-dō at Toyokawa Inari's Tokyo branch temple in Akasaka

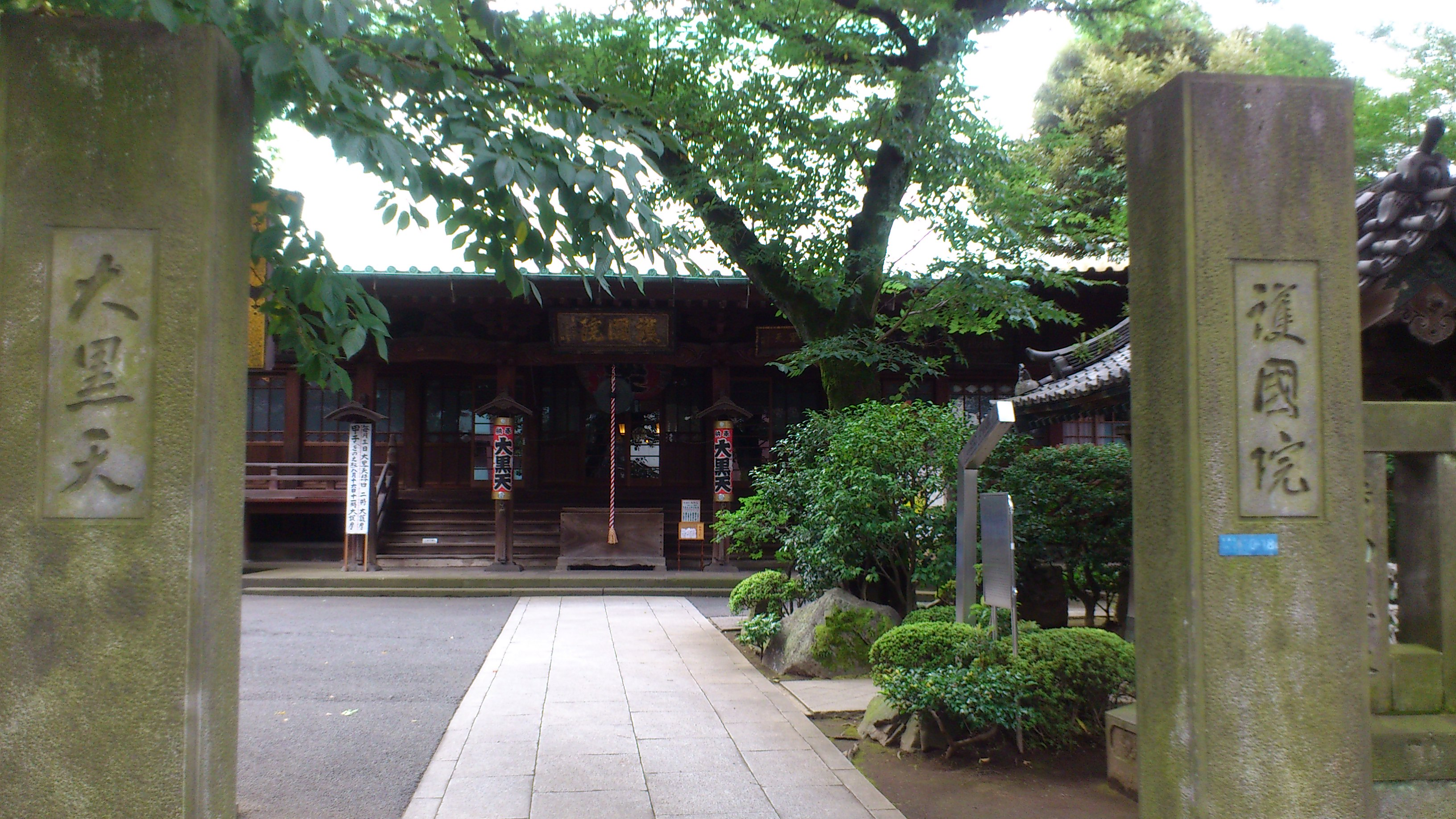
Gokoku-in (Ueno Park)

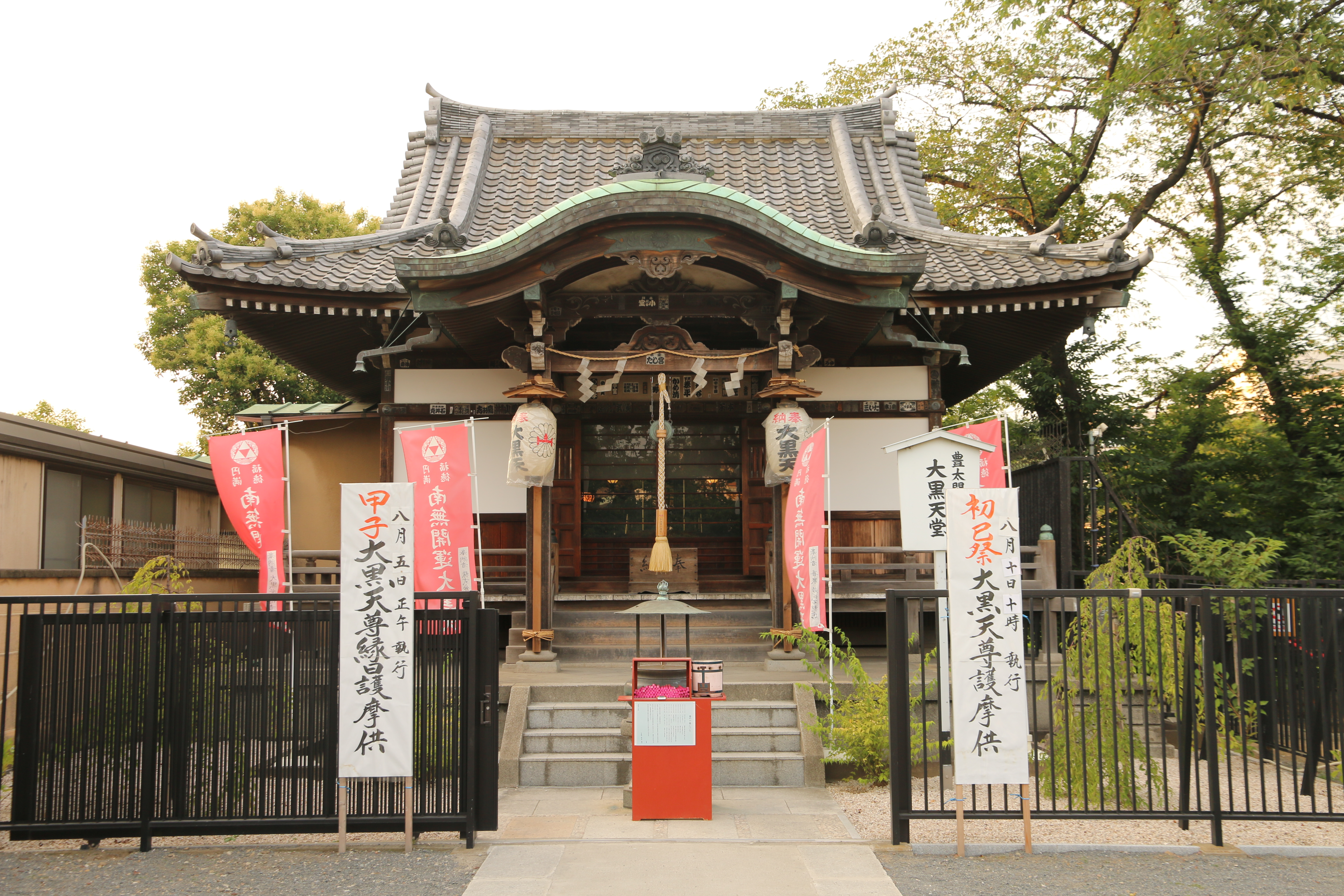
Daikokuten-dō (大黒天堂) at Shinobazu Pond, Ueno Park

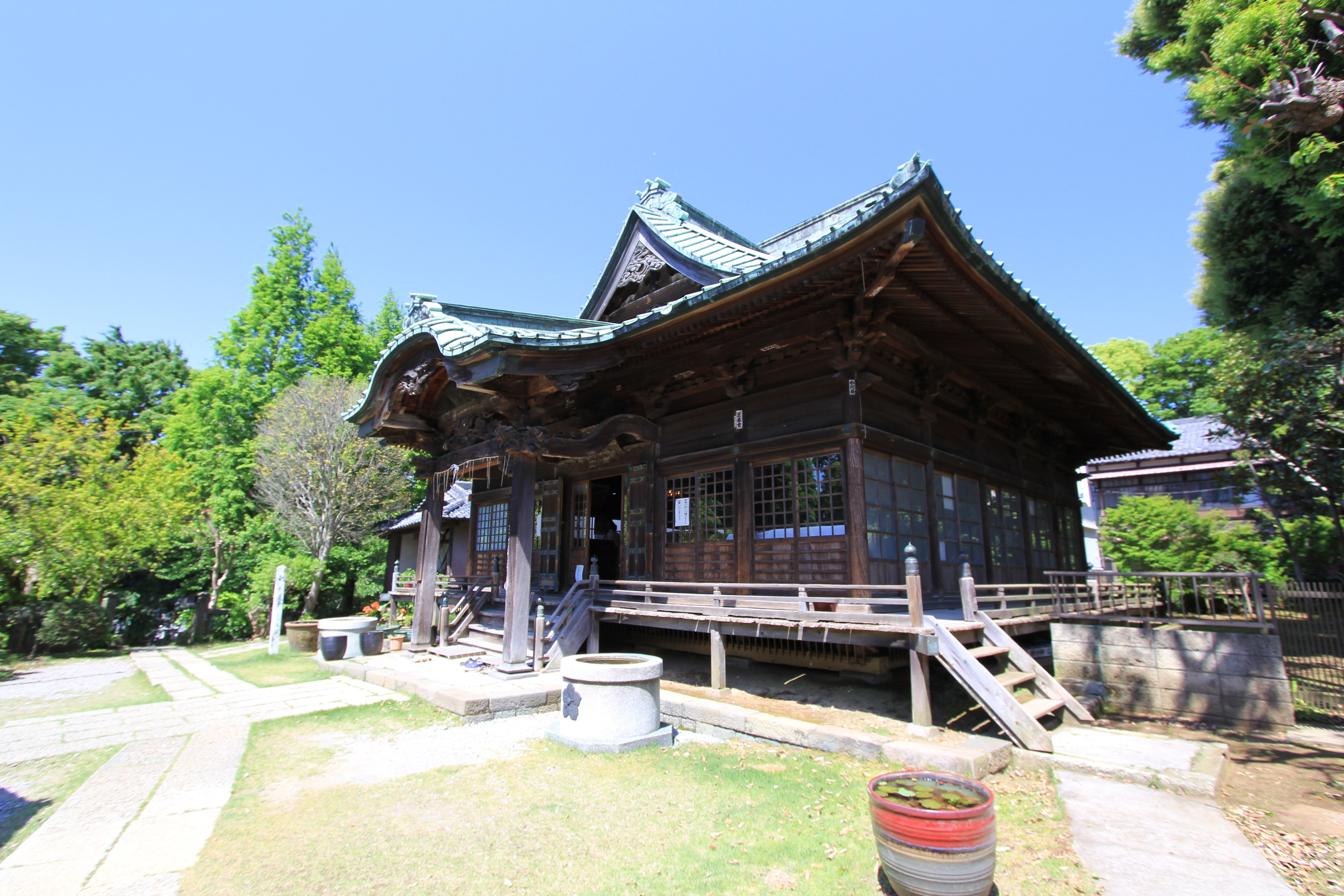
Setsu-dō (刹堂) at Nakayama Hokekyō-ji (Ichikawa, Chiba), enshrining Hārītī (Kishimojin), the Ten Rakṣasīs, and Daikokuten

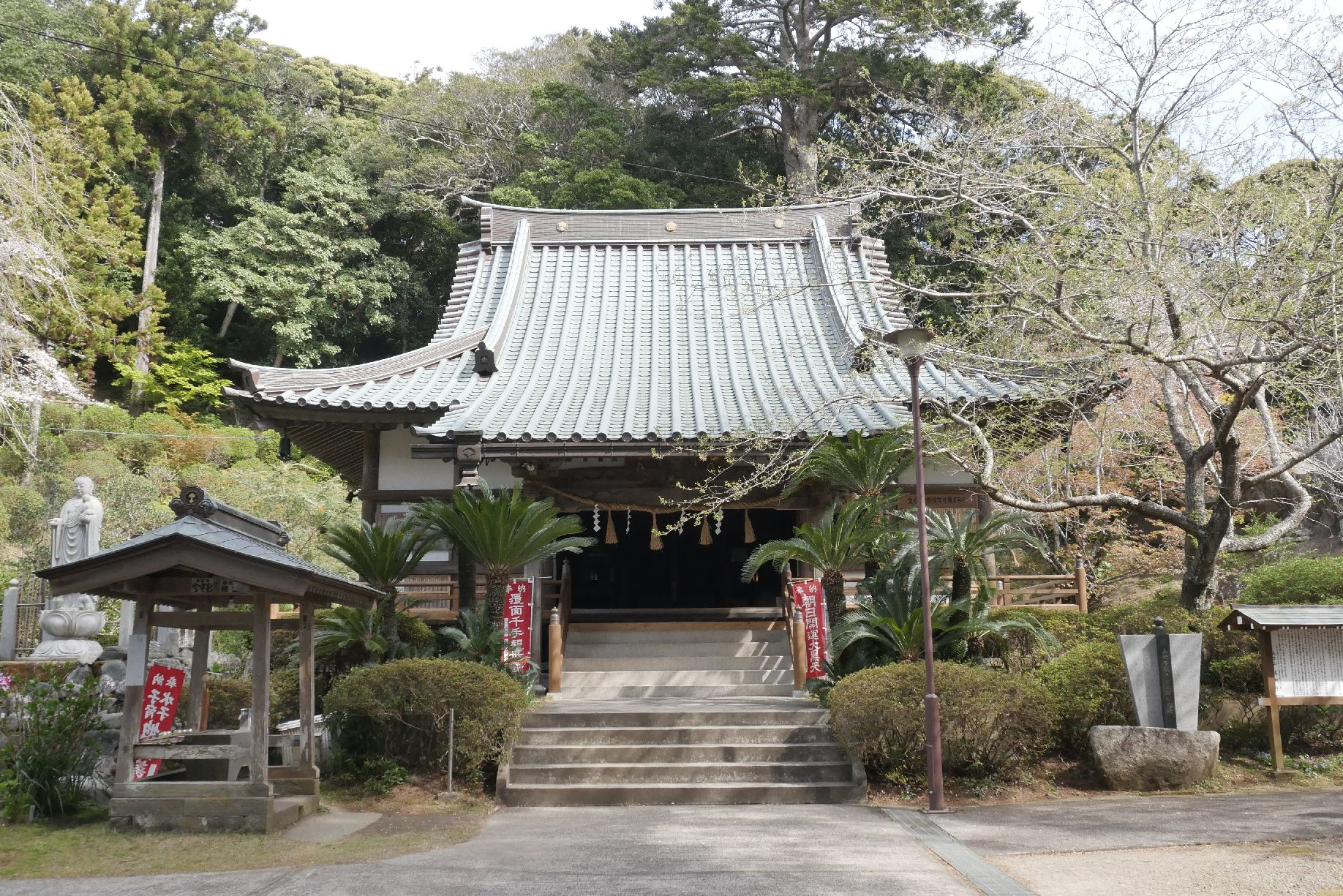
Mano-dera (Minamibōsō, Chiba)
Daikokuten images in Shinto shrines
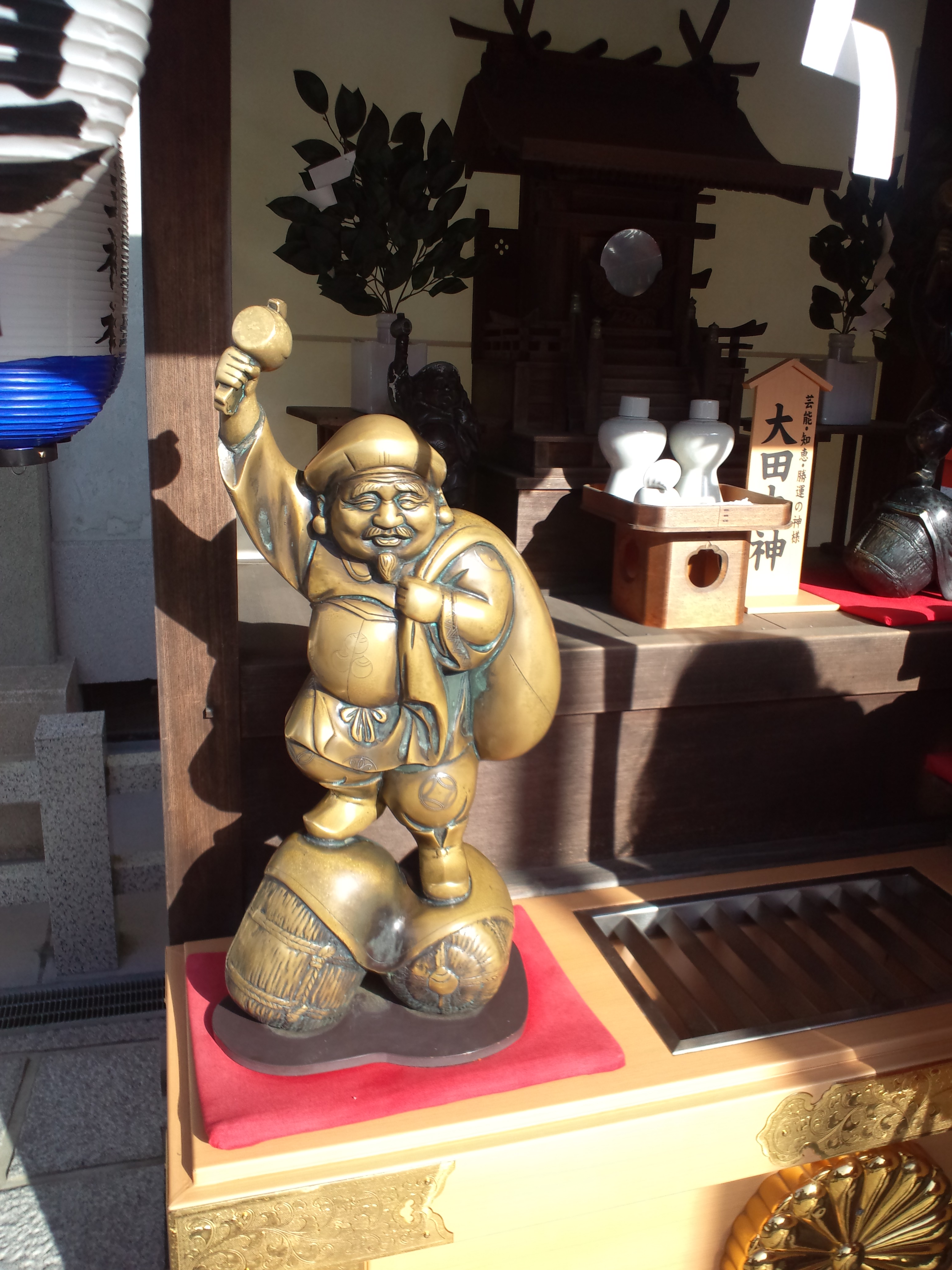
Nade Daikoku (撫で大国), a touchable image of Daikokuten (identified here with Ōkuninushi) at Jishu Shrine (Higashiyama-ku, Kyoto)

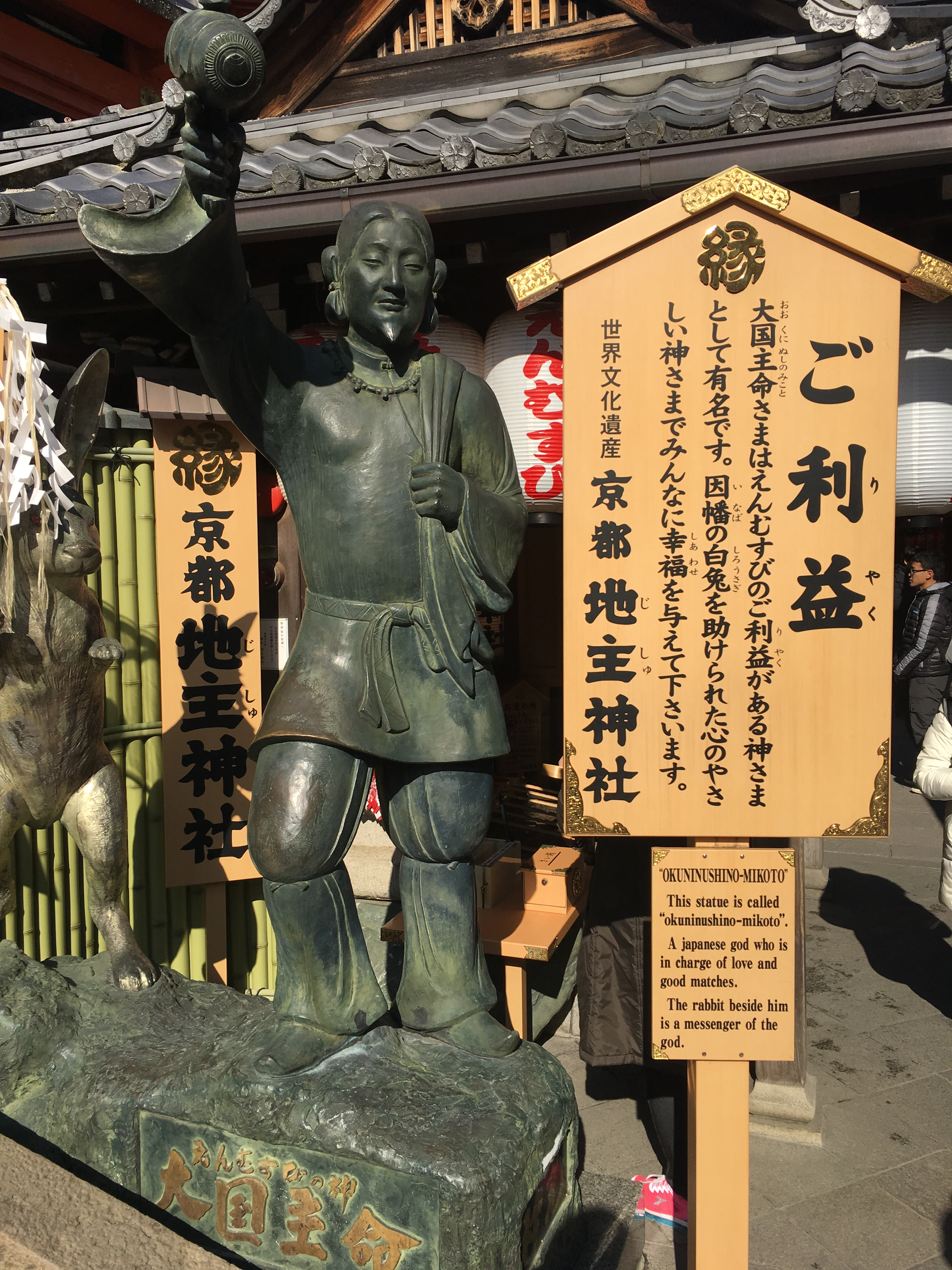
Ōkuninushi bearing Daikokuten's mallet, Jishu Shrine

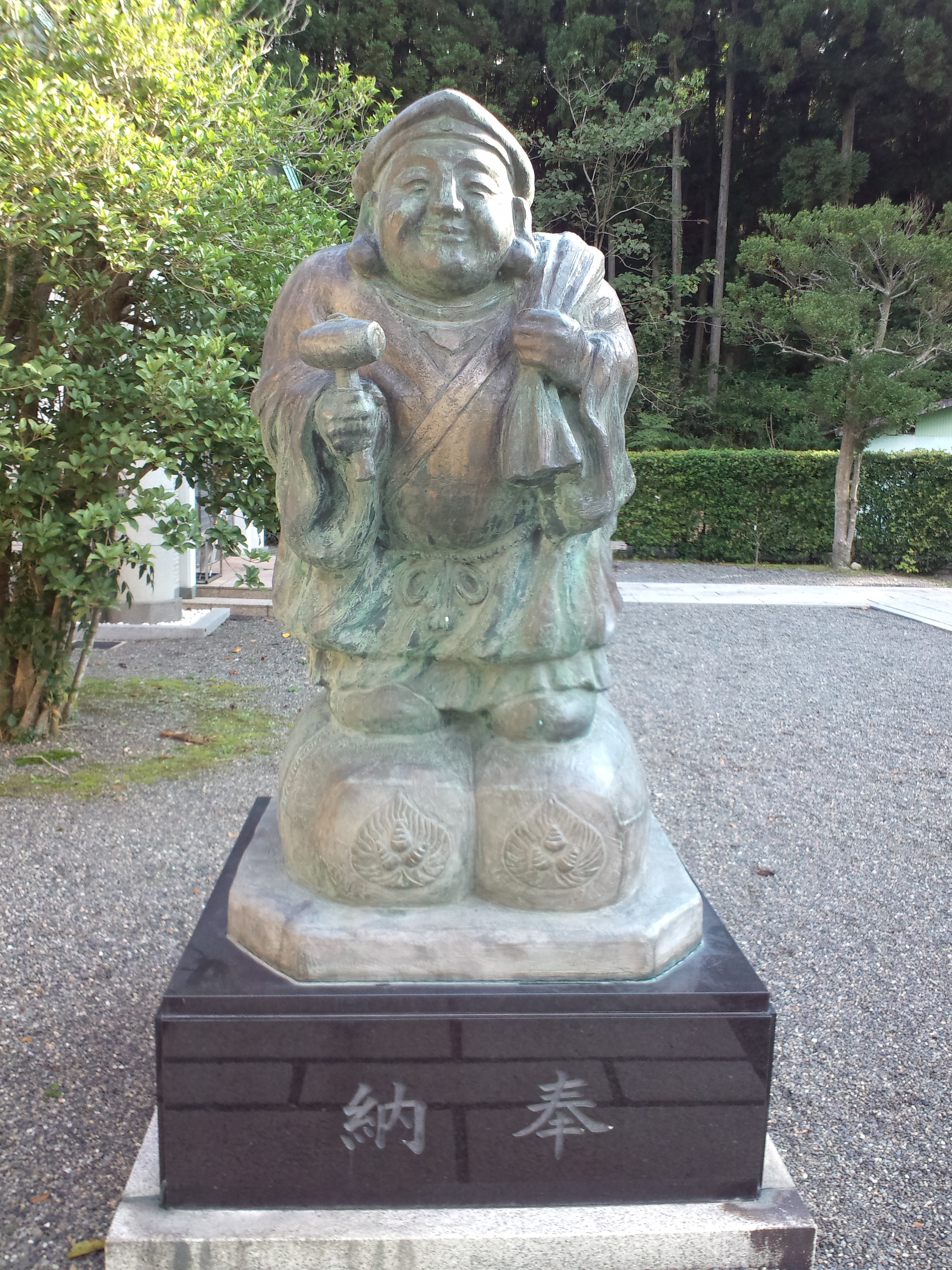
Statue of Daikokuten-Ōkuninushi at Izumo Taisha Kyoto Bun'in (branch of Izumo Taisha in Kameoka, Kyoto)

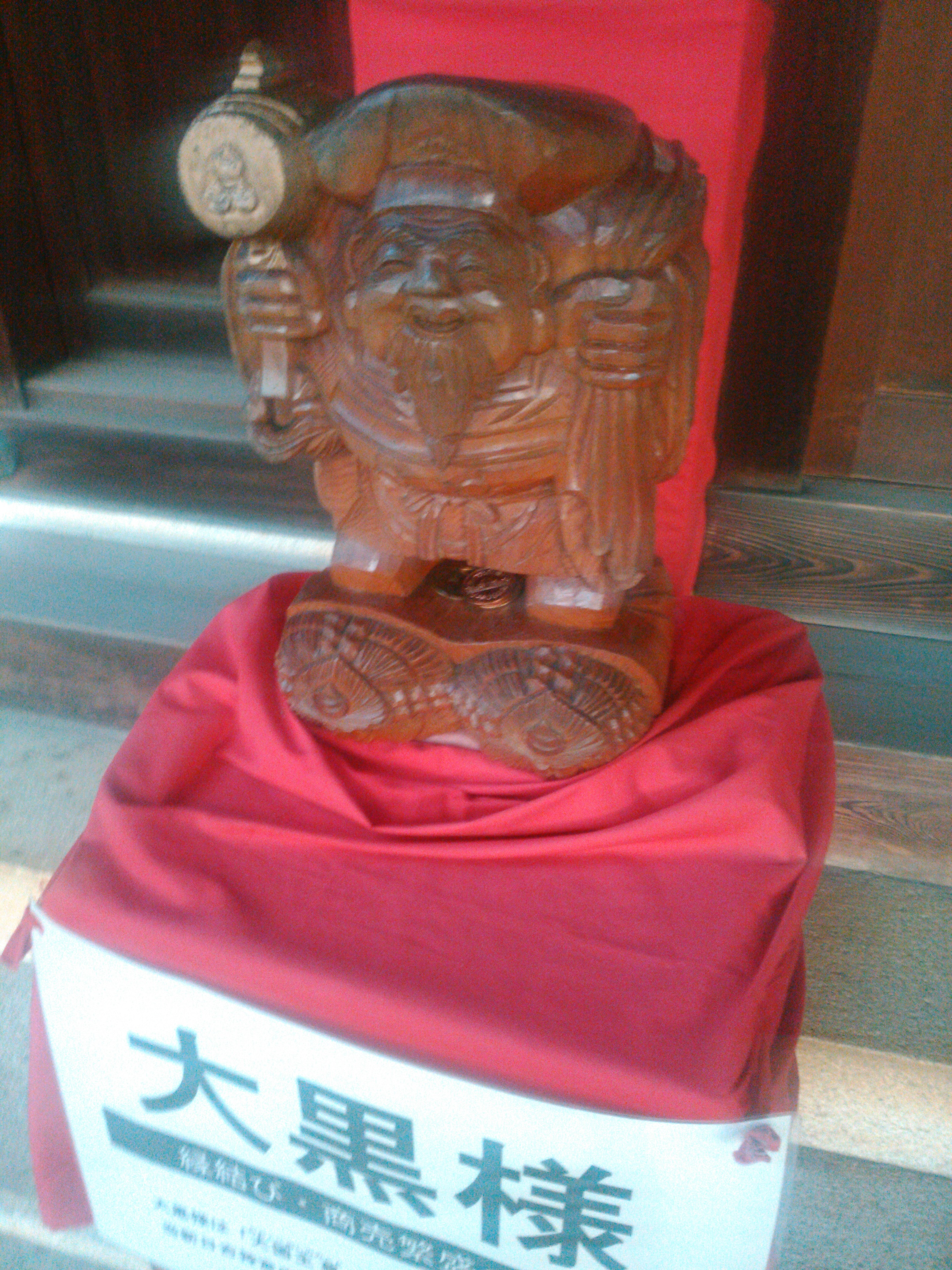
Statue of 'Daikoku-sama' (大黒様) at Imahie Jingū (Higashiyama-ku, Kyoto)

== In popular culture ==
One theory claims that the term daikoku-bashira (大黒柱), referring to the central supporting pillar of a traditional Japanese house, originated from Daikokuten's name. This word has also come to figuratively refer to the chief breadwinner of a family. The wife of a Buddhist priest was also referred to in popular slang as Daikoku, due to Daikokuten's association with the kitchen and the household in general.

A traditional art widely performed during the medieval and early modern periods known as Daikoku-mai (大黒舞, lit. "dance of Daikoku") involved performers – usually social outcasts (hinin) – costumed as Daikokuten going from door to door to dance and sing in exchange for donations.

Figurines or plaques of his image can be found in shops throughout Japan.

== See also ==
- Bhairava
- Dakini
- Ebisu
- Gajasurasamhara
- Hinduism in Japan
- Kubera
- Mahakala
- Mahākāli
- Pañcika
- Seven Lucky Gods
  - Uchide no kozuchi
- Shinbutsu-shūgō
- Tenbu (天部)

== Bibliography ==
- Faure, Bernard (2015). The Fluid Pantheon: Gods of Medieval Japan, Volume 1. University of Hawaii Press. ISBN 978-0824857028.
- Faure, Bernard (2015). Protectors and Predators: Gods of Medieval Japan, Volume 2. University of Hawaii Press. ISBN 978-0824857721.
- Iyanaga, Nobumi (2008). "Under the Shadow of the Great Śiva: Tantric Buddhism and its Influence on Japanese Mediaeval Culture". academia.edu.
- Chaudhuri, Saroj Kumar (2003). Hindu Gods and Goddesses in Japan. Vedams eBooks (P) Ltd. ISBN 978-8179360095.
- Turnbull, Stephen (2015). Japan's Sexual Gods: Shrines, Roles and Rituals of Procreation and Protection. Brill. ISBN 978-9004293786.
- Qie, Dan (2020). "日本における大黒天の変容について" [On the Transformation of Mahakara in Japan] (PDF). 東アジア文化交渉研究 [Journal of East Asian Cultural Interaction Studies] (in Japanese). 13: 753–764.
- Uryū, Naka (2016). よくわかる真言宗 (Yoku wakaru Shingon-shū) (in Japanese). Kadokawa. ISBN 978-4044001353.
