= Reticule =

Reticule may refer to:

- Reticle, or reticule, fine lines in the eyepiece of a sighting device
- Reticule (handbag), a type of small handbag
