= Kangiten =

Japanese Buddhist elephant-headed god

Kangiten (Nandikeshvara)
- God of obstacles, bliss and success
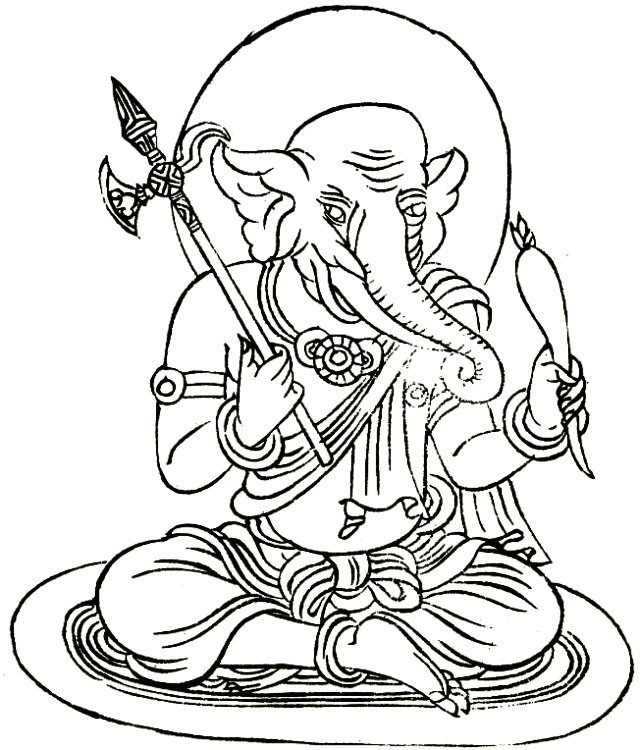
- Single-bodied (単身, tanshin) Kangiten holding an axe and a daikon, 1869
- Other names: Shōten / Shōden (聖天) Shōten- / Shōden-sama (聖天様 / 聖天さま); Daishō Kangiten (大聖歓喜天); Kangi Jizaiten (歓喜自在天); Daishō Kangi Daijizaiten (大聖歓喜大自在天); Daishō Kangi Sōshin Tennō (大聖歓喜双身天王); Nandai Jizaiten (難提自在天); Zōbiten (象鼻天); Binayaka / Binayakya (毘那夜迦); Ganapati / Ganahachi / Ganahattei (誐那缽底) Tenson (天尊)
- Japanese: 歓喜天 (shinjitai) 歡喜天 (kyūjitai)
- Affiliation: Deva; Vairochana Buddha; Eleven-Headed Avalokiteshvara; Amritakundalin; Sanbō Kōjin
- Abode: Mount Kailash (Keira-sen)
- Mantra: Oṃ hrīḥ gaḥ huṃ svāhā (On kiri(ku) gyaku un sowaka)
- Weapon: axe, trident
- Symbols: kangidan (modak), daikon, kinchaku
- Gender: Male

Genealogy
- Parents: Maheshwar (father); Uma (mother)
- Siblings: Senayaka (brother, later reincarnated as wife; incarnation of Avalokiteshvara); Skanda (brother); Kigeiten (sister)
- Consort: Senayaka

Equivalents
- Hindu: Ganesha

Kangiten or Kankiten (Japanese: 歓喜天, "god of bliss"; Sanskrit (IAST): Nandikeśvara), also known as Binayaka (毘那夜迦; Skt. Vināyaka), Ganabachi (誐那鉢底, alternatively Ganahachi or Ganahattei; Skt. Ganapati), or more commonly, Shōten or Shōden (聖天, lit. "sacred god" or "noble god"), is a deva (ten) venerated mainly in the Shingon and Tendai schools of Japanese Buddhism who is the Buddhist equivalent of the Hindu deity Ganesha.

Although Kangiten (Shōten) and Ganesha share a common origin and a number of traits, there are also some marked differences between the two. For instance, the Buddhist Vinayaka was (at least at first) negatively portrayed as the creator of obstacles and the leader of a class of malignant demons who obstructed Buddhist practice called vinayakas, though later tradition made an attempt to distinguish between the vinayakas and their lord, who became seen as a manifestation of the bodhisattva Avalokiteshvara (Kannon in Japanese) and/or the buddha Vairochana.

Kangiten enjoys both a positive and negative reception in Japan. On the one hand, he is popularly revered as an extremely efficacious god who grants whatever is asked of him without fail, including impossible wishes. He is also said to watch over those who have a karmic connection with him from the moment of their conception, serving as their invisible companion throughout their lives. On the other hand, he is considered to be still bound by base passions and desires (kleshas) and thus is sometimes also regarded as a rather volatile, demanding god who is quick to punish those who have offended him.

Unlike his Hindu counterpart, whose image is prominently displayed in public, Kangiten is considered too sacred to be seen: images of the deity in temples are kept hidden from view, rituals centered on him are performed by qualified monks out of public sight, and lay devotees are discouraged from venerating iconographic depictions of the god at home.

While he is sometimes depicted as an elephant-headed single male deity like Ganesha, he is more commonly portrayed as a male-female couple (both with elephant heads) standing in an embrace in an iconographic depiction known as the Dual(-bodied) Kangiten (双身歓喜天, Sōshin Kangiten) or the Embracing Kangiten.

== Names ==
Kangiten inherited many names and characteristics from the Hindu god Ganesha (with whom he shares a common origin), though the name 'Ganesha' (IAST: Ganeśa) itself was never applied to the Buddhist deity, who was generally referred to by the earlier names 'Ganapati' (Gaṇapati) or 'Vinayaka' (Vināyaka). 'Vinayaka' was transcribed into Chinese characters as 毘那夜迦 (pinyin: Pínàyèjiā; Japanese (rōmaji): Binayaka / Binayakya), 頻那夜迦 (pinyin: Pínnàyèjiā), and 毘那怛迦 (pinyin: Pínàdájiā), respectively, while 'Ganapati' was transcribed as 誐那鉢底 (pinyin: Énàbōdǐ; Japanese: Ganabachi / Ganahachi / Ganahattei) or 伽那鉢底 / 迦那鉢底 (Jiānàbōdǐ). The term vinayaka was also used to refer to a class of beings to which Vinayaka and/or his cohorts belong.

In Japan, the deity is commonly known as 'Shōten' / 'Shōden' (聖天, "sacred / noble god"; Skt. Āryadeva) or 'Kangiten' (歓喜天, "god of bliss"; Skt. Nandin or Nandikeśvara). The former epithet indicates his association with good luck and fortune and may be an allusion to the bodhisattva Avalokiteshvara (Kannon), who is also known as 'Aryavalokiteshvara' (Āryāvalokiteśvara; Japanese: 聖観音, Shō-Kannon), one of the figures that constitute the dual-bodied (双身, sōshin) Kangiten, while the latter is especially associated with this dual form, who is venerated as a giver of joy and prosperity. Among devotees, he is also sometimes simply referred to by the honorific 'Tenson' (天尊, "venerable deity").

In this article, the names 'Vinayaka', 'Ganapati', 'Shōten' and 'Kangiten' are used interchangeably for the Buddhist deity, with 'Kangiten' specifically denoting the deity's dual form.

== Historical development and literature ==
=== As demon and deity ===
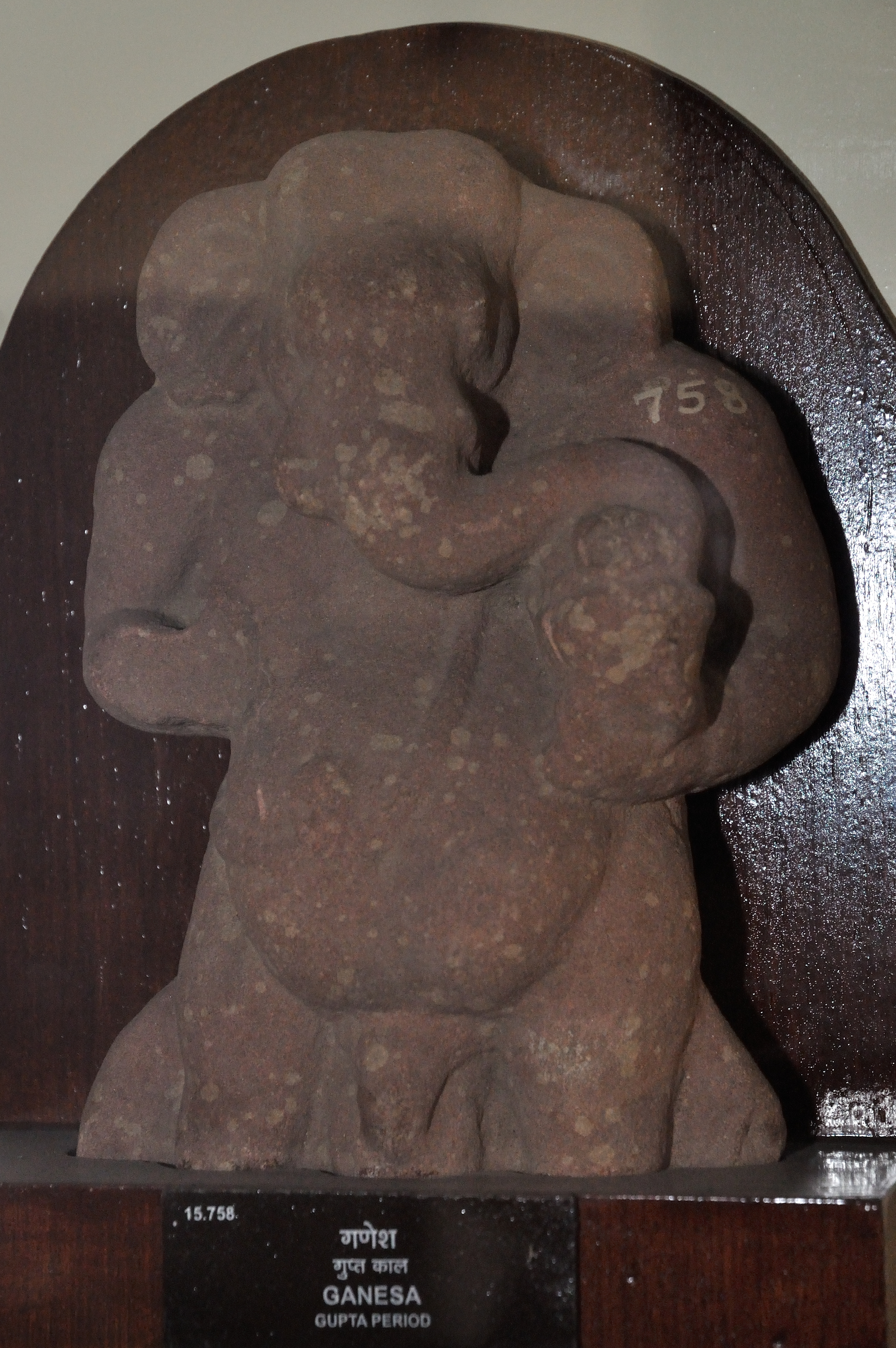
The Hindu Ganesha, Gupta Period (4th–6th century CE), Art of Mathura.

Several theories have been advanced regarding the origins of the Hindu deity Ganesha, who first undisputably appears in the historical record in his classic form around the early 4th to 5th centuries CE. One theory is that Ganesha gradually came to prominence in connection with the Vinayakas, a group of four troublesome demons mentioned in the Manava-Grihyasutra (a text belonging to the Manava school of the Black (Krishna) Yajurveda) and the Mahabharata.

Whereas in Hinduism Ganesha was regarded mainly as a remover of obstacles, Buddhists originally emphasized his destructive side as the creator of obstacles and his function as a demon king. Early instances of the name 'Vinayaka' in Buddhist texts for instance have a negative connotation, denoting a malignant being (or beings) who is both the cause and the symbolic representation of obstacles or impediments. A note in the Mahamayuri Vidyarajni Sutra (Note: 大孔雀咒王經, pinyin: Dàkǒngquè zhòuwáng jīng; Japanese: Daikujaku juō kyō.) by the Tang period monk Yijing defines Vinayaka as an "obstructive deity" (障礙神, pinyin: zhàng'àishén; Japanese: shōgeshin) and notes his widespread worship in the west (i.e. India). The Mahavairochana Tantra (also known as the Vairochanabhisambodhi Sutra) meanwhile speaks of demonic entities such as vinayakas and rakshasas being dispersed through the power of mantra. The monk Yi Xing, in his commentary on this text, (Note: 大日經疏, pinyin: Dàrì jīng shū; Japanese: Dainichi kyō shō.) describes vinayakas as obstructions produced from a deluded mind (從妄想心生). In esoteric Buddhist literature, Vinayaka is portrayed as the enemy of the ritual practitioner who is to be either expelled with mantras or soothed with ritual offerings, which are then consumed by the practitioner to increase his strength; once duly propitiated he turns into the practitioner's ally, a protecting deity who removes all impediments. Vinayaka – also known under the name 'Vighnaraja' (Vighnarāja), "Lord of Obstacles" – is sometimes also shown being trampled on by wrathful deities like Mahakala or Achala in Tibetan and East Asian Buddhist art.

The emergence of Esoteric (Tantric) Buddhism and its spread to Nepal, Tibet, and eventually to East Asia saw Vinayaka acquire a more positive role as a subjugator of demons. In Tibet, the deity was worshiped for the removal of obstacles and the granting of wealth and was at times portrayed as a wrathful, multiarmed deity wielding weapons. A Nepalese text provides a list of spells invoking Ganapati to not only bestow wealth but also to cause harm to enemies. Vinayaka is also depicted in a wall painting in Mogao Cave 285 in Dunhuang as a protector of Buddhism with the gods Maheshvara (Shiva) and Skanda.

=== Introduction to Japan ===
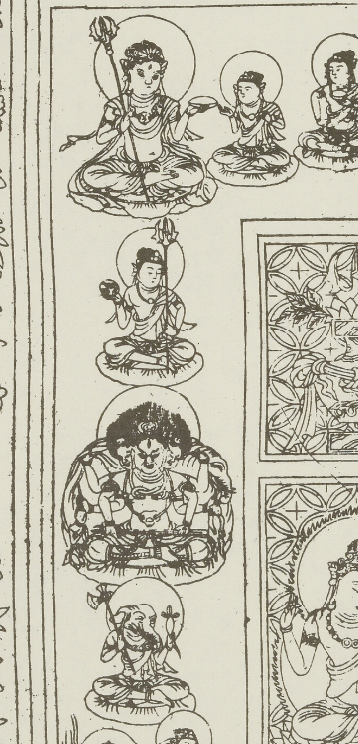
The deities Ishana (Ishanaten), his consort Ishani, Mahakala (Makakara / Daikokuten) and Vinayaka (Binayaka) as depicted in the northeast (upper left) corner of the Womb Realm (Garbhakoshadhatu) Mandala

The two primary mandalas of East Asian esoteric Buddhism (Tangmi) also feature Vinayaka(s). In the Womb Realm (Garbhakoshadhatu) Mandala (based on the Mahavairochana Tantra), Vinayaka is found among the retinue of the directional deity Ishana with the god Mahakala (both of whom are derived from the Hindu Shiva), while the outer sections of the Vajra Realm (Vajradhatu) Mandala (based on the Vajrashekhara Sutra) contains four groups of five deities distributed along the four directions, each group containing one vinayaka – here interpreted as emanations of the buddha Vairochana who expressly adopt the form of vinayakas in order to subjugate the obstacle-causing demons.

Vinayaka's inclusion in these mandalas – brought to Japan by Kūkai (774–835), the founder of Shingon Buddhism – facilitated his introduction to Japan, where he (like most other Hindu deities assimilated in Buddhism) was first considered a minor guardian of the two mandalas. By the Heian period (794–1185), Vinayaka emerged as a besson (別尊, lit. "separate/distinct worthy"), a deity with an individualized cult centered around him. The deity's cult was developed within the Shingon school by the monk Kakuban (1095–1143), while in Tendai, it was systematized by Annen (841–889?).

=== Emergence of Dual Vinayaka (Kangiten) ===
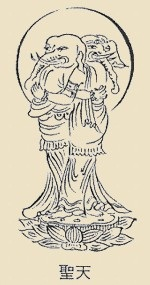
Dual-bodied Shōten (Kangiten), from the Butsuzōzui (1690)

The late Heian period saw the rise in popularity of the Dual-bodied Kangiten (Sōshin / Sōjin Kangiten) image, in which Vinayaka (heretofore depicted as a single figure, often with two arms but sometimes also four or six) is shown as an embracing male-female couple.

The origins of this imagery, unique to East Asia, have perplexed scholars for years; there is no concrete evidence about the inception of this form. It has been compared with the sexual yab-yum iconography found in Nepal and Tibet, although it is markedly different from them in that both figures have animal heads (yab-yum representations are restricted to fully humanoid deities; the zoocephalic Vinayaka-Ganapati was thus not portrayed in this form, though erotic depictions of him do exist) and are shown fully clothed. Lode Rosseels suggests that the Dual Vinayaka form may have originated from an iconographic type attested in Xinjiang (Chinese Turkestan) and Dunhuang in the 8th century showing Ganapati with four legs (representing the deity's union with his shakti in a non-sexual fashion), which was "reinterpreted by the Chinese in accordance with popular Taoist ideals ... which probably resulted in the restoration of the four-legged and four-armed form to two almost identical elephant-headed deities in a nonsexual embrace."

The form is first attested in 7th–8th century Chinese esoteric Buddhist texts. The Dharani-samuchchaya Sutra (Taishō Tripitaka 901), (Note: 陀羅尼集經, pinyin: Tuóluóní-jí jīng; Japanese: Darani-shū kyō.) translated into Chinese by a monk named Atigupta (or Atikuta) in 653–654 CE describes a ritual to worship the Dual Vinayaka, which was replicated by Amoghavajra (705–774) in his ritual text Rite of the Dual-bodied Vinayaka, the Great Saintly Deva of Bliss (T. 1266). (Note: 大聖歡喜雙身毘那夜迦法, pinyin: Dàshèngtiān huānxǐ shuāngshēn Pínàyèjiā fǎ; Japanese: Daishōten kangi sōshin Binayaka hō.) The text gives instructions for the fashioning of both the dual-bodied and the six-armed single Vinayaka images and specifies the types of offerings one should give to the deity.

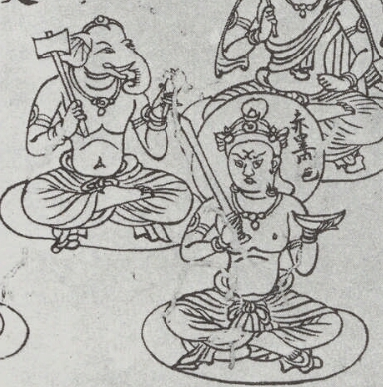
Mahakala (lower right) and Vinayaka (upper left)

Two texts attributed to Bodhiruchi (trad. 672–727), the Sutra of the Mantras and Rituals of the Gana (T. 1267), (Note: 使咒法經, pinyin: Shǐzhòufǎ jīng; Japanese: Shi juhō kyō.) and the Larger Sutra of the Mantras and Rituals of the Gana (T. 1268), (Note: 大使咒法經, pinyin: Dàshǐzhòufǎ jīng; Japanese: Daishijuhō kyō.) contain the same guidelines for rituals and depictions of the Dual-bodied Vinayaka. In the former text, Vinayaka teaches a multitude of deities and demons who have congregated at Mount Kailash a one-syllable mantra, followed by a description of a ritual dedicated to the Dual Vinayaka similar to that found in Amoghavajra's text. Vinayaka's demon followers promise the deity to grant the wishes of whoever repeats the one-syllable mantra. The Larger Gana Sutra meanwhile contains additional rituals to propitiate the Dual Vinayaka as well as the four-armed form of the deity. It also has rituals aimed at attracting love, gaining wisdom, or destroying enemies.

A ritual manual by Shubhakarasimha (637–736) titled Ritual of the Mantras and Offerings that Converted the Great Saintly Deva of Bliss King Vinayaka, the Dual-Bodied Maheshvara (T. 1270) (Note: 大聖歡喜雙身大自在天毘那夜迦王歸依念誦供養法, pinyin: Dàshèng Huānxǐ shuāngshēn Dàzìzàitiān Pínàyèjiā-wáng guīyī niànsòng gòngyǎng fǎ; Japanese: Daishō Kangi sōshin Daijizaiten Binayaka-ō kie nenju kuyō hō.) mentions new myths regarding the Dual-bodied Vinayaka not found in Indian sources and is the first text that explicitly associates the deity with the bodhisattva Avalokiteshvara (Guanyin / Kannon). It also prohibits placing his images in Buddhist altar rooms.

=== Other esoteric texts on Vinayaka ===
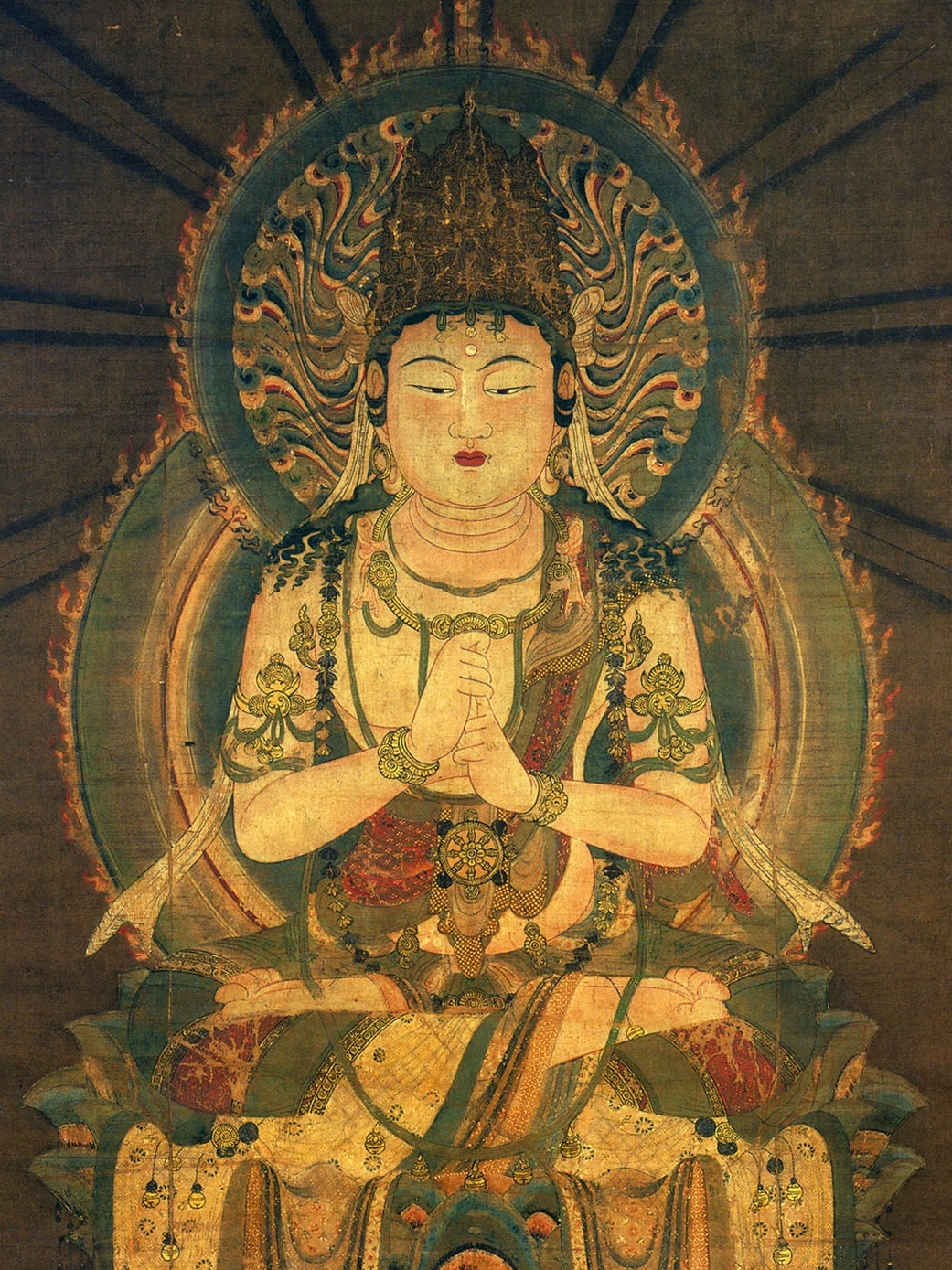
Vairochana Buddha
(Dainichi Nyorai)

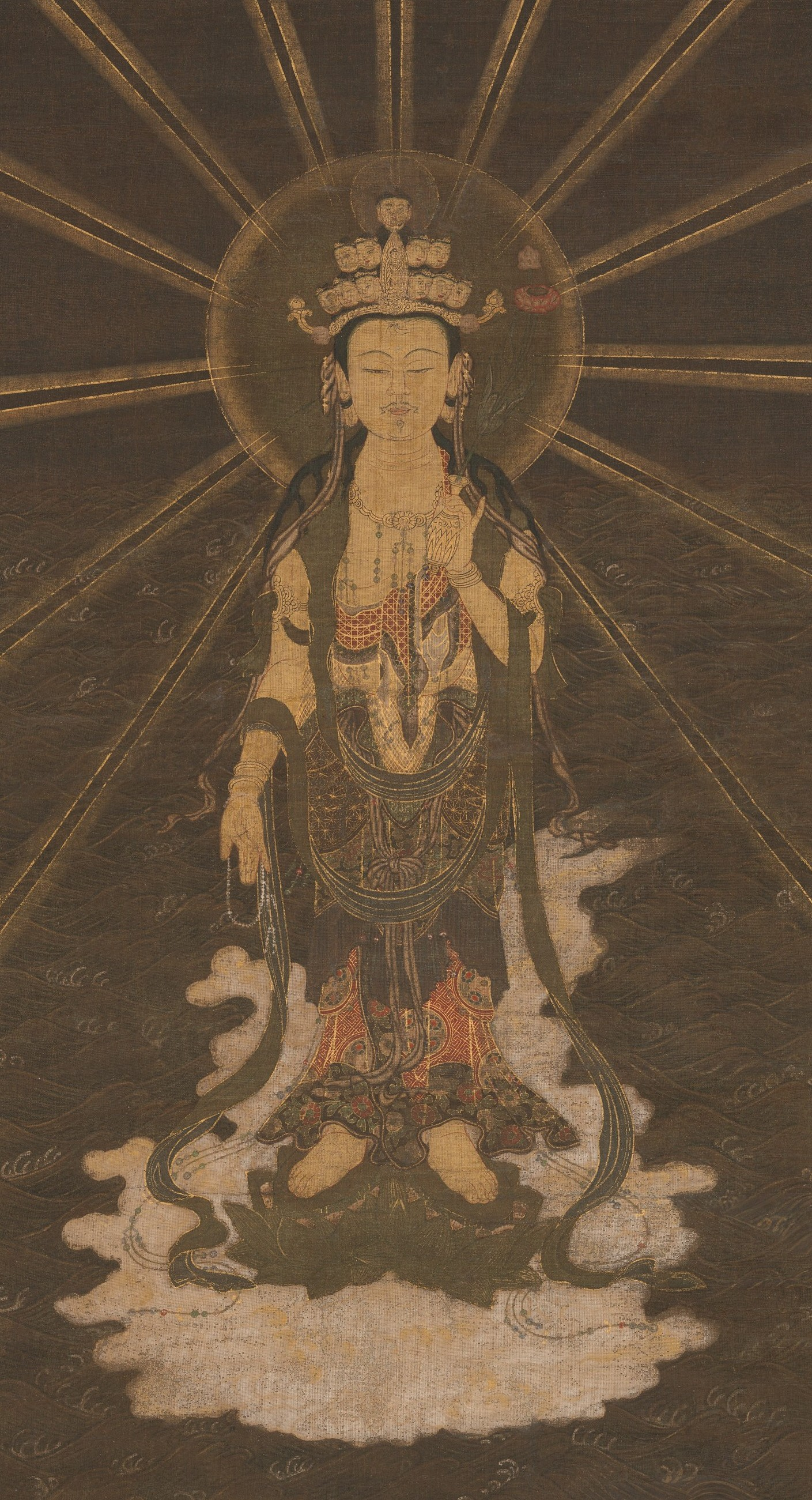
Eleven-Headed Avalokiteshvara
(Jūichimen Kannon)

Kangiten is identified as the manifestation of both the primordial buddha Vairochana and the Eleven-Headed (Ekadashamukha) form of the bodhisattva Avalokiteshvara

The Sutra of the Divine Incantations of the Eleven-Headed [Avalokiteshvara] (T. 1071), (Note: 十一面神咒心經, pinyin: Shíyīmiàn shénzhòu xīnjīng; Japanese: Jūichimen shinju shingyō.) translated by the monk Xuanzang in 656 CE, expounds the rite of bathing an image of Vinayaka with perfumed water.

A short text attributed to Amoghavajra titled Tantra on the Practice of the Secret Ritual of the Dual-bodied Bodhisattva Great Saintly Deva of Bliss, the Samaya-Body Copenetrated by Meditation and Wisdom of the Tathagata Mahavairochana (T. 1271) (Note: 摩訶毘盧遮那如來定惠均等入三昧耶身雙身大聖歡喜天菩薩修行祕密法儀軌, pinyin: Móhēpílúzhēnà Rúlái dìnghuì jūnděng rù sānmèiyé-shēn shuāngshēn Dàshèng Huānxǐtiān púsà xiūxíng mìmì fǎ yíguǐ; Japanese: Makabirushana Nyorai jōei kintō nyū samaya-shin sōshin Daishō Kangiten Bosatsu shugyō himitsu hō giki.) describes the Dual Vinayaka ritual as a procedure to gain four kinds of benefits or siddhis (protection, gain, love and subjugation) which come in three grades: the highest grade confers kingship; the second grade provides wealth; the third grade provides sufficient food and clothing. In parallel to the material results, the tantra classifies ritual practitioners into three categories: the highest class of adept are allowed to learn the rite's inner secrets, the middle are permitted to read the text, while the lowest may not conduct the ritual on their own but should let a more developed practitioner do it for them. The text notably prescribes alcoholic beverages (considered taboo in exoteric Buddhism), dubbed the "water of bliss" (歡喜水, pinyin: huānxǐshuǐ, Japanese: kangisui), as an offering to the deity, which is then consumed as a medicine to remove evil.

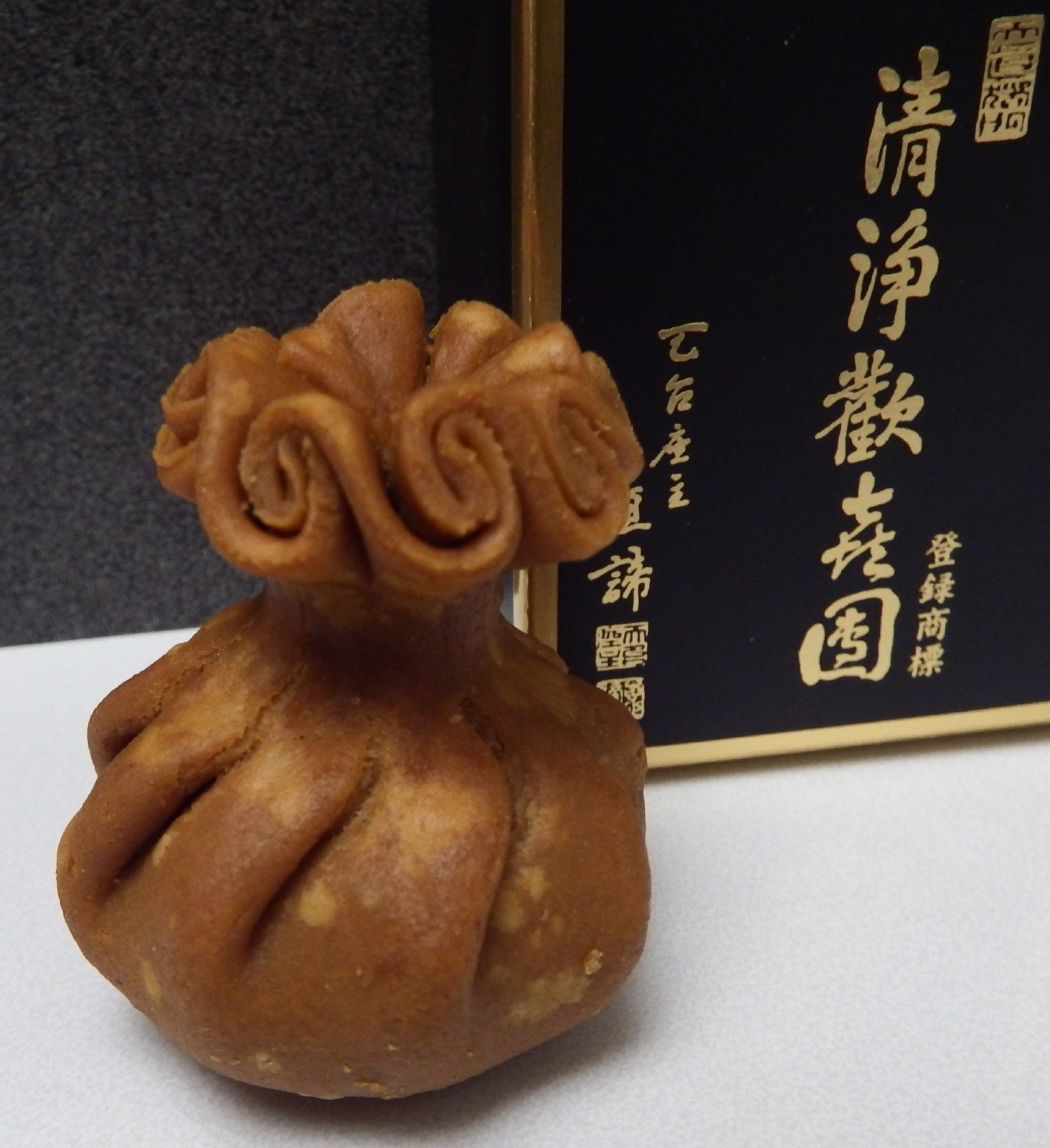
Kangidan (歓喜団, lit. "bliss bun"), a fried sweet derived from the Indian modak

Amoghavajra's disciple Hanguang (含光) composed a text in 747 called Secret Essence of the Yoga-siddhi of the Vinayaka Ganapati (T.1273) (Note: 毘那夜迦誐那鉢底瑜伽悉地品祕要, pinyin: Pínàyèjiā énàbōdǐ yújiā xīde pǐn mìyào; Japanese: Binayaka Ganahattei yuga shicchi bon hiyō.) in which he continued his master's work. He writes that every ritual should be preceded by an invocation to Vinayaka-Ganapati, the god of beginnings. This text identifies both Vinayaka and Avalokiteshvara as manifestations of the all-pervading body of the buddha Vairochana, with the pair being taken to symbolize both Vairochana's material and spiritual aspects.

A ritual manual attributed to Bodhiruci with the title The Rite of the Nine-Eyed Deva, the Provisional Manifestation of the Golden Ganapati (Note: 現金色迦那婆底九目天法, pinyin: Quánxiàn jīnsè Jiānàpódǐ Jiǔmùtiān fǎ; Japanese: Gongen konjiki Ganabachi Kumokuten hō.) describes a wrathful manifestation of Vinayaka with four arms and three heads (each with three eyes) apparently based on Tibetan forms of the deity. The manual gives instructions for the fashioning of the image, which should then be kept hidden from view at all times and offered radishes, cakes, sweets, and honey. A sutra translated by Vajrabodhi known as The Dharani Sutra of the Golden Ganapati (T. 1269) (Note: 金色迦那鉢底陀羅尼經, pinyin: Jīnsè Jiānàbōdǐ tuóluóní jīng; Japanese: Konjiki Ganahachi darani kyō.) gives instructions on how to depict a six-armed Ganapati, which should also be concealed and offered sweets such as modak (歡喜團, pinyin: huānxǐtuán; Japanese: kangidan, lit. "bliss buns"), honey, and fruits.

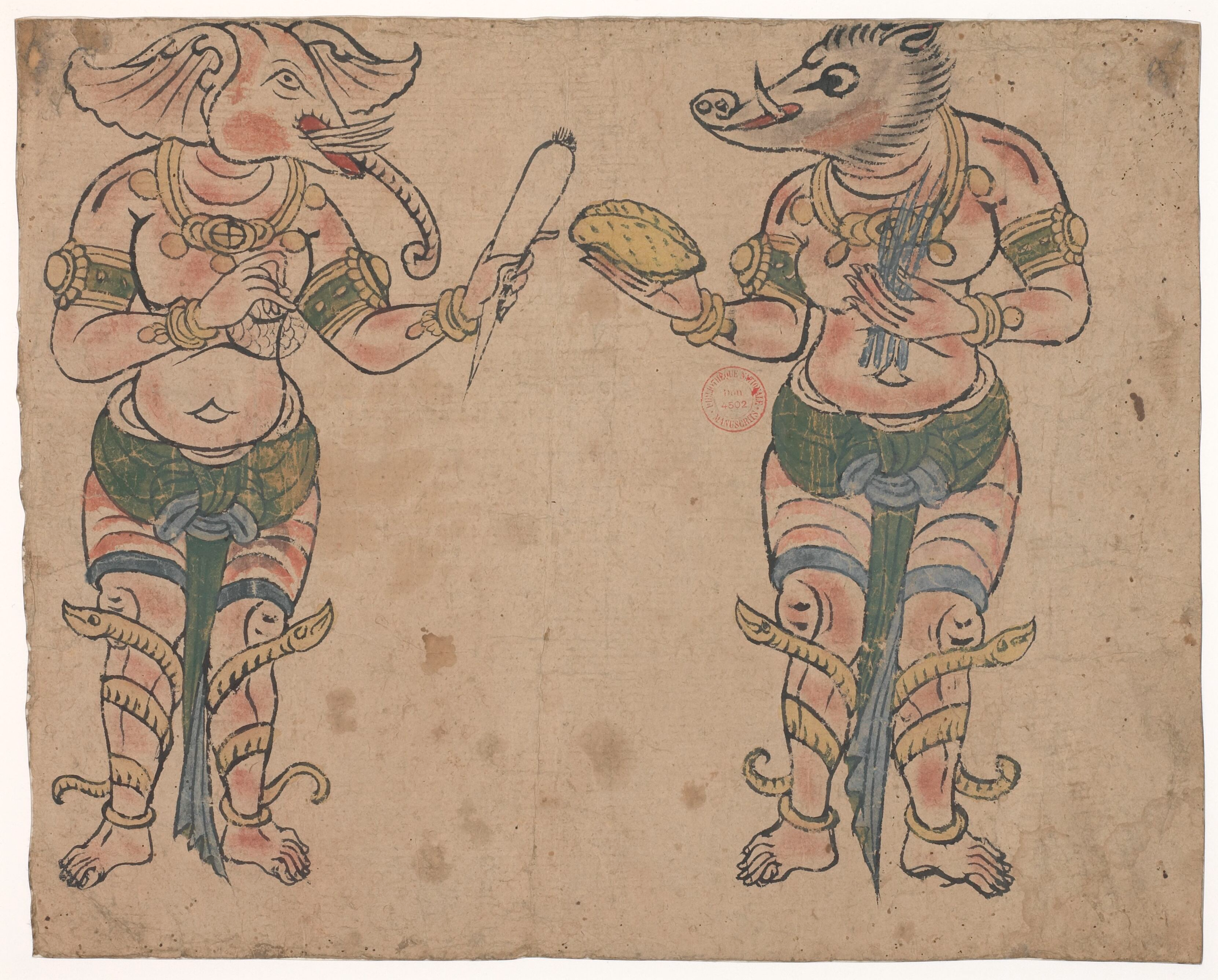
Vinayaka (holding a radish) and his boar-headed consort (holding a modak), from Dunhuang (Pelliot chinois 4518 (8))

An apocryphal sutra dating from the early 11th century, The Attainment Rites of Vinayaka taught by Vajrasattva (T. 1272) (Note: 金剛薩埵說頻那夜迦天成就儀軌經, pinyin: Jīngāngsàduǒ-shuō Pínnàyèjiātiān chéngjiù yíguǐ jīng; Japanese: Kongōsatta-setsu Binayakaten jōju giki kyō.), contains black magic spells invoking vinayakas aimed at the destruction of one's enemies. This text was deemed so gruesome that Emperor Zhenzong (reigned 997–1022) banned its circulation in China in 1017.

A minor astrological or divinatory text apocryphally attributed to Prajnachakra, another disciple of Amoghavajra who became the master of the Tendai monk Enchin (814–891), known as The Rules for the Diviner's Board of the Great Saintly Bliss Deva (T. 1275) (Note: 聖歡喜天式法, pinyin: Shèng Huānxǐtiān shìfǎ; Japanese: Shō Kangiten shikihō.) describes the outline of an esoteric divination board (式盤, Ch. shìpán; Jp. shikiban), which consisted of two parts linked by an axis: the cylindrical or conical upper part called the "heavenly board" (天盤, Ch. tiānpán; Jp. tenban), was cylindrical or conical, and the square lower part called the "earthly board" (地盤, Ch. dìpán; Jp. chiban). The practitioner is to visualize four vinayakas (all manifestations of Vinayaka-Ganapati) at each of the cardinal directions on the tenban, while the guardian deities of the eight directions (dikpala) and the Twenty-Eight Mansions of Chinese astronomy are to be visualized on the chiban. The text then lists a number of possible combinations obtained by rotating the tenban over the chiban (linking any one of the four "heavenly" vinayakas with one of the eight "earthly" directional devas), each of which produced different material benefits such as obtaining a high position, attaining marital union, making a person fall ill, or returning a curse to its sender.

Kūkai, who brought Shubhakarasimha's, Vajrabodhi's, and Amoghavajra's ritual manuals with him to Japan, is also said to have himself authored a text on Vinayaka titled the Shōten Procedural (聖天次第, Shōten shidai). The Tendai monk Ennin, too, lists the Rite of the Dual-bodied Vinayaka, the Great Saintly Deva of Bliss among the texts he obtained in China.

=== From the medieval period onwards ===
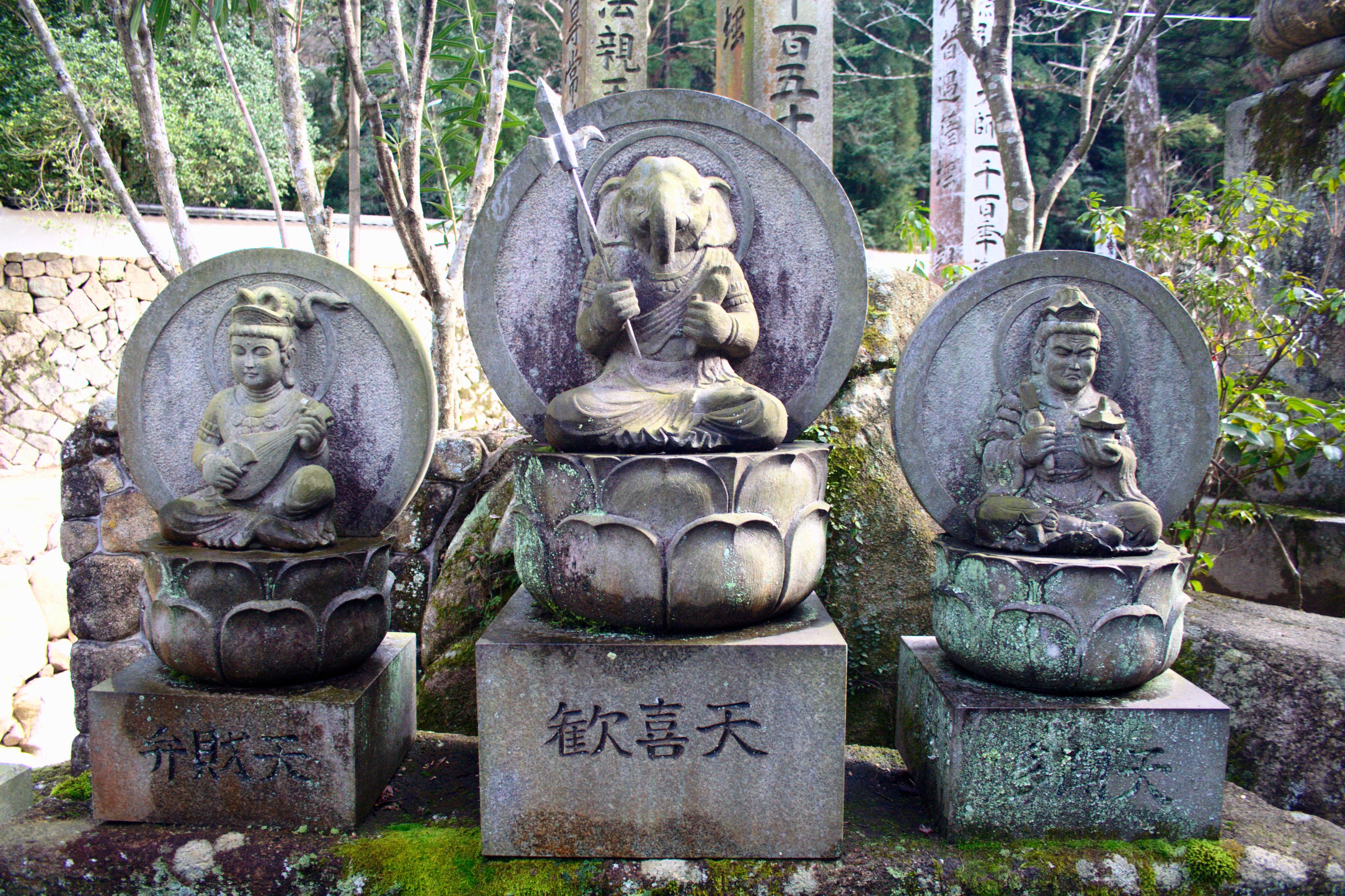
Benzaiten (left), Kangiten (center) and Tamonten (right) in Daishō-in temple (Itsukushima, Hiroshima Prefecture)

Since the Heian period, Vinayaka (Shōten / Kangiten) featured in state-sponsored official rites. These ceremonies were originally a prerogative of the imperial court: an edict dating from 785 prohibited the private performance of rites focused on a number of deities, Shōten being one of them. However, he was at times also invoked against the imperial house: in The Tale of Hōgen, the nobleman Fujiwara no Yorinaga (1120–1156) requests the performance of rituals centered on Shōten, Uchchhushma (Ususama Myōō) and Vajrakumara (金剛童子, Kongō Dōji) against Emperor Go-Shirakawa.

Shōten was commonly invoked in rites of subjugation. Legend relates that the Tendai monk Son'i (尊意, 866–940) invoked Shōten to pacify the vengeful spirit of statesman Sugawara no Michizane (later deified as Tenjin, the kami of learning), who was himself claimed to be a devotee of the god. Another story claims that when Son'i was performing a rite centered on the deity Achala (Fudō Myōō) for the end of the rebellion of Taira no Masakado in 940, a statue of Kangiten on a side altar flew eastward with the sound of a flying arrow, followed by an apparition of Masakado's head falling on the main altar, signifying his defeat.

In 1329, Emperor Go-Daigo performed a subjugation ritual invoking the god against the Kamakura shogunate; after the shogunate's regent (shikken) Hōjō Takatoki committed suicide during the Siege of Kamakura in 1333, the emperor ordered Ashikaga Takauji to establish a memorial sanctuary in Hōkai-ji, a temple in Kamakura notable for being a cultic center of Kangiten, to placate Takatoki's spirit. After the Kenmu Restoration (1333–1336), this particular Kangiten became an object of worship of the Ashikaga shogunate and the remnants of the Hōjō clan. In 1433, the monks of Mount Hiei conducted a Shōten rite against the sixth Ashikaga shōgun Yoshinori.

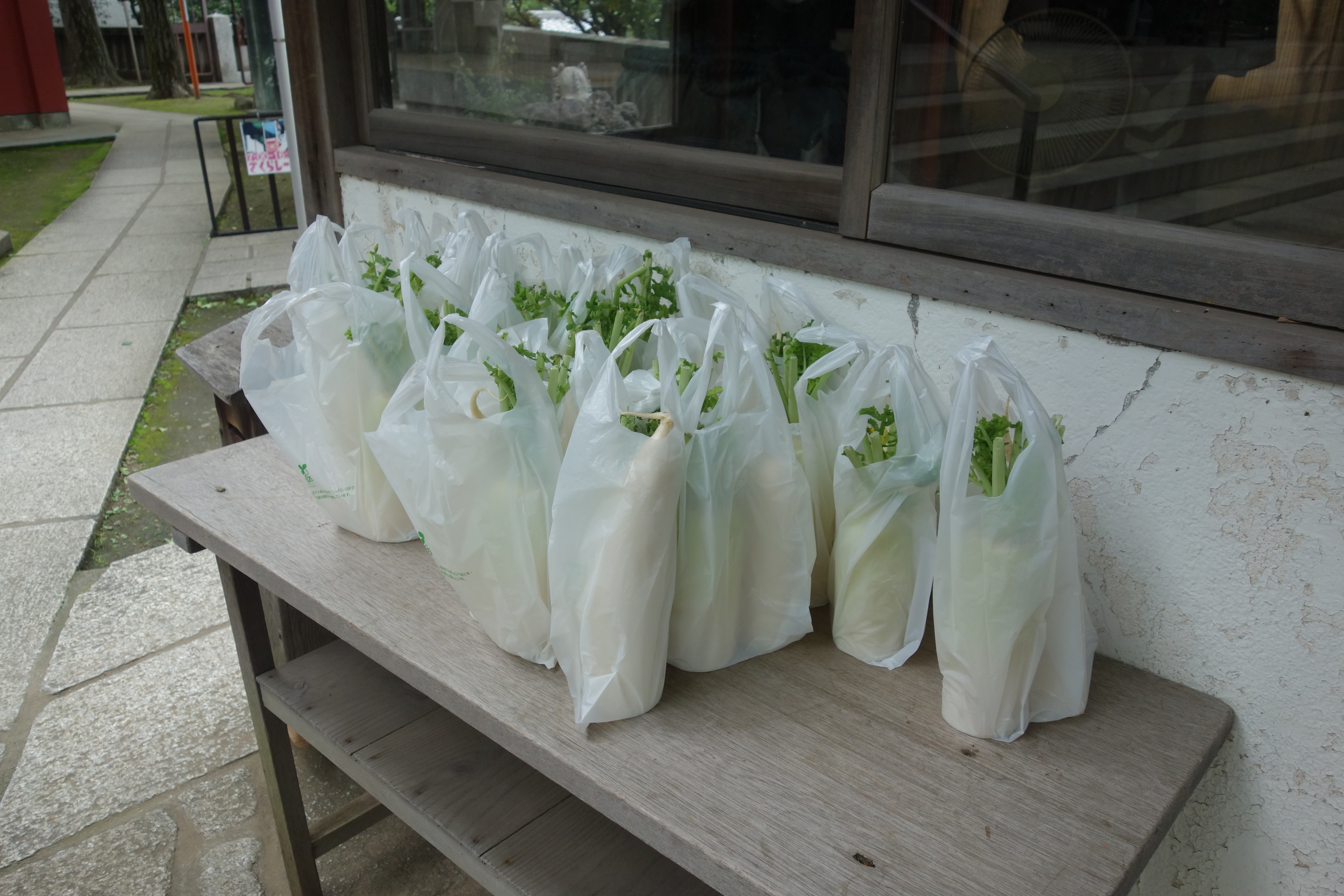
Daikon offered to Kangiten made available to devotees (お下がり, o-sagari; cf. the Hindu prasāda) at Matsuchiyama Honryū-in (Matsuchiyama Shōden), Asakusa, Taitō City, Tokyo

Historical figures known to have been devoted to Shōten (and whose successes were sometimes credited to him) include the famous warlords Toyotomi Hideyoshi and Tokugawa Ieyasu, the Edo period merchants Kinokuniya Bunzaemon and Takadaya Kahei, the daimyō and political reformer Matsudaira Sadanobu, and wealthy business families such as the Mitsui, the Sumitomo, and the Kōnoike. The 15th century Noh playwright Konparu Zenchiku was also devoted to the god since his youth; during a twenty-one day retreat at Fushimi Inari Shrine with his wife (a daughter of his master Zeami) in 1467, the 63-year old Zenchiku consumed a talisman of the deity while praying for the "harmonious union of yin and yang, husband and wife." Upon being told by a priest that his prayer was not answered because he had no karmic connection with Shōten, Zenchiku repented of his negligence and renewed his vow, eventually receiving a dream that deepened his faith.

Little is known regarding premodern devotion to Shōten outside of the ruling classes other than that it spread during the Edo period, all the while still remaining relatively arcane. A certain legend claims that Ieyasu attempted to stake a claim on the deity by promoting rumors of Shōten being a fearsome god whose efficacy is counterbalanced by his fickleness and quick temper, thus keeping the cult's growth among the general populace in check. This, the story claims, is the reason why he is not as popular in the Kantō region (the Tokugawa seat of power) as he is in western Japan, where he is widely worshiped even today.

Perhaps in reaction against the deity's reputation among the public as one who grants any and all material desires, various sources emphasize the ineffectiveness and even danger of performing rituals on one's own, without the aid of a qualified priest. The Tendai monk Kōkei (977–1049) warned that while the benefits brought by the god are very real, he is swift to curse negligent practitioners; it is thus better for people in this Final Age not to worship him. The 18th-century tradesman and kokugaku scholar Tsumura Sōan writes the following regarding Kangiten:

Kangiten is an Indian god, and because he brings many benefits, many are those who perform his rite by themselves. But even if one's spirit of faith is deep, it is better not to perform by oneself, by chanting dhāraṇīs and the like. Whatever their spirit of faith, ordinary people, when they practice without sufficient respect, commit a severe offence. One must ask a monk to recite prayers. ... Kangiten is the lord of the world of desire. As he made a vow to help even evil people abandoned by the Worthies and the Buddhas, when evil people address their prayers to him, even if they are about to be beheaded, he can save them. Because he is the lord of the world of desire, he fulfills all prayers, even those made with a thought of desire. (But because there are in his retinue unruly gods that are easily offended by lack of respect, he must be approached with caution.) Even among Ritsu monks who perform the ritual of Kangiten, many fall into sexual desire. Generally speaking, in India, this is a rite performed by profanes.

A notable modern-day Shōten devotee is the entrepreneur and Buddhist scholar Hayashiya Tomojirō (林屋友次郎, 1886–1953), who authored A Guide to Shōten Devotion (聖天信仰の手引き, Shōten shinkō no tebiki), a manual instructing lay worshipers (specifically new devotees) the proper manner of worshiping the deity.

== Mythology ==
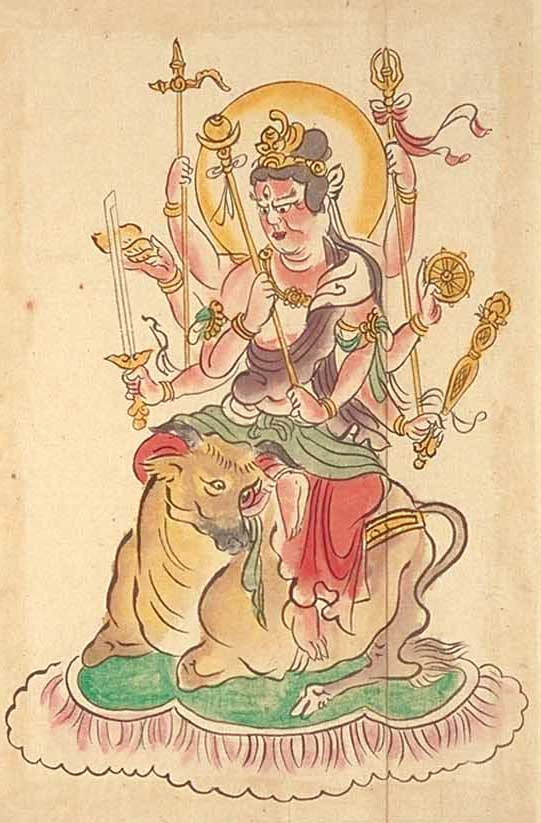
Maheshvara (Daijizaiten)

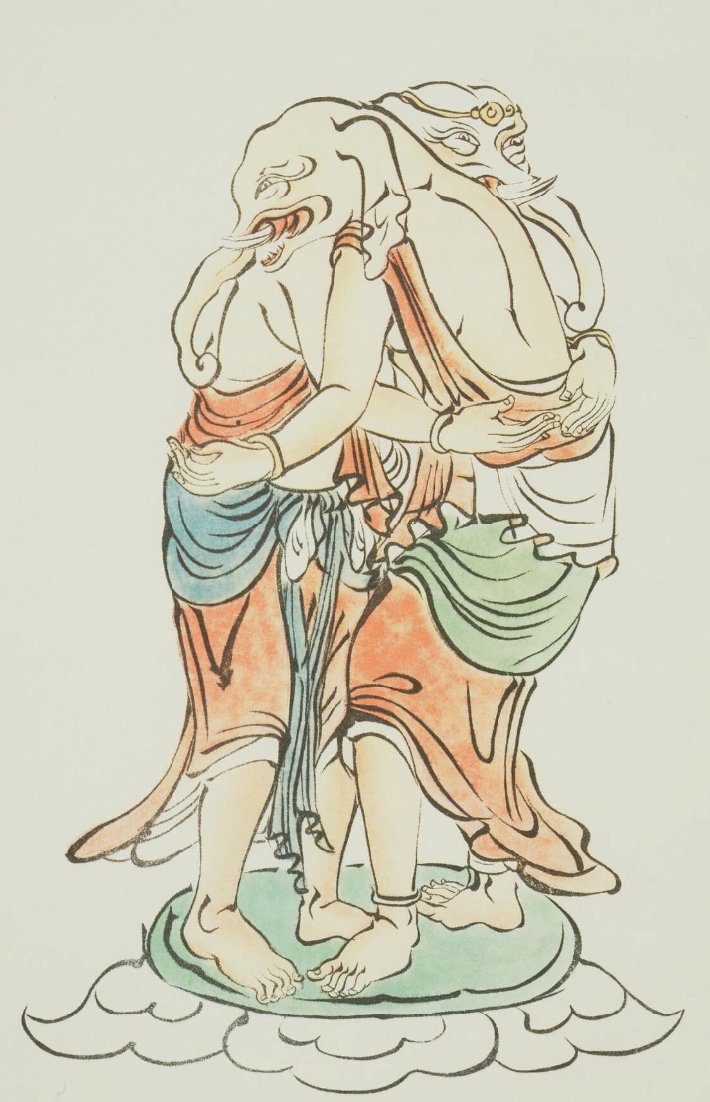
Dual-bodied Kangiten (''Sōshin Kangiten''), from the Entsūji manuscript of the ''Zuzōshō'', c. 1310.

A number of texts relate different stories regarding the origin and meaning of the Dual Vinayaka image.

According to the story found in Shubhakarasimha's ritual manual, Maheshvara's wife Uma (Parvati) gave birth to three thousand children: from her left side was born 1,500 evil deities headed by King Vinayaka (毘那夜迦王), while from her right side came 1,500 benevolent deities led by King Senayaka (扇那夜迦王; Pali: Senāyaka; Sanskrit: Senanāyaka, "commander" or "lord of the army"), who was actually the incarnation of Avalokiteshvara. In order to subdue Vinayaka's evil deeds, Senayaka "took simultaneous birth with Vinayaka so that they would be younger and elder brother, husband and wife." Reborn as his wife, Senayaka embraced Vinayaka, thereby calming his rage and turning him into a force for good.

In another legend recorded in a medieval Japanese iconographic compendium known as the Kakuzenshō (覚禅鈔), Vinayaka was originally the king of a country called Marakeira, who only ate beef and radishes. When these became rare, he started feasting on human corpses; when these too became scarce, he began to eat living people. His subjects eventually revolted and were about to kill the king when he transformed himself into "the great demon king Vinayaka." The kingdom was then struck by an epidemic (implied to have been caused by the demon), at which the people prayed to the Eleven-Headed (Ekadashamukha) Avalokiteshvara, who took the form of a female vinayaka and seduced the demon king, filling him with joy (歓喜, kangi) and pacifying him. Thus, he, in union with her, became the Dual Kangiten.

A third tale somewhat similar to the above found in another Japanese text portrays Vinayaka (Kangi) as the head of a vast army of vinayaka demons who lived in a mountain called Mount Vinayaka, also known as "Elephant-headed Mountain" (象頭山, Zōzu-sen) or "Mountain of Obstacles" (障礙山, Shōge-san), who received a command from Maheshvara (who at the time had not yet converted to Buddhism) to cause trouble to humans and steal their vital essence. To tame him, Avalokiteshvara manifested himself as a female vinayaka and came before the demon king. Upon seeing the demoness, Kangi immediately fell in love with her, but she agreed to become his consort only if he abandoned his evil ways and embraced Buddhism. After Kangi assented, the demoness took him in her arms, leading the king to achieve great bliss (kangi). A variant of this story portrays Shōten (here identified as female) as a daughter of Maheshvara who was exiled to Mount Vinayaka because of her ugliness and her violent nature. In the mountain, she meets a god who courts her. She replies that she is already wed to another deity named Gundari (Amritakundalin) but agrees to marry him if he reforms himself. (Still other versions in which Vinayaka is male portray Gundari as a goddess.)

Yet another story relates that Vinayaka was originally a courtier in an Indian kingdom nicknamed the "Long-Nosed Minister" (鼻長大臣, Bichō Daijin) who had an intimate liaison with the queen. After discovering their affair, the king poisons Bichō Daijin by making him eat elephant meat. The queen tells her lover to run away to Mount Keira (Mount Kailash) and cure himself by bathing in oil and eating radishes. After recovering, Bichō Daijin swore vengeance against the king and transformed into a fearsome elephant-headed "great god of obstacles" (大障礙神, dai-shōgeshin) named Vinayaka. Storming into the palace with his army of demons, Vinayaka confessed to the queen his lust for her. In reply, the queen bade him repent of his evil ways and embraced him, "her body [becoming] as his in form." Thus Vinayaka was freed from his base desires and attained great bliss.

== Association with other deities ==
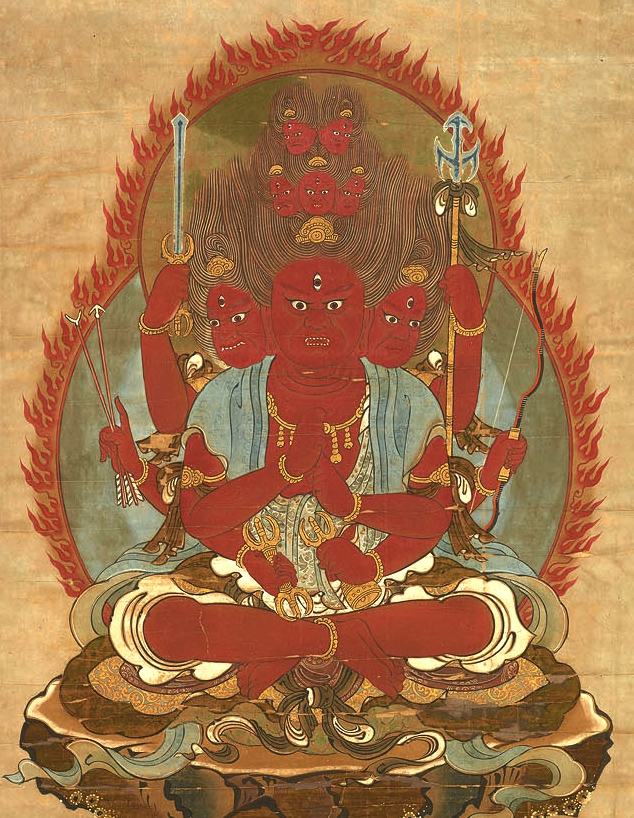
Sanbō Kōjin ("fierce god (kōjin) of the Three Jewels"), the Japanese Buddhist god of the hearth

Kangiten is commonly identified as an "assimilation / emanation body" (等流身, tōrujin; Sanskrit: niṣyanda-kāya) of Vairochana, with the female half of the embracing pair being also identified as a manifestation of the Eleven-Headed Avalokiteshvara. In addition to these two, he was also connected or identified with other deities such as Maheshvara-Daijizaiten, the wrathful hearth god Sanbō Kōjin, the snake god Ugajin, Enma (Yama), Benzaiten (Sarasvati), the fox goddess Dakiniten, and the wisdom king Aizen Myōō (Ragaraja).

Whereas some sources identify Shōten as Maheshvara's son – which reflects Shiva's and Ganesha's relationship in Hindu mythology – others also identify him as Maheshvara's incarnation. The Shingon monk Kakuban for instance wrote:

"[In the dual form] the male deva is a transformation body of Maheshvara. He drives off both celestial and earthly demons and distributes profit in this world and the next. The female figure is a transformation of Avalokiteshvara's eleven-faced form, the most potent of her thirty-three forms. These two standing in conjugal embrace represent the union of yin and yang. That they have elephant heads and human bodies is to show the interpenetration of all ten realms."

In another text, 'Daijizaiten' is one of the various names for the deity:

"Because he is perfectly free in the six supranormal powers and secret dharmas, he is called Shōten. Because he is perfectly free in wisdom, he is called Daijizaiten. Because he achieves love, he is called the dual-bodied Vinayaka king. Because he produces the five cereals, he is called the six-armed deva."

This identification of Shōten with Daijizaiten was however criticized in the hagiography of Shingon Ritsu monk Tankai (1629–1721), the founder of Hōzan-ji (Ikoma Shōten), which relates that Tankai, after having doubts about Shōten's true nature, had a dream in which the god explained that he is neither Daijizaiten nor a mere vinayaka demon but an avatar of Vairochana; although he is called 'Vinayaka' because the vinayakas are members of his retinue, he, unlike them, is not a malignant demon of obstacles. Tankai's doubts were eventually resolved after finding a copy of the Kakuzenshō, which claimed that identifying Shōten with Maheshvara-Daijizaiten is "a great error" and that "this divinity's special characteristic is that of lord of siddhis, thus he is called 'Jizaiten'. He ought not to be confused with any other jizaiten."

A tradition of the Jimon Tendai temple of Mii-dera meanwhile associates Shōten with the demon king Mara, also known as Takejizaiten (他化自在天; Skt. Paranirmitavaśavartin), the lord of the sixth and highest heaven in the world of desire who once tried to hinder Gautama Buddha's quest for enlightenment (though he is also said to have eventually converted to Buddhism). Indeed, the Mii-dera tradition employs Takejizaiten's mantra in Shōten rituals rather than Daijizaiten's.

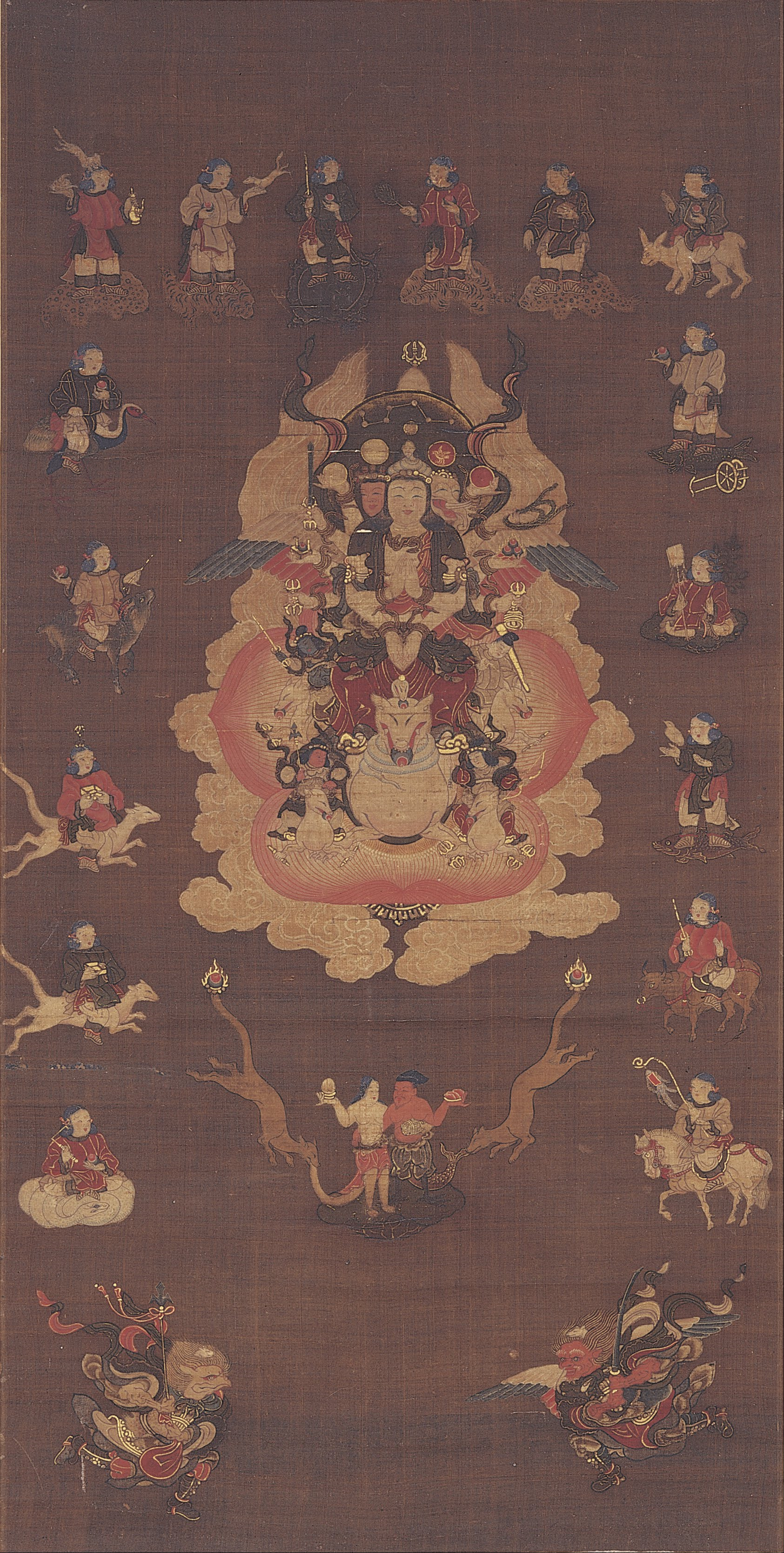
Dakiniten Mandala (Muromachi period, 15th century), portraying the combined Dakiniten (central figure), Benzaiten (left head), and Shōten (right head)

Shōten was also equated with Sanbō Kōjin, in that the latter was also considered to be a violent deity (kōjin) of obstacles. According to a work attributed to the Tendai monk Annen called the Ritual of Vinayaka in Four Sections (Shibu Binayaka-hō, 四部毘那夜迦法), when the construction of Jetavana Monastery suffered a series of delays due to obstructive evil spirits, their leader, a fierce-looking eight-headed deity, appeared before the Buddha's disciple Shariputra, calling himself Nagyōtosajin (那行都佐神), the "Raging King of the Three Jewels" (三宝荒王, Sanbō Kōō). He then demanded that Shariputra create an image of him and make offerings to it, warning that all kinds of calamities will befall those who do not pay him homage. A gloss in the text explains: "It is Kōjin, or Vinayaka." The story is repeated in the Sannō Shinto text Shintō Zatsuzatsushū (神道雑々集): here, the god identifies himself explicitly as 'Sanbō Kōjin Binayaka' (三宝荒神毘那夜迦). Like Kangiten, Kōjin (Nagyōtosajin) was interpreted as being either a single deity or a pair of deities named respectively Nagyō (那行) and Tosa (都佐). (In a similar vein, some representations of Kangiten split the god's name into two, naming the male half of the pair as 'Bina' and his female consort as 'Yaka'.) In addition, Kōjin was also sometimes identified with Maheshvara-Daijizaiten and was associated with one of Vinayaka's symbols (三昧耶形, sa(n)maya-gyō; Skt. samaya), the parasol (傘蓋, sangai).

In an apocryphal sutra titled Dharani Sutra of the Buddha's Teaching for the Greatest Protection of the Country by Ugaya's Sudden Attainment Wish-Fulfilling Jewel, (Note: 仏説最勝護国宇賀耶頓得如意宝珠陀羅尼経; Japanese: Bussetsu saishō gokoku Ugaya tontoku nyōihōju darani-kyō.) Ugajin (who is closely associated with Benzaiten) is said to manifest himself as the deities Dakiniten, Daishōten (Vinayaka), and Aizen Myōō. Another text identifies Vinayaka with the goddess of Itsukushima Shrine, who was also identified with Benzaiten.

During the medieval period, Benzaiten, Dakiniten, and Shōten were also combined into a single figure which served as the main focus of an esoteric imperial accession rite in which the three deities were worshiped as one known as the Joint Ritual of the Three Devas (三天合行法, santen gogyōhō). The union of these three divinities was associated with a series of triads such as the three jewels (Buddha, Dharma, and Sangha), the three poisons (greed, ignorance, and hatred), the three mysteries (body, speech, and mind), and the three shrines that comprise Fushimi Inari Shrine (due to her association with foxes, Dakiniten was identified with the native god Inari). Portrayals of the three devas as a single figure, which became popular during the Nanboku-chō and Muromachi periods and were still being produced as late as the Edo period, depict the composite deity as a three-headed figure riding a fox. The middle head is usually that of Dakiniten, though some show Shōten as occupying the central position.

Shōten was also identified with various Japanese gods such as Susanoo, Amaterasu, Sarutahiko and his wife Ame-no-Uzume (an identification which may have partly stemmed from Sarutahiko's long nose calling to mind Shōten's elephant trunk), or the crossroad deities known as Dōsojin (which are sometimes represented as a human couple).

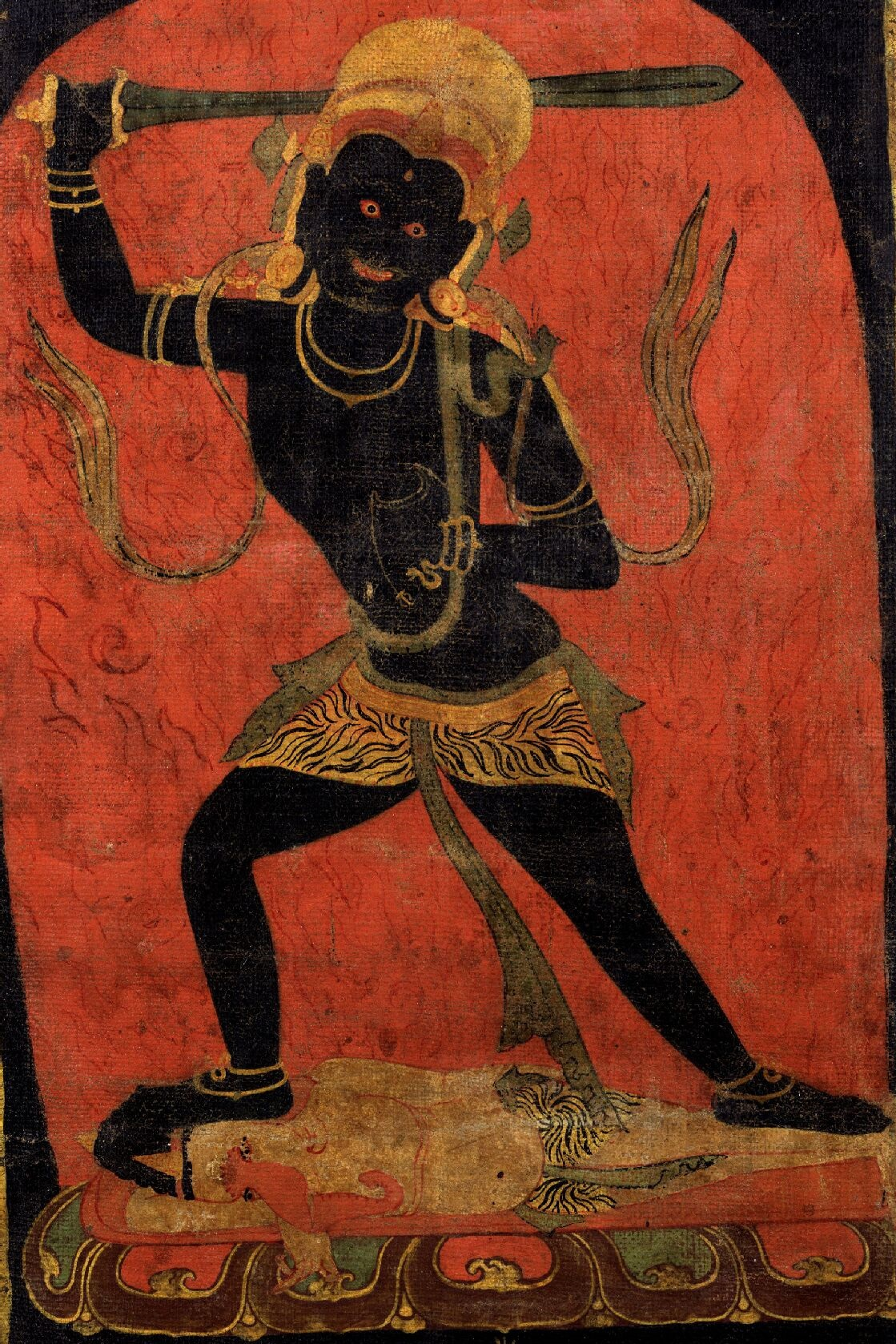
12th century Tibetan (Kadampa school) painting of Achala stepping on Vighnaraja

Apart from Avalokiteshvara, various wrathful deities such as Jinja Daishō (深沙大将, lit. "General Deep Sands"; a fierce avatar of Vaishravana), Uchchhushma (Ususama), Achala (Fudō), or Amritakundalin (Gundari Myōō) are also believed to subjugate Vinayaka (when interpreted as the cause of obstacles) and his vinayaka underlings and keep them under control. Indeed, Amritakundalin is said to be particularly effective against the vinayakas; their leader Shōten himself is also said to belong to his retinue.

=== Gonrui and jitsurui ===
Medieval Japanese thought classified Buddhist devas and native kami into two types: gonsha (権者) or gonrui (権類), deities who are "provisional" manifestations (gongen) of enlightened buddhas and bodhisattvas, and jissha (実者) or jitsurui (実類), "real" or "material" lesser divinities who have the same passions and desires as humans do. In this latter category are also included deified lower entities such as animal spirits or spirits of the dead. Jitsurui deities, due to their nature, are approached with caution, with some sources even recommending that they are best avoided.

Esoteric texts distinguish three kinds of Kangiten rituals, each of which classified Vinayaka and his consort differently:

- The first one considers the male as a jitsurui deity and the female as a provisional incarnation. The honzon or focus of worship in this rite is thus called "provisional and real devas" (権実の天, gonjitsu no ten).
- In the second, both deities are considered jitsurui; the honzon in this case is called "devas both real" (倶実の天, kujitsu no ten). This type of ritual is considered the most effective but also the most dangerous.
- The third one visualizes both deities as gonrui; its honzon is therefore known as "devas both provisional" (倶権の天, kugon no ten). Although its effects are not as quick or apparent, it is considered the safest of the three types.

These distinctions merely reflect the perspective of the practitioner; the image used in these rituals does not change.

== Iconography ==
=== Single and dual forms ===
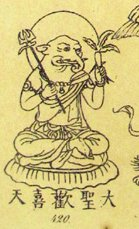
Depiction of the single-bodied Kangiten holding an axe and a daikon

Shōten (Kangiten) is mainly depicted either alone or, more commonly, embracing his consort. When shown by himself, he is represented with either two, four, six, eight or even twelve arms, holding various attributes such as a vajra, an axe, a noose, a club, a trident, a wheel, a broken tusk or a radish (which may have itself developed from the tusk attribute). He notably does not have the Hindu Ganesha's characteristic huge belly nor the latter's animal mount (vāhana), the mouse. Some depictions portray him with one tusk similar to Ganesha, although others show both his tusks intact.

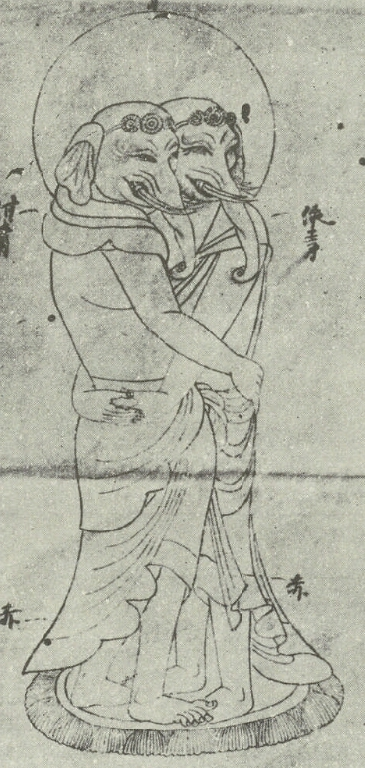
Depiction of the dual-bodied Kangiten with both figures facing forward

Among the various representations of the deity, the single-bodied Shōten image is considered the most difficult and even dangerous to own and maintain due to the god's wild nature; an image of the Eleven-Headed Avalokiteshvara (Jūichimen Kannon) is thus also installed in temples that enshrine the single-bodied Shōten in the belief that this pacifies the deity. Images of this type are employed in an esoteric rite known as the Kangiten Water Ritual (水歓喜天供, Sui Kangiten-ku), in which water that had been used to bathe the statue of Avalokiteshvara is poured over the image, which is then taken by ritual practitioners and devotees for their use. Bathing in this consecrated water is believed to cleanse impurities and remove all impediments.

The Dual-bodied Kangiten image usually features both the male and female figures with elephant heads, though a few examples show the female figure as boar-headed. The genders of the pair are not explicit but hinted in the iconography. The female is often shown wearing a crown and resting her feet over that of the male, who rests his head on her shoulder. Some variants may show the male and female gazing at each other, looking over each other's shoulders, wearing a single shared garment, or standing side by side. A few images of the deity classified as gonjitsu depictions may depict the female alone stepping on the male's foot (symbolizing the jitsurui deity Vinayaka being subjugated by Avalokiteshvara's provisional incarnation), while kugon depictions – where both the male and female are interpreted as incarnations of bodhisattvas – may show both the two figures stepping on the other's foot. This symbolizes the unity and non-duality of contrasting genders and opposites.

Although Amoghavajra's Rite of the Dual-bodied Vinayaka recommends that Vinayaka's image be made of pewter, brass, or wood and be about five or seven sun (approximately 17–20 centimeters) high, most sculptures of Kangiten venerated in Japanese temples are much smaller, measuring around one to two sun (3–6 centimeters) on average. Because they are periodically ritually bathed in oil, many are made of metals such as gold, silver, bronze, or iron; wooden images (木天, mokuten) are comparatively rare.

=== Vajra vinayakas ===
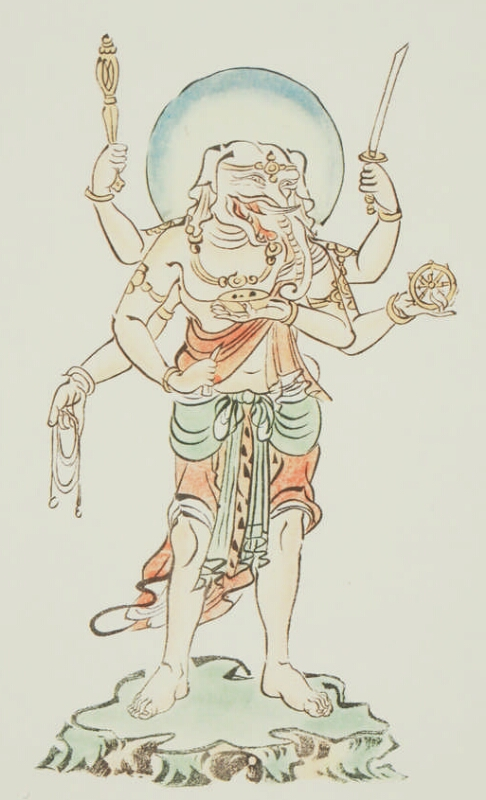
Six-armed Shōten

The twenty deities depicted in the outer sections of the Diamond Realm mandala include Vinayaka (shown holding a radish and a modak), a boar-headed deity known as Vajramukha (金剛面天, Kongōmenten; sometimes identified with either the goddess Chamunda – depicted in Buddhist art with a boar's head – or Vinayaka's consort), and four vinayakas distributed along the four directions:

1. Vajravikirana / Vajrachinna (金剛摧天, Kongō-zaiten; Skt. Vajracinna, "destroying vajra deva"): The vinayaka of the east, shown holding an umbrella. His name reflects his role as the destroyer of obstacles caused by malevolent vinayakas. Also known as Sangaiten (傘蓋天, "parasol deva") or Sangai Binayaka (傘蓋毘那夜迦, "parasol vinayaka").
2. Vajrabhakshana (金剛食天, Kongō-jikiten / 金剛飲食天, Kongō-onjikiten; Skt. Vajrabhakṣana, "vajra deva of drink and food"): Situated in the south, this vinayaka holds a garland of flowers in his right hand and sometimes a noose in his left hand. Also called Keman Binayaka (華鬘毘那夜迦, "flower garland vinayaka").
3. Vajravasin (金剛衣天, Kongō-eten / 金剛衣服天, Kongō-ebukuten; Skt. Vajravāsin, "vajra deva of clothing"): The vinayaka of the west, depicted holding a bow and arrow. Also called Kōkyūsen Binayaka (拘弓箭毘那夜迦, "bow-and-arrow-wielding vinayaka").
4. Vajrajaya (金剛調伏天, Kongō-chōbukuten / 調伏天, Chōbukuten; "subduing [vajra] deva"): Situated in the north, shown holding a sword or a staff or club in his right hand and a jewel in his left. Also known as Kōtō Binayaka (拘刀毘那夜迦, "sword-wielding vinayaka") or Konjiki Ganahattei (金色迦那鉢底, "golden Ganapati"). Although all four are depicted with elephant heads in the Diamond Realm mandala, the Kakuzenshō portrays three of the four vinayakas as human figures, with Vajrajaya being the only one shown as elephant-headed.

=== Other depictions ===
Kangi Dōji (歓喜童子), a depiction of Kangiten as a young boy (童子, dōji)

A mandala centered on Kangiten shows the dual-bodied form of the deity at the center of a four-petaled lotus arm-in-arm as if dancing, surrounded by the four directional vinayakas and the guardian devas of the eight directions. Two six-armed vinayakas are sometimes also depicted at the mandala's bottom part.

A depiction commonly found in hanging scrolls and talismans (ofuda) known as Kangi Dōji (歓喜童子) shows Shōten as a sitting human youth (童子, dōji) with one or two elephant heads on his headgear. He has four (or rarely eight) arms holding an axe or a halberd, a jeweled staff, a modak, and a radish. This image was popularized by the 17th century Shingon monk Ikū (以空, 1637–1719), who is said to have seen Shōten in this manner after praying that the god show himself in a form that can be displayed in public (unlike his elephant-headed forms).

== Worship ==
=== Bīja and mantra ===
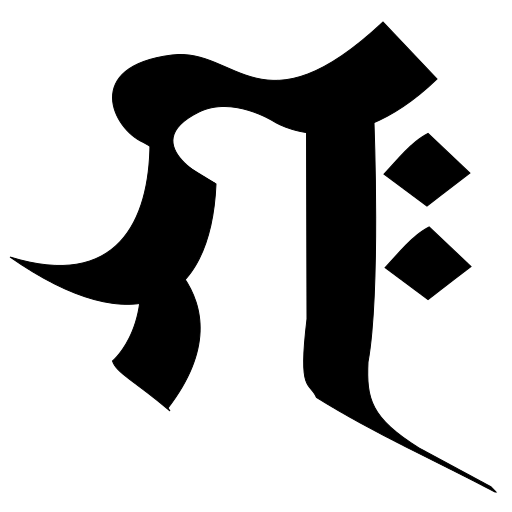
गः (gaḥ), Shōten's seed syllable (bīja) in Siddham script

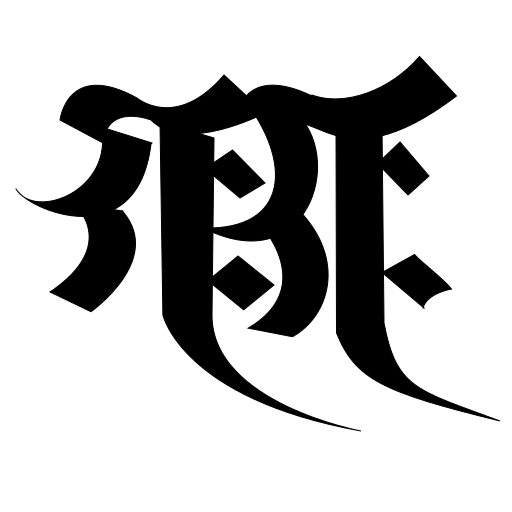
Doubled gaḥ

The bīja or seed syllable used to represent Shōten is gaḥ (Devanagari: गः; Japanese pronunciation: gyaku), written in Siddham script. It is usually written double (गःगः), symbolizing his dual form.

The mantra considered to be the standard in Japanese Buddhism, identified in Amoghavajra's Rite of the Dual-bodied Vinayaka as Vinayaka's "heart mantra" (心呪), is as follows:

Sanskrit (romanized)	Devanagari	Japanese (romanized)	Hiragana
Oṃ hrīḥ gaḥ huṃ svāhā	ॐ ह्रीः गः हुं स्वाहा	On kiri(ku) gyaku un sowaka	おん きり（く） ぎゃく うん そわか

The mantra is traditionally interpreted as Vinayaka's seed syllable flanked by those of Avalokiteshvara ( / ह्रीः, hrīḥ) and Amritakundalin ( / हुं, huṃ), the two figures who subjugated him.

=== Rituals ===
Shōten is ritually worshiped via a number of rites:

==== Oil Bath (Yokuyu-ku) ====
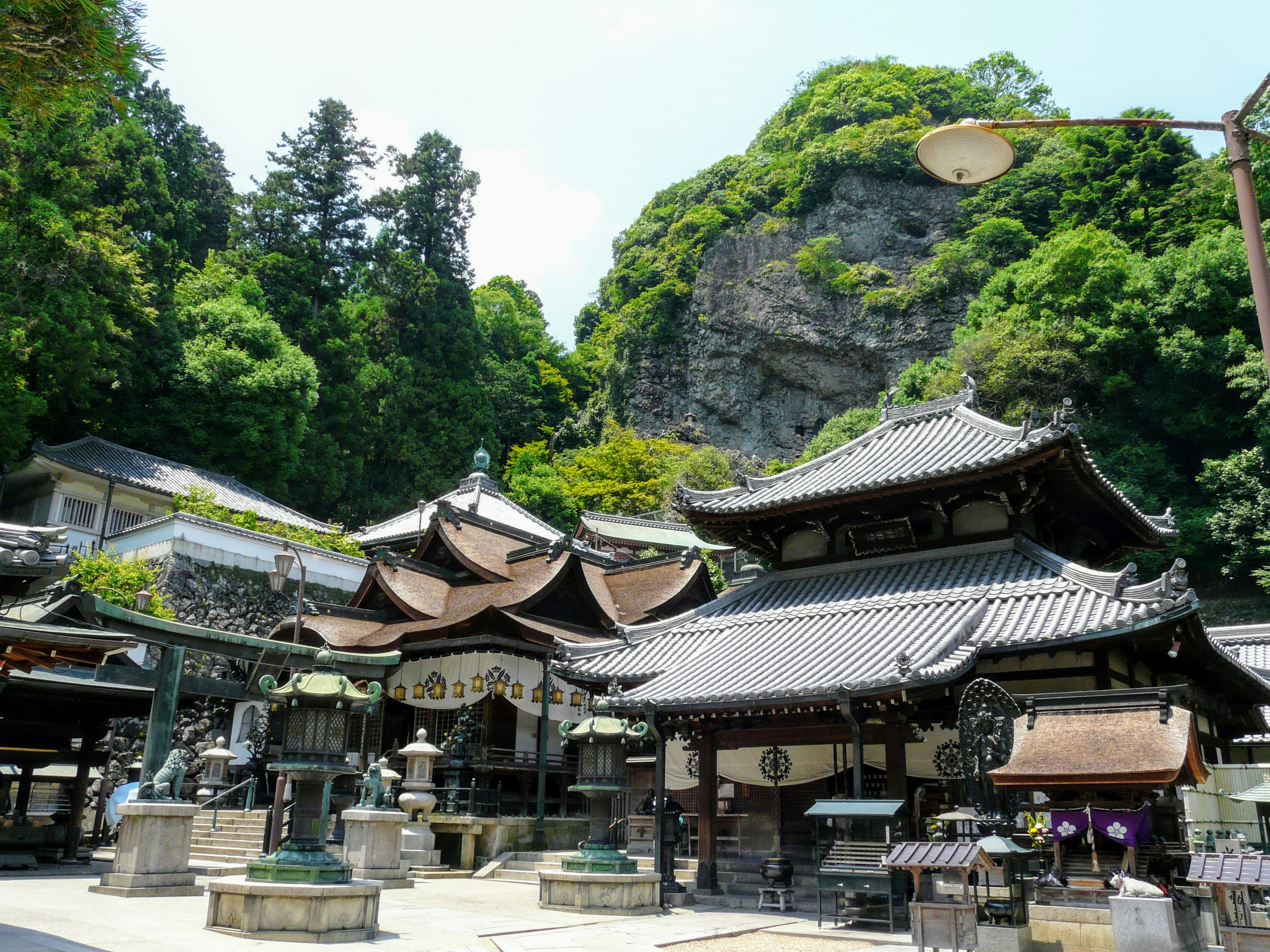
Hōzan-ji (Ikoma Shōten) in Ikoma, Nara Prefecture

The Oil Bath Ritual (浴油供, Yokuyu-ku) involves placing a statue of Kangiten on a brass basin and pouring (abhisheka) consecrated warm oil on it using a ladle 108 times, a process that is repeated for seven days. Perfumed pure sesame oil is commonly used for the rite, though tradition claims that it originally employed ghee mixed with honey (蘇蜜油, somitsu-yu). It is considered the most sacred and potent of the deity's rituals but also the most arcane: it is restricted to monks who have received proper initiation into the rite (performance by unqualified individuals is strictly forbidden) and is conducted outside of the public gaze.

The ritual is symbolically interpreted as representing Vinayaka's conversion and initiation (abhisheka) into the Buddhist path, during which the former demon king's evil nature and mental defilements (kleshas) are washed away, thereby revealing his true nature as a manifestation of Vairochana Buddha. Likewise, it is believed to purify the practitioner and devotees as well.

==== Flower-Water Offering (Kesui-ku) ====
The Flower-Water Ritual (華水供, Kesui-ku) involves offering water scented with flowers, incense, and/or shikimi (Illicium anisatum) leaves to Buddhist divinities in lieu of food and drink. The practice is thought to have derived from the precept that forbade those who have taken monastic vows (which includes the Buddhist devas) from eating anything after noon.

In practice, however, the Kesui-ku performed in many Shōten temples denotes a ceremony mostly similar in structure to the Oil Bath rite but without the bathing of the deity's image in oil. In this case, Shōten is offered not just flowers and water, but also other types of foodstuffs.

==== Other rites ====
In some temples, rituals such as the Daihannya Tendoku (大般若転読), in which a group of monks symbolically 'read' the 600-fascicle Mahaprajnaparamita Sutra (大般若経, Daihannya-kyō) by flipping through (転読, tendoku, lit. "rolling reading") copies of portions of the text, and Hyakumi Kuyō (百味供養, lit. "Offering of One Hundred Foods"), in which an extravagant amount of fruits, vegetables, and other delicacies are offered to Shōten, are performed upon request as thanksgiving for prayers answered.

=== Offerings ===
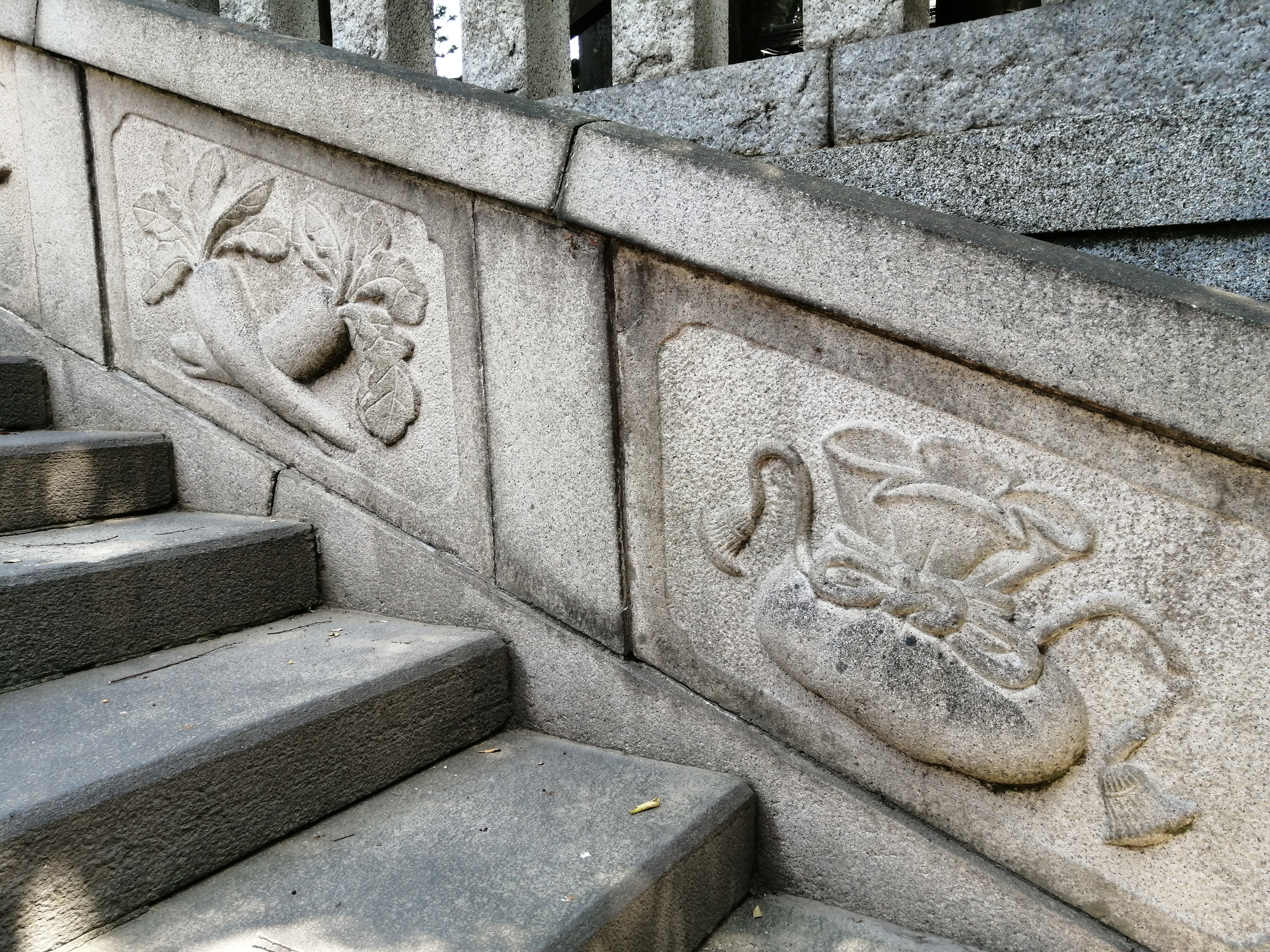
Kangiten's symbols depicted on the steps of Matsuchiyama Honryū-in: the forked daikon (二股大根, futamata daikon), symbolizing fertility and marital union, and the money bag (巾着, kinchaku), representing wealth

Like his Hindu counterpart Ganesha, Shōten is held to be partial to sweets. Common offerings to Shōten include rice wine (sake), radishes (daikon), and sweets filled with red bean paste (anko) such as kangidan (歓喜団, "bliss buns"), a deep-fried confection stuffed with spiced anko based on the Indian modak, Ganesha's favorite food. Conversely, offering him sour citrus fruits, pears, mushrooms, lotus root (renkon), and dishes which go against the Buddhist vegetarian diet (i.e. those containing meat, fish, or pungent vegetables such as garlic or scallions) is considered taboo.

Daikon radishes are interpreted as representing the three poisons (specifically dvesha or hatred); offering the vegetable to the deity is thus held to be a meritorious purificatory act. At the same time, because radishes are also popularly believed to aid digestion, they also symbolize Shōten's action of removing the three poisons.

=== Reputation ===
Shōten is popularly regarded as a powerful, efficacious deity who readily grants whatever is asked of him, including impossible or even immoral wishes. He is sometimes called "Vairochana's final expedient incarnation" (大日如来最後の方便身, Dainichi Nyorai saigo no hōbenshin) because he is believed to be the last resort of those who have no other recourse. At the same time, his reputation has sometimes also caused him to be characterized negatively as highly demanding and temperamental, requiring constant attention from his devotees and harassing or punishing those who have either become lax in their devotion or quit worshiping him altogether.

An oft-repeated urban legend claims that worshiping Shōten is a double-edged sword as it uses up seven generations' worth of good karma at once; in other words, it confers immediate gratification to the worshiper but also eventually brings about their downfall. However, in his A Guide to Shōten Devotion, Hayashiya Tomojirō criticized this as a "baseless, superstitious legend" that should be ignored.

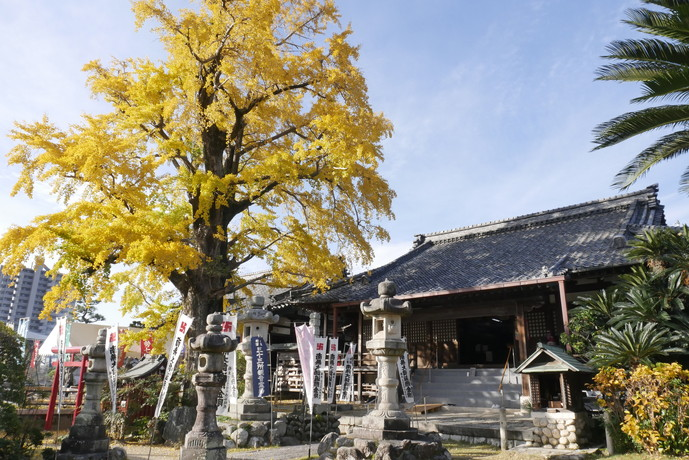
Daifukuden-ji (Kuwana Shōten) in Kuwana, Mie Prefecture

In the past, Shōten's cult was widespread among gamblers, actors, geisha, and people in the pleasure quarters. During the Edo period, he was also widely venerated by merchants, especially vegetable-oil sellers. Even today, he is mainly worshiped for success in love, relationships, and business. Devotion to Shōten is particularly prevalent in the Kansai area (especially in Osaka), where it rivals that of the god Ebisu (another deity worshiped for commercial success) in popularity.

Perhaps to curb abuses and superstitious ideas that could stem from the popular image of Shōten as a god who grants each and every wish, various authors such as Hayashiya have stressed the importance of deepening one's devotion beyond simply asking for worldly benefits. Tendai monk Haneda Shukai for instance writes that the god's true gift to his worshipers is non-attachment (naiṣkramya; 出離, shutsuri) to material desires and that faith in Shōten (or any other Buddhist deity) should awaken in the devotee a desire to learn and follow Buddhist teachings.

==== Shōten and impurity ====
Shōten is also considered to abhor impurity (kegare). For instance, ritually impure persons (e.g. those who had recently come in contact with death or menstruating women) are discouraged from visiting him in temples for a set period of time. (Similar taboos exist in Shinto, which also lays great emphasis on purity, but is otherwise rare in Japanese Buddhism, which was closely associated with death and the afterlife due to its having a near-monopoly on funerary practices.) Temples dedicated to Shōten also do not have a cemetery (a common fixture in many Japanese temples) within their precincts, nor do monks who perform Shōten rites conduct funerals. Temples also forbid devotees from placing ofuda of the deity in 'unclean' rooms (e.g. bedrooms or kitchens) or in altars (butsudan) where deceased family members are venerated.

==== As hidden god ====
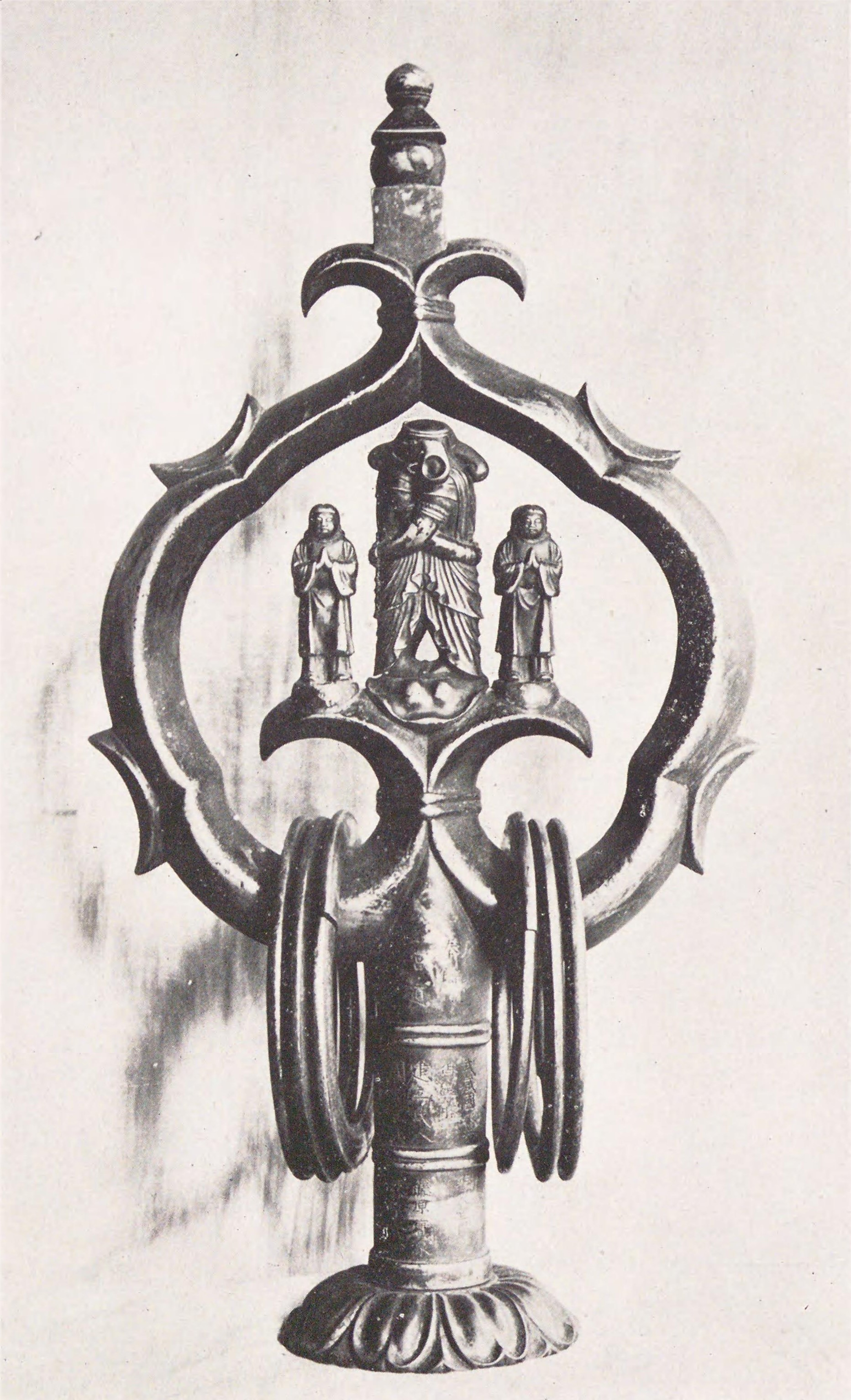
The principal image (honzon) of Kangi-in (Menuma Shōden-zan) in Kumagaya, Saitama Prefecture: the finial of a monastic staff (khakkhara, shakujō) depicting the dual Kangiten and two attendants. The central image of Kangiten is normally wrapped in red cloth and is only uncovered at irregular intervals, the most recent of which was during the temple's 840th anniversary in 2016.

A notable characteristic of Shōten is the air of secrecy surrounding him. Unlike Ganesha, whose image is prominently worshiped in many temples and homes, most images of Shōten are kept hidden inside miniature shrines (厨子, zushi) and are never shown to the public, only being taken out during the performance of rites (which are themselves conducted in private) such as the Oil Bath Ritual. A notable exception to the rule is the honzon of Kangi-in (Menuma Shōden-zan) in Kumagaya, Saitama Prefecture, which is intermittently put on public display (御開帳, go-kaichō) since the Edo period. As they require a high level of maintenance, modern-day lay devotees are discouraged from owning or venerating idols of Shōten in their homes; instead, they are advised to venerate him via consecrated paper or wooden ofuda distributed by temples. Such ofuda are usually aniconic, bearing no visual representation of the god (who may be simply represented by his seed syllable), (Note: Two examples: ofuda issued by Shinjō-in (Yushima Shōden) in Tokyo () and those distributed by Zentsū-ji in Kagawa Prefecture ().) though a few examples contain a depiction of the youthful Kangi Dōji or of Kangiten as an anthropomorphic male-female couple.

Popular belief holds that encountering Shōten (i.e. learning about him or getting an opportunity to venerate him) is only possible if one has a karmic connection (縁, en / enishi) with him, which itself is considered to be a precious and rare blessing. This sentiment is expressed in a liturgical text penned by the monk Kakuban, which states:

"Birth as a human being is hard to attain and yet I have unexpectedly attained it; Shōten's dharma is difficult to encounter and yet I am fortunate to have encountered it. Having arrived at this opportune moment [to worship him], I cannot hold back my tears." (Note: 「適々難受受人界之生、幸難逢逢聖天之法。機縁之至感涙難禁。」)

Shōten is also described in medieval texts as a "placenta god" (胞衣神, enagami or 胞衣荒神, ena kōjin), a deity who guards individuals since the moment of their conception (just as the placenta covers and protects the fetus) and subsequently follows them throughout their life "like a shadow."

=== Lay devotion ===
Some people as part of their devotion may observe vows (願掛け, gankake; cf. the Hindu vrata), in which they would promise to carry out certain pious acts in return for specific favors, or abstain from alcohol, tobacco, or certain types of food. From an orthodox perspective, however, any promises made to Shōten cannot be revoked; such devotional practices are thus not to be performed casually, with some authorities even recommending to avoid them altogether lest one risk committing a grave offense against the god. A set of guidelines for devotees published by Honryū-in (also known as Matsuchiyama Shōden, a sub-temple of Sensō-ji in Asakusa, Tokyo dedicated to Kangiten) for instance advises the reader that "[since] abstinence (断ち物, tachimono) requires a strong resolve, it is better not to practice it."

Opinions differ regarding the place of abstinence in Shōten worship. On the one hand, Hayashiya claimed that "although Shōten does not necessarily reject one's wishes if one does not practice abstinence, it is true that they are granted faster if one does." Haneda, on the other hand, criticized it as well as the taking of extreme vows (especially when made with materialistic goals in mind) as harmful practices that only attract vinayaka demons (in effect making them a kind of Faustian bargain), asserting that they do not represent authentic devotion to Shōten.

== Temples ==
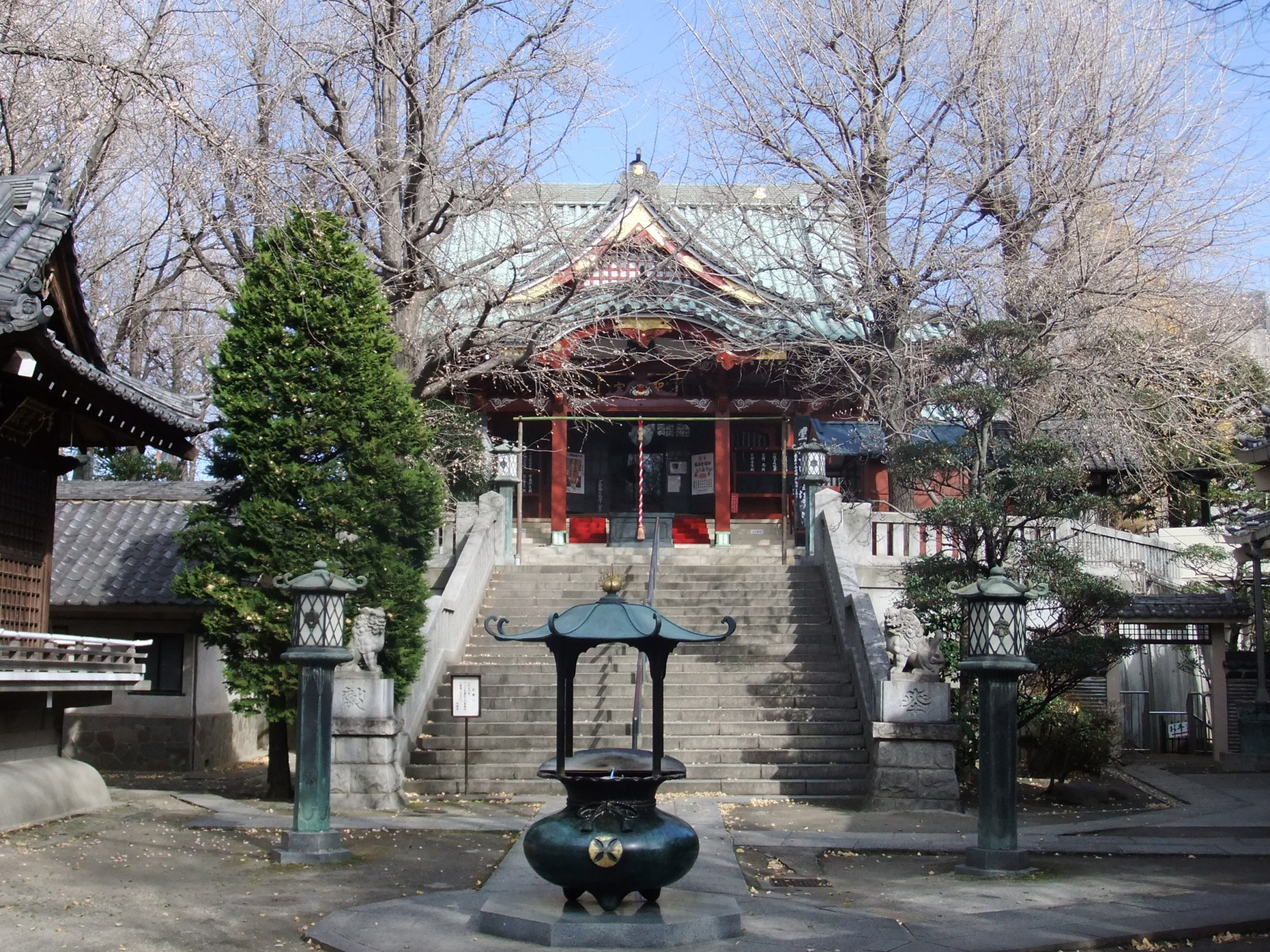
Matsuchiyama Honryū-in (Matsuchiyama Shōden) in Asakusa, Tokyo

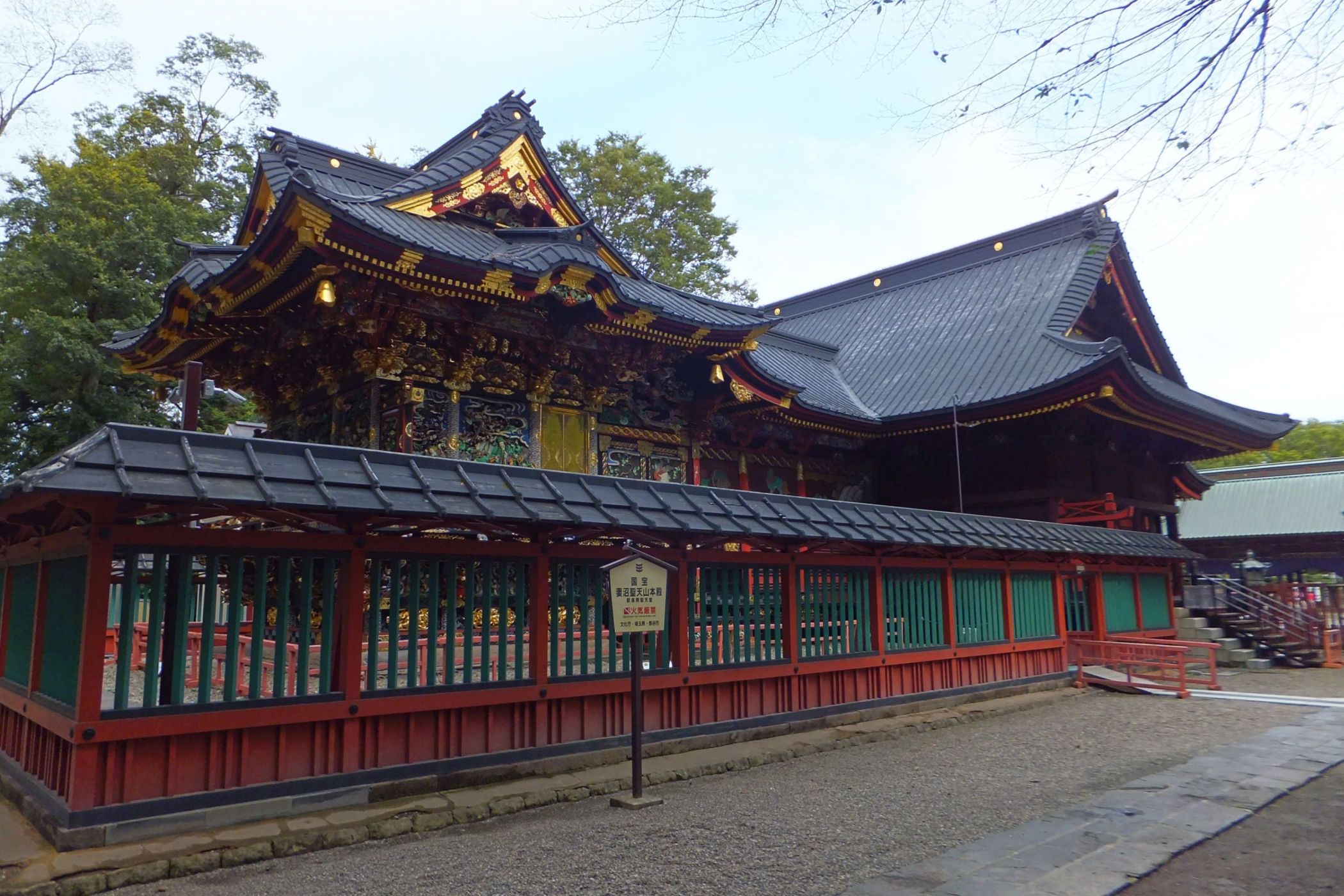
The main hall (honden) of Menuma Kangi-in (Menuma Shōden), as seen from the rear

Shōten is worshiped in many Shingon and Tendai Buddhist temples throughout Japan. The following are two of the most important places of worship dedicated to the deity in Japan, traditionally reckoned as the "Three Greatest Shōten [Temples]" (日本三大聖天, Nihon Sandai Shōten) (Note: This number is purely symbolic; in reality, many temples claim to be one of these three.):

- Honryū-in (本龍院) (Asakusa, Taitō, Tokyo) – Shō-Kannon-shū (offshoot of Tendai)

One of the sub-temples of Sensō-ji, the oldest and most famous Buddhist temple in Tokyo; also known as Matsuchiyama Shōden (待乳山聖天). Legend claims that the hillock the temple stands on miraculously emerged out of the earth in the year 595. The temple itself was supposedly founded six years later (601), after the bodhisattva Avalokiteshvara appeared in the form of Kangiten and put an end to the severe drought that affected the area.

- Hōzan-ji (宝山寺) (Ikoma, Nara Prefecture) – Shingon Risshū

Also known as Ikoma Shōten (生駒聖天), located on the summit of Mount Ikoma in Nara Prefecture. Claimed to have originally been founded as a temple to the deity Achala (Fudō Myōō) by the ascetic En no Gyōja in the year 664, it was reestablished in 1678 by the monk Tankai, who designated Kangiten as the guardian (鎮守, chinju) of the temple complex. While Achala is still officially the temple's main deity (honzon), Hōzan-ji is more famous as a cult center of Shōten, with business people and other worshipers coming to worship him at his sanctuary (聖天堂, Shōten-dō) in the precincts.

Other notable temples to Shōten include:

- Kangi-in (歓喜院) / Menuma Shōden-zan (妻沼聖天山) (Menuma, Kumagaya, Saitama Prefecture) – Kōyasan Shingon-shū

Founded in 1179 by military commander Saitō Sanemori. The temple's honzon – donated to it in 1197 by Sanemori's nephew Miyaji no Kunihira – takes the form of a monastic staff (khakkhara, shakujō) head with an image of the dual Kangiten flanked by two attendants.

- Shinjō-in (心城院) / Yushima Shōden (湯島聖天) (Bunkyō, Tokyo) – Tendai
- Daifukushō-ji (大福生寺) / Ōi Shōten (大井聖天) (Higashi-Ōi, Shinagawa, Tokyo) – Tendai
- Fukushō-in (福生院) / Fukuromachi O-Shōten (袋町お聖天) (Naka-ku, Nagoya, Aichi Prefecture) – Shingon (Chisan-ha)
- Daifukuden-ji (大福田寺) / Kuwana Shōten (桑名聖天) (Higashikata, Kuwana, Mie Prefecture) – Kōyasan Shingon-shū
- Sōrin-in (双林院) / Yamashina Shōten (山科聖天) (Yamashina-ku, Kyoto) – Tendai
- Uhō-in (雨宝院) / Nishijin Shōten-gū (西陣聖天宮) (Kamigyō-ku, Kyoto) – Shingon (Sennyū-ji-ha)
- Ryōtoku-in (了徳院) / Urae Shōten (浦江聖天) (Fukushima-ku, Osaka) – Tō-ji Shingon-shū
- Shōen-ji (正圓寺) (Abeno-ku, Osaka) – Shingon (independent)
- Hōan-ji (法案寺) / Nipponbashi Shōten (日本橋聖天) (Chūō-ku, Osaka) – Kōyasan Shingon-shū
- Saikō-ji (西江寺) (Minoh, Osaka) – Kōyasan Shingon-shū

== See also ==
- Uchchhishta Ganapati
- Acala
- Benzaiten
- Daikokuten
- Ganesha in world religions
- Guanyin
- Modak
- Skanda (Buddhism)
