= Kinchaku =

Traditional Japanese drawstring bag

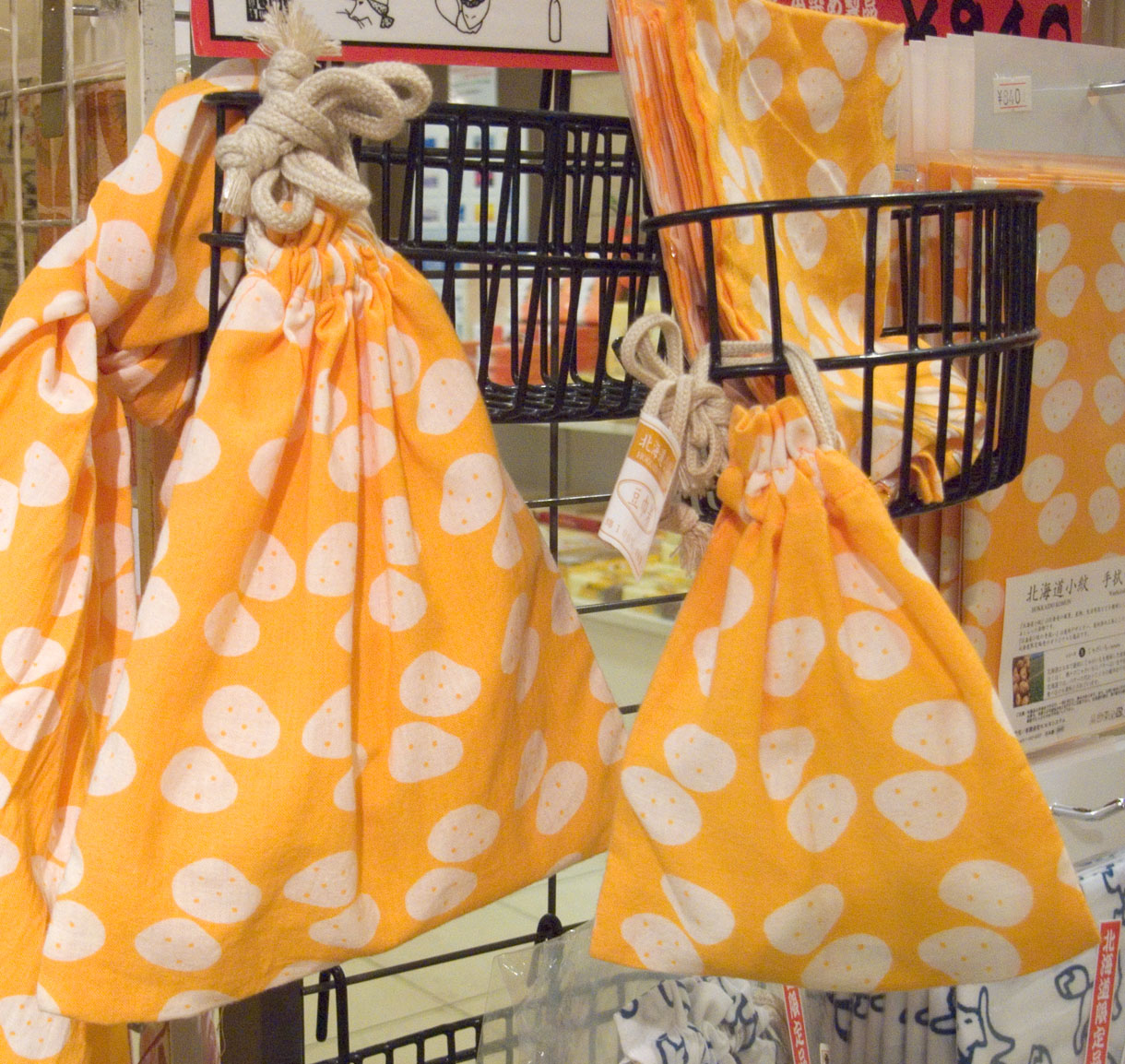
Matching kinchaku bags

Kinchaku (巾着, lit. 'cloth + wearing / on one's person') is a traditional Japanese drawstring bag, used like a handbag (similar to the English reticule) for carrying around personal possessions; smaller ones are usually used as sagemono (a hanging object attached to an obi), and used to carry small objects such as loose coinage, cosmetics, lucky charms, hand warmers and mobile phones. Larger versions can be used to carry bento (packed lunchboxes) and utensils, as well as other larger possessions. The bags traditionally carried by maiko and geisha are a variant on kinchaku, and are called kago (篭) (literally 'basket') after their woven basket base.

== See also ==
- Furoshiki
- Inrō
