= Reticule (handbag) =

Small handbag, originally with a drawstring closure, and often decorated with beadwork

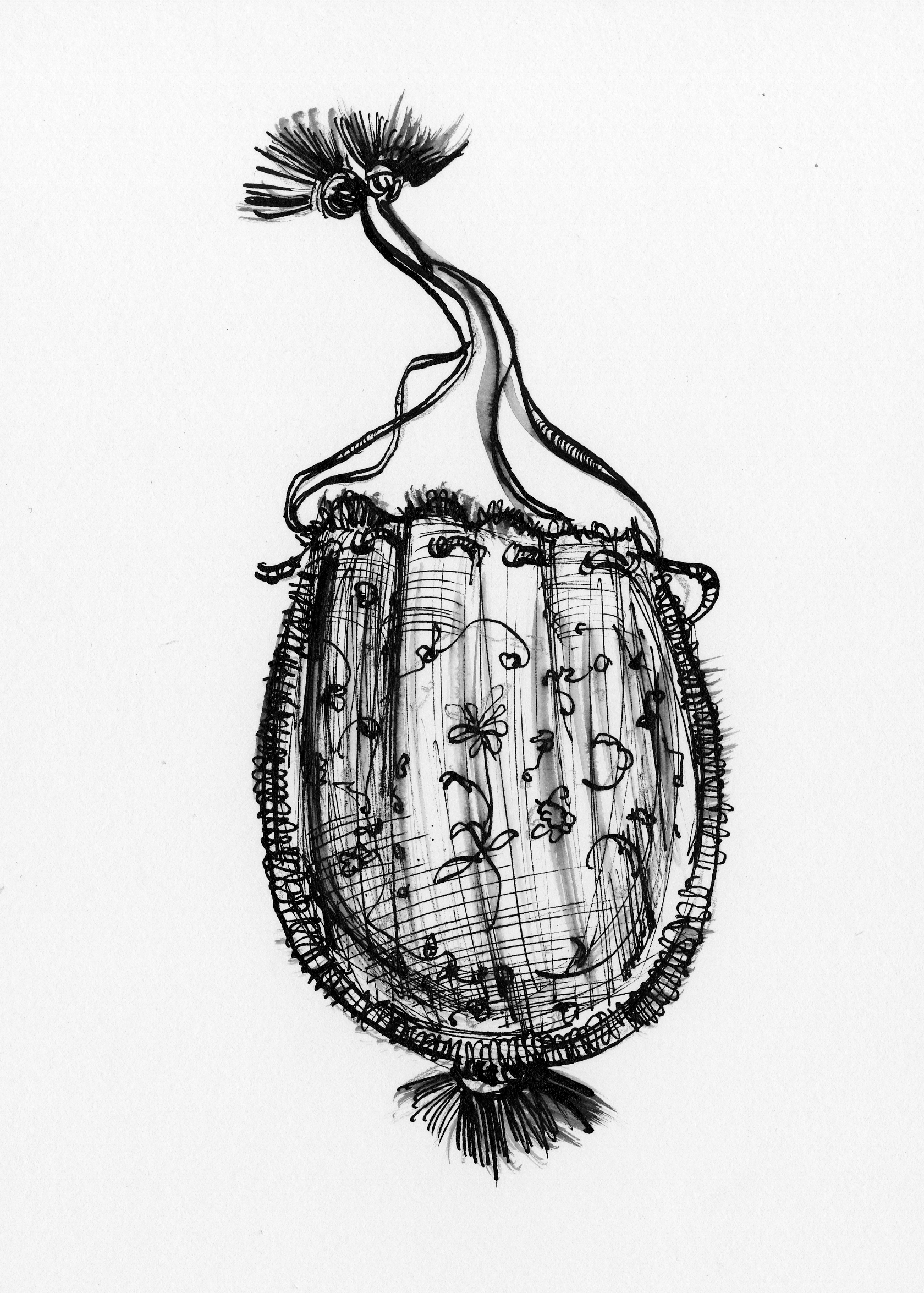
A reticule

A reticule, also known as a ridicule or indispensable, was a type of small handbag or purse, similar to a modern evening bag, used mainly from 1795 to 1820.

The reticule became popular with the advent of Regency fashions in the late 18th century. Previously, women had carried personal belongings in pockets tied around the waist, but the columnar skirts and thin fabrics that had come into style made pockets essentially unusable. When the reticule first appeared, it was made of netting. As time went by, they were made from various fabrics, including velvet, silk, and satin.

A reticule usually had a drawstring closure at the top and was carried over the arm on a cord or chain. Reticules were made in a variety of styles and shapes and sometimes trimmed with embroidery or beading. Women often made their own reticules.

Reticules in museums

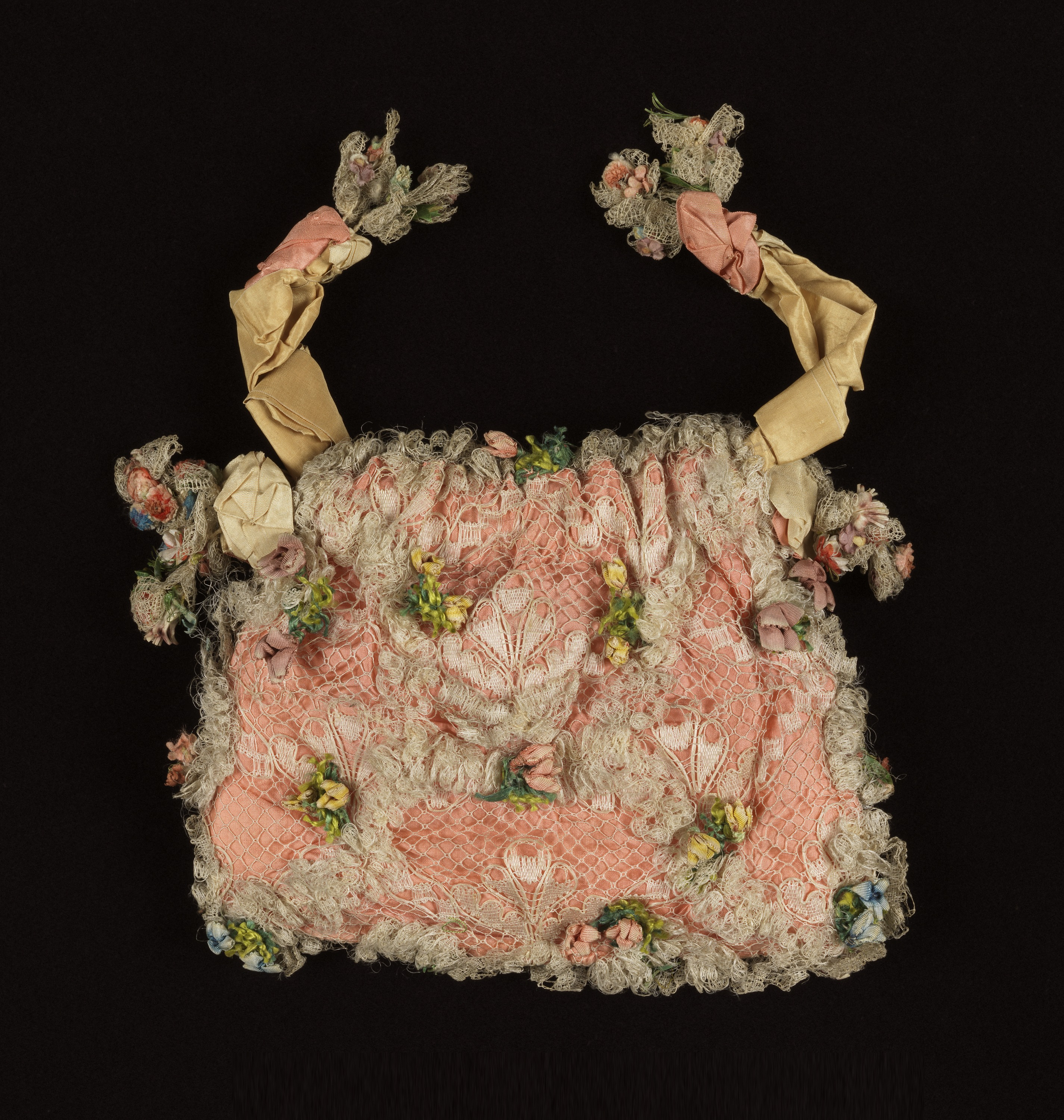
French, late 18th century

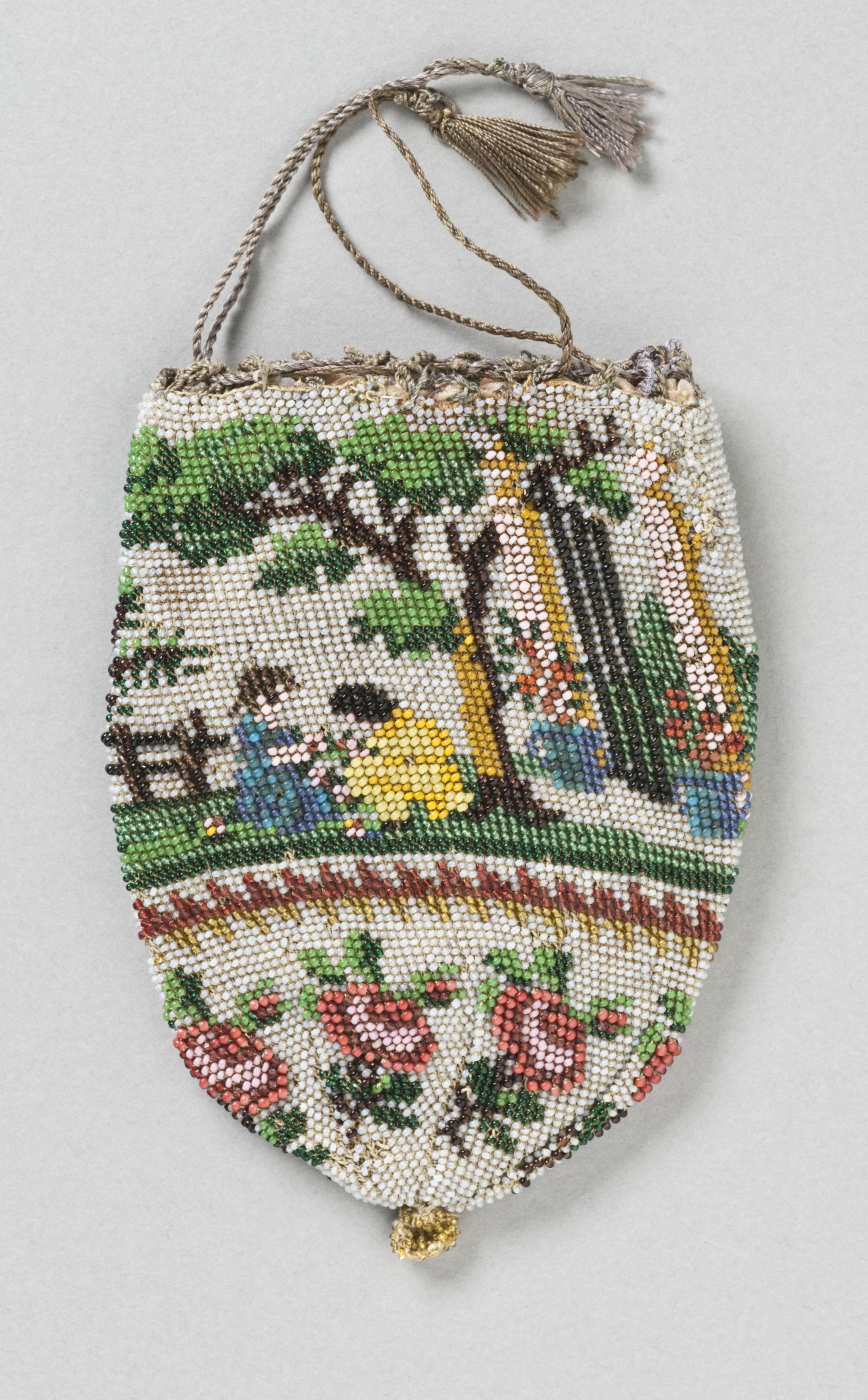
European, c. 1810

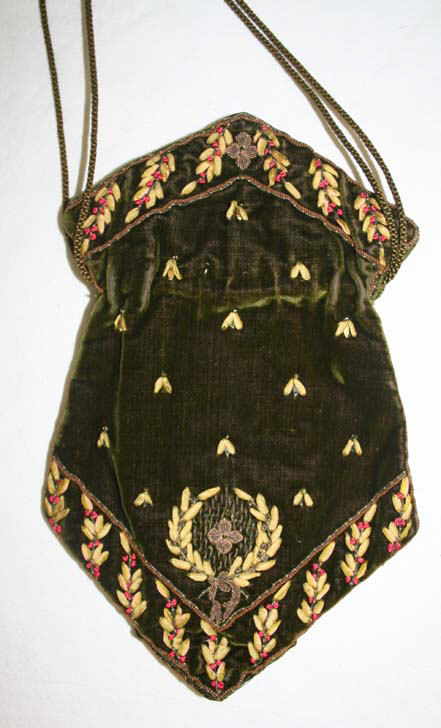
French, early 19th century

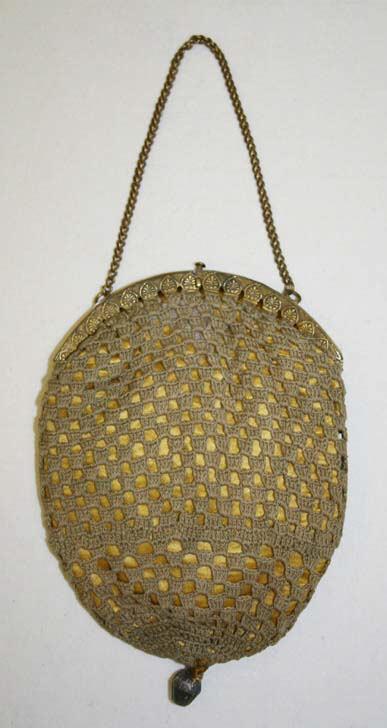
Early 19th century

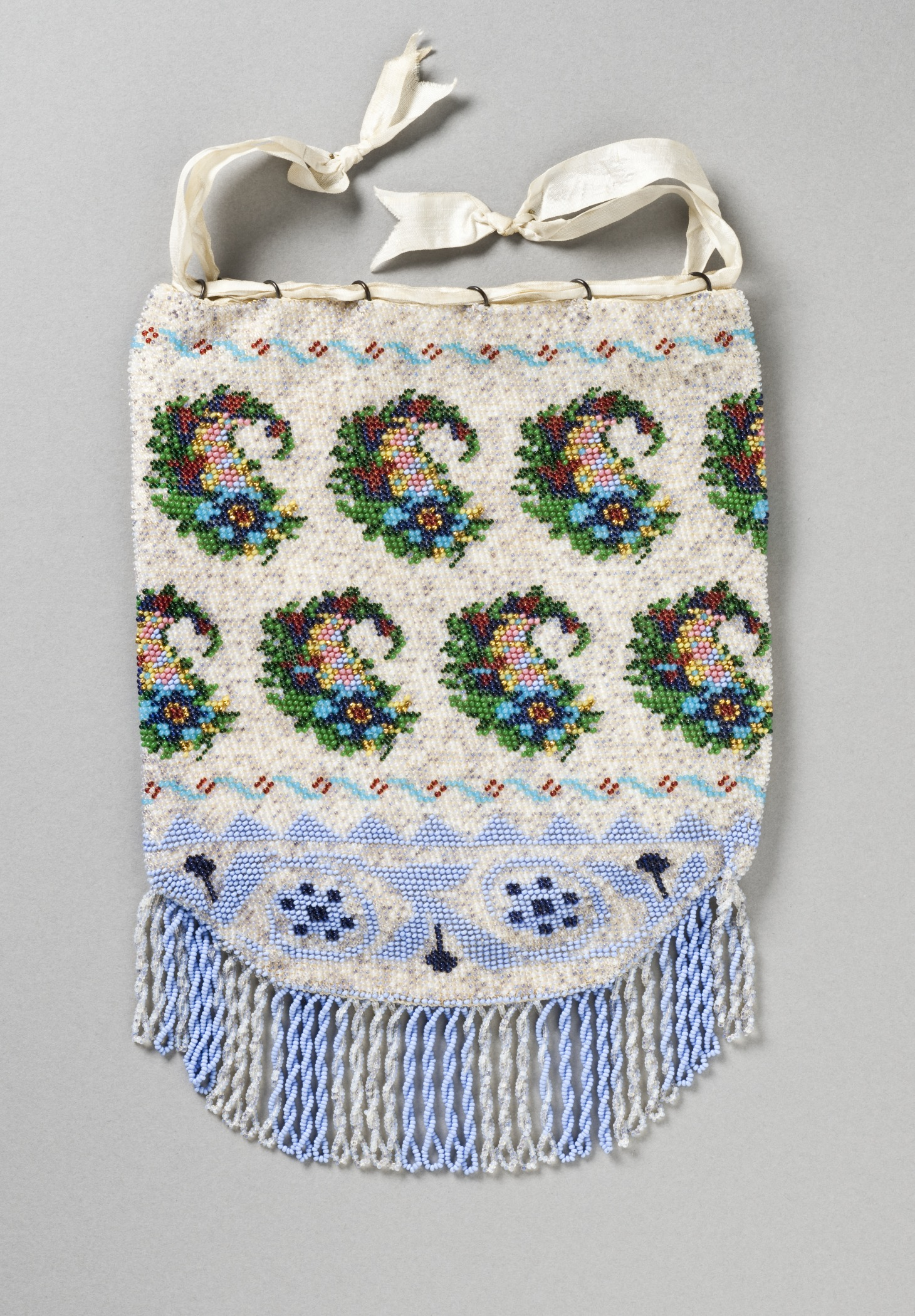
European, c. 1830

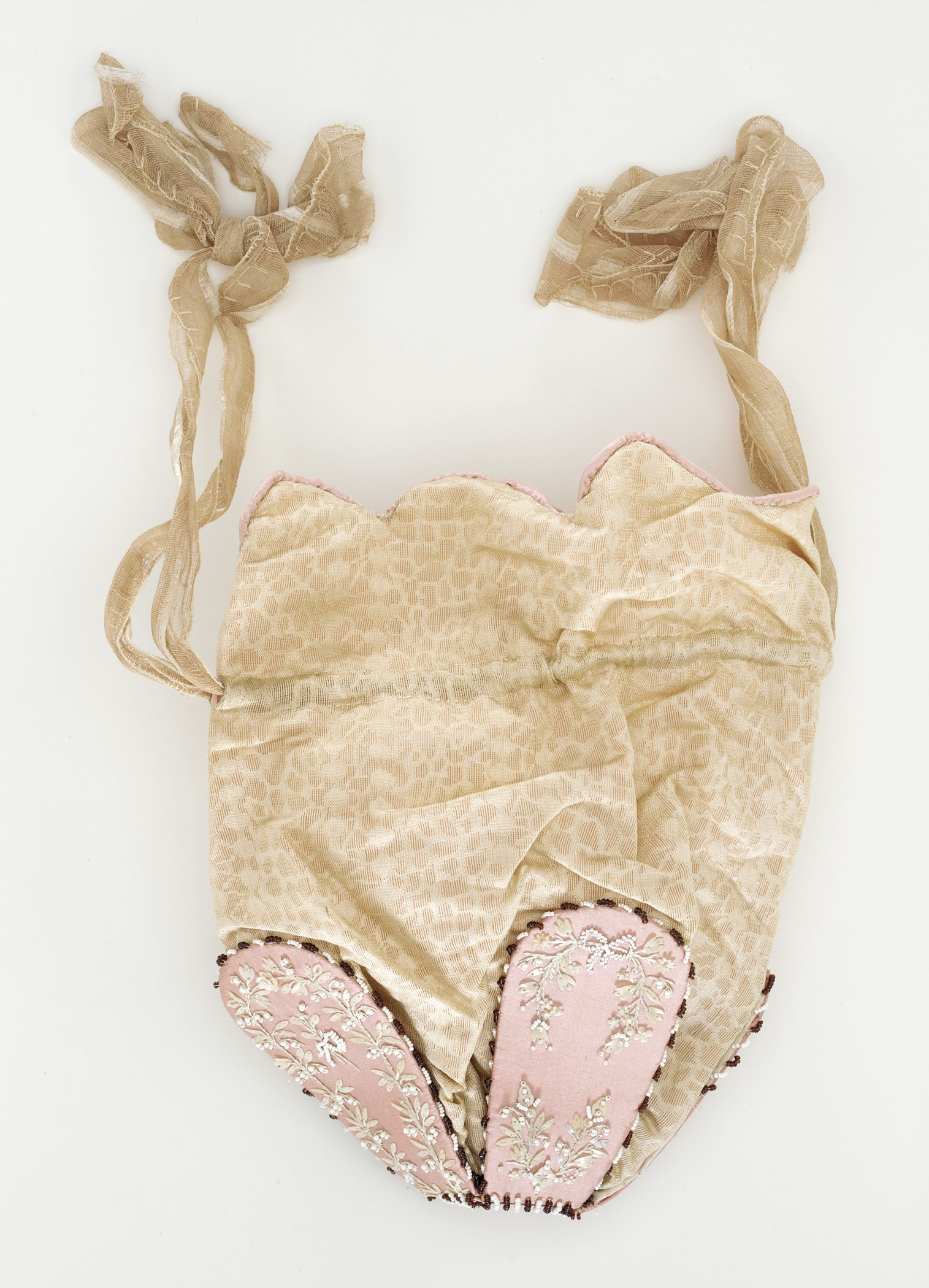
English, 19th century

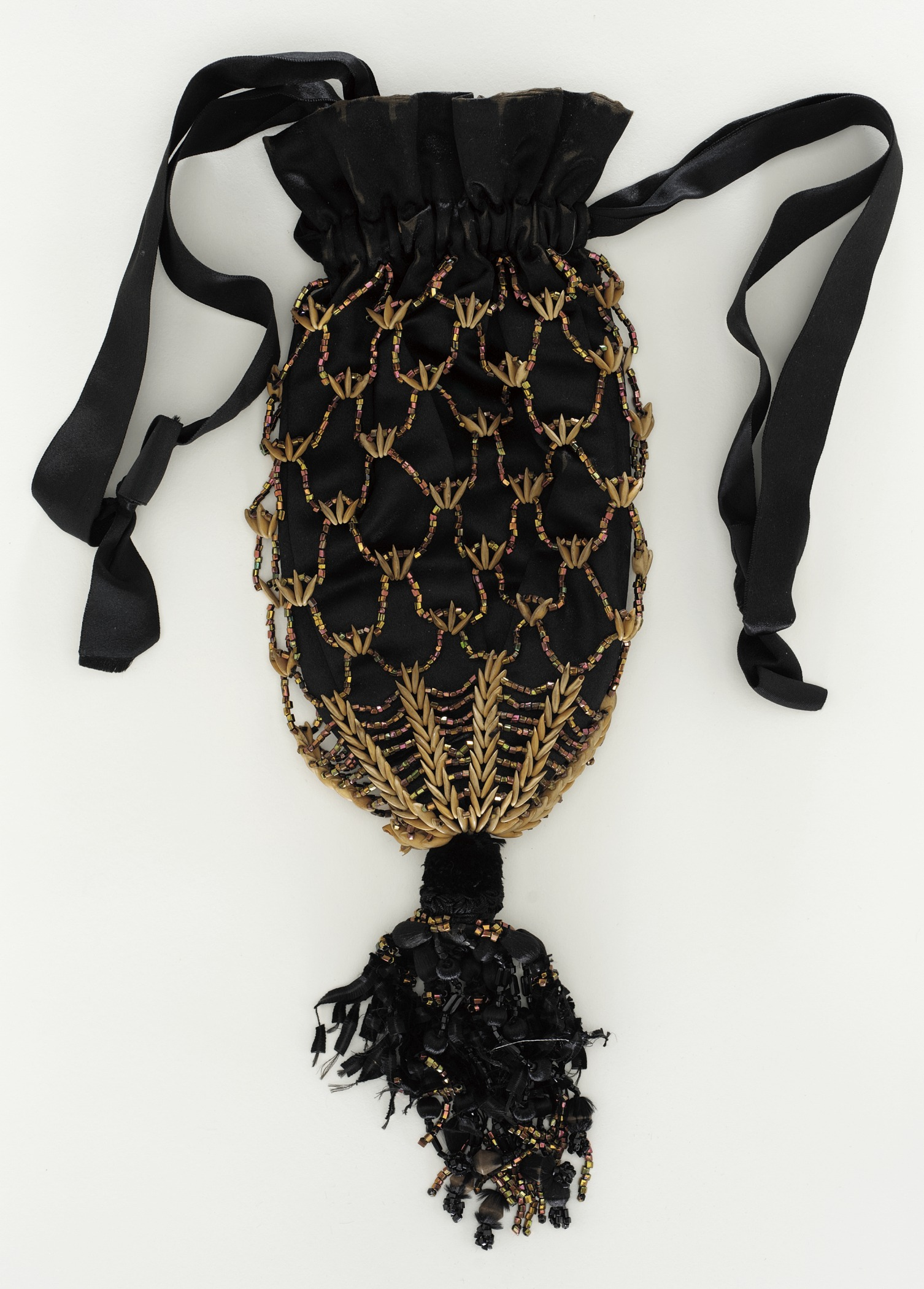
American, c. 1860

== Etymology ==
According to the American Heritage Dictionary, the name "reticule" came from the French réticule, which in turn came from the Latin reticulum, a diminutive of rete, or "net".

== See also ==
- 1795–1820 in Western fashion
