= Happy Seven =

Japanese anime television series

- Cover of the first DVD release

はっぴぃセブン 〜ざ·テレビまんが〜 (Happy 7 ~The TV Manga~)
- Genre: Comedy, Magical girl, Harem
- Light novel
- Written by: Hiroyuki Kawasaki
- Illustrated by: COM
- Published by: Shueisha
- Imprint: Super Dash Bunko
- Original run: 2001 – 2009
- Volumes: 21
- Anime television series
- Directed by: Tsutomu Yabuki
- Produced by: Satoru Akahori, Saburo Omiya
- Written by: Hiroyuki Kawasaki
- Music by: furani
- Studio: Studio Hibari, Trinet Entertainment
- Original network: TV Kanagawa
- Original run: 2 October 2005 – 25 December 2005
- Episodes: 13

Happy Seven (はっぴぃセブン 〜ざ·テレビまんが〜, Happy 7 ~The TV Manga~) is an anime series which consists of 13 episodes that began airing in Japan October 2, 2005. The original story was by Hiroyuki Kawasaki. It was directed by Tsutomu Yabuki and produced by Studio Hibari and Trinet Entertainment.

== Overview ==
The protagonist of the series, Amano Sakogami, is a happy but unlucky girl. She has a dream about being attacked by a woman in a purple kimono. She is rescued by a boy in this dream, who causes her to forget the dream. It is only when she is recruited by a club at her school that she remembers. This club is called the Kaiun Kenkyukai (Better Fortune Research Organization), a cover for the Happy Seven, seven girls who each have a different power of the Shichifukujin, the Seven Lucky Gods. There are two other female members of the club, a dog-girl and a girl with pigtails and glasses. Amano recognizes the lone male member of the club as the boy who rescued her in her dreams. When she realizes this, she appoints herself their manager, hoping that this will allow her to get closer to him. She realizes that the student council president is Happy Seven's adversary, working with the woman in the purple kimono she saw in her dream. He is one of the reasons that Magatsugami, monsters that feed on negative emotions, are being released onto the world. It is the Happy Seven's job to fight them and find people with incredibly bad luck (such as Amano) and help them improve their fortune, through praying for their problems to be solved at a stone in a forest. By praying like this, they rid the person of the Magatsugami feeding on their sadness and therefore causing their misfortune. Normally, the memory of the person with the Magatsugami would be erased so that the identities of the Seven are not revealed, but this does not work for Amano. In episode 10, Amano and her childhood friends Nene and Mimi transform into Lucky Three (three transforming magical girls similar to the Happy Seven) but Mimi and Nene's memories are erased by Kikunosuke.

== Characters ==
=== Better Fortune Research Organization ===
- Amano Sakogami (voiced by Yuuna Inamura): The protagonist of the story who had been possessed by a Magatsugami from the time when she was very young until she met the Better Fortune Research Organization who used their powers to defeat it. The Magatsugami gave her extremely bad luck, causing things to happen to her ranging from tripping and falling down staircases or stepping on and break her brand-new cell phone to having heavy objects fall on her or getting hit by a volleyball in gym class. After the Magatsugami was defeated, Amano's luck became far better but her clumsiness remained. She has a crush on Kikunosuke, but does not know the rule that the other female members of the club have: even though they all like him, they are not allowed to go out with him. After discovering the secret of the club, she asks to join and is unanimously rejected by all of the female members, but when she offers to be the manager Kikunosuke agrees while all of the others were discussing the idea. She is one of the Lucky Three and the leader.
- Kikunosuke Kagawa (voiced by Jun Fukuyama): The only male club member and Amano's upperclassman who she has a crush on. He can transform into one of the Seven, but his god is not readily revealed. When Amano asks for details about the Happy Seven and he is explaining how each member represents a god, he only has the chance to tell her that his role was more complicated than the others. His eyes always appear to be closed except for when he transforms.
- Kuriya Kuroda (voiced by Houko Kuwashima): She represents Daikoku-ten and carries a hammer as a weapon. She seems to be some sort of leader among the Happy Seven.
- Tamon Kitayama (voiced by Chiemi Chiba): Tamon represents Bishamon-ten, and her power is Jarei-mekkyaku raiko sange. She is one of the Happy Seven that undertake a major personality change after the appearance shift, going from shy, and timid to slightly aggressive and sure of her power.
- Sarasugawa Kiku (voiced by Mai Nakahara): Also said as Okiku. She represents Benzai-ten. She is outgoing and cocky about her talents, but she can easily back her boasts up. She constantly calls Amano "Ribbon Girl" and puts on the outside appearance that she doesn't like her.
- Mahiru Oki (voiced by Yu Kobayashi): Mahiru represents Ebisu and tends to carry around a fish with her. Even her weapon when she transforms is something like a fishing pole with a fish on the end. She is the only university student in the club.
- Miku Munakata (voiced by Yuuko Sumitomo): She represents Hotei-sama and is a doctor. She is the eldest member of the club (she works as the school's nurse) and has the power to predict the future when she transforms and appears to have some minor premonitions when not transformed as seen in Episode 9.
- Mina and Nami Kotobuki (voiced by Omi Minami): Mina and Nami are twins and the youngest members of the club, as the only elementary students. They have a tendency to fall over and go to sleep if they expend even the smallest amount of energy, which they seem to lack, except when they transform in which case they are full of energy. Mina represents Fukurokuju and Nami represents Juroujin (twin gods of luck and fortune based on Shou, the god of the South Pole Star in Taoist astrology). Because they represent a binary god, they are almost the same person. Details about the twins' relationship are in episode 6.
- Kuan Kitayama (voiced by Eri Sendai): She is one of the few club members who is not a part of the Happy Seven and is Tamon's younger sister. She is shown as being good with computers and machinery, and helps the Happy Seven by using her computer to get information on Magatsugami and using various gizmos to stun, trap, or otherwise hinder them.
- Shouko Shouda (voiced by Tomoko Kaneda): Also called Shoujou, she has dog ears and can transform into a small dog. She is one of the members who cannot transform, but acts as a sort of familiar for the others. Every time someone refers to her as a dog, she sharply denies being one, which is often disproved by one of the members issuing a command such as "shake" and her automatically complying.

=== Enemies ===
- Kokuanten (Voiced by Kikuko Inoue) : An evil goddess whose power was somehow taken away, her goal is to use the "Red Star" to return herself to full strength, she also has some measure of control over the Magatsugami and "Tainted Ones."
- Tomoya Kuki (Voiced by Kumi Sakuma): He is the student council president at the school and appears henchman of sorts to Kokuanten, but is later revealed to be using her for his own end.
- Magatsugami: Monsters that possess people and cause misfortune, then feeding on their unhappiness. Kokuanten and Tomoya manipulate them so that they can be used against the Happy Seven, whose job it is to defeat them. When they are killed, they turn into good luck charms.

=== Supporting characters ===
- Mimi Masuko (voiced by Nanako Inoue): She is Amano and Nene's childhood friend and a member of Lucky Three representing the Ears, though her memory was erased after she transformed.
- Nene Tokuda (voiced by Erika Nakai): Amano and Mimi's childhood friend and a member of Lucky Three representing the Eyes, though she, like Mimi, had her memory of the incident erased.
- Chazawa: Teacher who isn't married and dreams of it. But eventually marries one of his former students.
- Kaoru Sajime: A student at the school who dressed like a boy because she was possessed by a Magatsugami. The club solved her problem after discovering that her reason for being unhappy was her parents' disapproval of her hobby, which is building models, because it isn't "feminine". After defeating the Magatsugami, her parents saw reason and allowed her to return to the plastic model club, which they had forced her to quit along with her hobby. She is the only girl in that club and the male members have a rule similar to the Better Fortune Research Organization's, which only the male members know about, which is that none of them are allowed to date her.
- Tomomi Sasaki (Saki Fujita): Appeared in episode 10. A friend of Mimi's that had a confusing life and didn't believe in anything.

== Episode list ==
No.	Title	Original release date
1	"Seven Lucky Girls"; Transliteration: "Shichinin no Fukumusume" (Japanese: 七人の福娘)	October 2, 2005
Monsters were attacking Amano and the Happy Seven comes to fight them. Kikunosuke Kagawa saves her and erases her memory. The next morning Amano feels like she was forgetting something. As she looks out the window of her classroom, she sees a boy and remembers that it was the same boy from her dream. Amano falls down the stairs and ends up in Better Fortune Research Organization's room. The girls tell her to go to a stone called the stone of prayer. The stone shone with some sort of light and a monster comes out.
2	"Exorcism Battle"; Transliteration: "Yakubarai taiketsu" (Japanese: 厄ばらい大決戦)	October 9, 2005
The Happy Seven were about to fight with the monster that was associated with Amano's bad luck but the student council president shows up (the ally of the monster)and the monster and the president escape. The Happy Seven decides to do the Diveine Spirit Test on Amano and they found out that she has an ability and it stopped her memory from getting erased. After being attacked and saved again, Amano decides to join the Better Fortune Research Organization as their manager.
3	"Laughter Brings Prosperity"; Transliteration: "Warau kado ni ha fuku kitaru" (Japanese: 笑う門には福来る)	October 16, 2005
After hearing that the Seven have trouble finding people that are possessed, Amano asks her friends to get the word out about the club and how they will help with "Misfortune." This does not go so well however as they discover no one whom is possessed, but help those people with their misfortune anyway. While the senior members of the group are away, Amano's home class teacher asks for help with his love life, and is revealed to be possessed. After not being able to remove the monster from praying at the prayer stone, due to his lack of belief, the group head to his home, and attempt to make him as happy as possible. After revealing that he wasn't unhappy about not having a wife due to all the children he had helped grow, he is truly happy, and the monster that made one unlucky in love is forced out, and easily defeated. The teacher awakens soon after, before Miku arrives with the woman she had been trying to help. The woman dashes inside and asks the teacher to marry him. The episode ends on the couple's wedding photo.
4	"The Excitement of Guys, Girls & Plastic Models"; Transliteration: "Otoko doki onna doki PURAMO doki" (Japanese: 男どき女どきプラモどき)	October 23, 2005
Amano finds out that Kagawa-kun had to go a meeting and wasn't at the club. The other members tell her that everyone in the club has a crush on him and show her the rules on that matter; randomly Kagawa-kun walks in and they all panicked. Kaoru-kun was a girl but acted and dressed like a boy since she was possessed. The Happy Seven tried to make her more girly. After failing, they went to the plastic model club that she was in and they found out that she was a normal girl before she quit. They got Kaoru to make a model and the monster came out of her. Happy Seven defeated the monster and Kaoru went back to normal.
5	"Where There's Hardship, There's Good Fortune"; Transliteration: "Nigai areba fuku ari" (Japanese: 苦あれば福あり)	October 30, 2005
A young boy went missing. At the festival, Amano accidentally got Kagawa's Yukata dirty and a lady told her not to wipe it. She brought them to her house and served them tea, explaining that her husband had run off with a younger woman, and after a strange moment with Amano the Happy Seven believe her to be possessed. While discussing tactics, Shouju hears a noise that sounded as if it was a young boy, following it they find the missing boy in her shed, wrapped in a web. While they are attempting to free the boy, they are captured by webs themselves; coming from the lady. After talking her down, the monster is freed and defeated.
6	"The Third Twin"; Transliteration: "Sanninme no futag" (Japanese: 三人目の双子)	November 6, 2005
Tamon bought hair clips for everyone.The twins did not want one since the shapes were different. Before long a monster appears, called "The Mirror", the twins transform and attempt to attack it, but the monster changes form into Mina confusing Nami as she was forced to pick who was the real one, but she is attacked before she can. Once home, the twins have a fight, Nami realising that her and Mina had become too much alike after a chat with Kikunosuke. Upon returning home both twins declared themselves their own person, and put on the hair clips before heading out to fight again as some of the Happy Seven had been lured out and captured. Once seeing the twins, the monster proceeds to use the same tacit once more, however, Mina lets her hair fall out, the same side as the one she had the clip on. Tricking the monster, it is quickly defeated and the Happy Seven are freed.
7	"After Disaster Comes Awakening"; Transliteration: "Kazawai koshite dai kakusei" (Japanese: 禍転じて大覚醒)	November 13, 2005
After viewing Kikunosuke through her magic skull, Kokuanten develops a crush upon him and a desire to see what is so appealing about school life, and decides to investigate. While there, she causes a few minor disasters before meeting Amano, who gives her a talisman to use for love, which she fights with herself about using. After she eventually gives in, the required spell is interrupted by a volleyball that Amano hit too hard. After running upstairs to apologize, Kokuanten reveals herself to Amano and a fight between her and the Happy Seven begins. During the fighting, Amano comes to the realisation that Kokuanten liked Kikunosuke, and before he could deliver the final blow, she placed herself in between them, her mysterious powers somehow blocking the blow, allowing Tomoya to "rescue" Kokuanten.
8	"Rival Clubs' Song Battle"; Transliteration: "Bukatsu taikou utagassen" (Japanese: 部活対抗歌合戦)	November 20, 2005
Amano accidentally places her name on an entry form for the Club Singing contest, making Okiku furious, before the rest of the group convince her to train Amano. It is quickly revealed that Amano is tone deaf and a week long training sessions begin. The day before the contest Kikunosuke asks her to sing to him, and it sounds amazing... however the next day she is back to being tone deaf. Okiku attempts to take Amano's place but the fight causes the set to collapse forcing the contest to be postponed. Allowing Okiku to realise the reason behind Amano's lack of tone. As the Happy Seven cheer Amano on and Kikusnosuke watches from backstage Amano sings beautifully, Okiku revealing that she has talent, but can only sing well to the one she loves.
9	"Art Brings Luck"; Transliteration: "Kei ha fuku wo sazukeru" (Japanese: 芸は福をさずける)	November 27, 2005
After falling down the stairs Miku treats her cuts and bruises, before telling her to visit the hospital just in case. While there she meets a boy whom was trying to perform magic, wanting to help him after she discovers he has been ill all his life the Seven help him put on a magic show, before a Magatsugami is revealed in the boys doctor. During the battle the monster tells him that if he let him possess his body, he could make him well. Desperate he agrees, once possessed, he commands him to "make sure Amano never smiles again." Unable to hurt her Amano embraces him in a hug, removing the monster, which after it is quickly defeated. Amano promises to come back every day to visit and that once he is better she will help him do magic for the school. The next day the Seven reveal to Amano that they must wipe his memories, before Miku can tell them to stop, Amano runs from the room and heads to the hospital. Once not finding the boy in his room, she finds out that he died that morning. Miku telling the Seven she had felt that he would be dying soon. Once running once more, Amano discovers the boy's mother, who tells her that the day they had spent together was the happiest he had ever been.
10	"The Rule Breaking Lucky Three!"; Transliteration: "Oteki yaburi LUCKY THREE!" (Japanese: 掟破りのらっきぃスリィ!)	December 4, 2005
Amano's friends are reporting the club, as part of a ruse put on by Tomoya to discover more about the club, while at the same time the club is following a girl whom they believed to be possessed; however, Kokuanten, now recovered from the last battle, find her first, creating a plan. The girl eventually makes her way to the club, and tells them that she no longer believes in anything anymore. They take her to the prayer stone, but she is unable to believe it will work. Amano prays with her, and beings to glow, freeing the girl from the monster. The monster attempts to attack the group before any of them are able to transform, while Amano's friends, whom had been left behind, discover the group and are about to hit by a blast from the monster, while Amano attempts to push them away, all three getting hit. Before they land a large light shines from Amano, causing the three to transform into the "Lucky Three", leaving the Seven, whom were yet to transform dumbfounded. The three quickly destroy the monster, before changing back. Amano's friends then pass her the notebook they had been writing, with information all about Kikusnosuke, hoping it can help her win up the courage to tell him her feelings. Thereafter Kikusnosuke wipes their memories; while Tomoya gets the information he wanted.
11	"The 'We Love You' of the Space Where Demons Cannot Be"; Transliteration: "Oni no inu ma no WE LOVE YOU" (Japanese: 鬼の居ぬ間のウイ·ラブ·ユー)	December 11, 2005
After catching a cold, Amano is unable to go to school, causing the Seven to go gaga over Kikusnosuke, each of them becoming close to the "Virgin Vow of Chastity" they had made. While Amano was ill they decided to hold a contest for a date with him, Kuriya and Tamon winning. After shopping and a picnic Kikusnosuke suggests they to go "Happy Land" a theme park in the town over. Amano's friends, while leaving, see the three arriving and call her, causing Amano to speed off to the park. After Kikusnosuke falls asleep Kuriya and Tamon kiss him on the cheek, just in time for Amano to see, and she yells out, while mysterious red lightning strikes appear from her. Before the girls can explain Kikusnosuke wakes and a Magatsugam. Kikusnosuke apologies and says he had wanted to come to the park as he had known there was a monster here but hadn't wanted to involve any one else from the Seven. The reason is quickly revealed as Amano is struck, causing her to go into a "love daze" and she attempts to kiss Kuriya. The Magatsugam is enjoying the scene he caused, but forgets about Kikusnosuke, and is destroyed. Amano is soon back at school and forgives Kuriya and Tamon, telling herself that they must have been under the influence of the Magatsugam too, the girls agree, to frightened to tell her otherwise.
12	"The Star of Bewitching Souls"; Transliteration: "Ayashiki rei no hoshi" (Japanese: 妖しき霊の星)	December 18, 2005
Worried about Kokuanten's now large interest in humans, Tomoya declares it time to begin their plan. While Kikusnosuke tells the Seven that he is close to discovering what the "Red Star" is, and how they can prevent Kokuanten and Tomoya from attaining it. Awhile later; Amano sits in her room, sulking after getting her grades, wishing that Kikusnosuke would call, before her phone rings, and she smiles as it was just the person she wanted to talk to. After telling her he had something important to tell her she heads out to the meeting place, but he's not there. Tomoya appears, and reveals that it was he that called her, but he did have something important to tell her. He reveals that the Seven each had a crush on Kikusnosuke and had never told her, at first she doesn't believe him until he reveals their "Virgin Vow of Chastity", causing Amano great distress, revealing her to be the key to the Red Star. At the same time Kikusnosuke reveals that he has discovered about Amano being the key, completely unaware of her being used by Tomoya due to the word Kokuanten was casting, but Amano's power was too great, breaking the ward and revealing the monsters to the seven. They reach Amano by the time she had begun the process of removing the red star from under the school, but the power she needed was too much for her body, and as the Red Star lifted from the ground, she fell into Kikusnosuke's arms. Weak, she apologized to the Seven for not knowing their feelings and being so outright with them about hers, she then attempts to tell Kikusnosuke her feels, but dies in his arms.
13	"All's Well That Ends Well"; Transliteration: "Owari yokereba subete yoshi" (Japanese: 終わりよければすべて良し)	December 25, 2005
Kokuanten, seeing the Red Star, quickly flies to its location and absorbs some of its power, making her whole again. Before she can fight with the Seven however, a control panel in the shape of a flower appears, and pulls Amano to it, contesting her somehow, upon seeing Amano Kokuanten has a mixture of feelings. Suddenly Amano's eyes open, and she begins to explain the Red Star's purpose, and that it could wipe out a whole galaxy and that the aliens that had created it were coming to dismantle it, but wouldn't arrive in time before it fired, giving the Seven seven minutes to remove Amano from it, agreeing that if they did so, Amano would still be alive and survive. Unable to do it with their own powers, Shouju tells everyone to give Kikusnosuke their powers, and quickly does so, turning back into a dog before passing out. But Kikusnosuke tells them no, saying it wouldn't work unless they had "her" power, and looks at Kokuanten. Kokuanten fights with her emotions, her hate being spurred on by Tomoya whom wanted everything to end after his brother died. She eventually gives in and while the Seven give Kikusnosuke their power, Kokuanten does also, giving him enough power to destroy the control panel and free Amano, stopping the Red Star from firing. The aliens arrive soon later and thank them. After being teleported to safety, Amano wakes, and apologizes once more. It then cuts to a few months later, and Amano explains that everything was back to normal.

== Theme songs ==
Opening Theme
"Akiramenaide" by Little Non
Ending Theme
"Funny Girl" by Yuka (Except 9)
"Tomaranai Ame" by Little Non (Episode 9)
