= Happy 7 =

Happy 7 may refer to:

- Happy Seven, anime series
- Happy 7, Hello! Project shuffle units
