= Ebisu (mythology) =

Japanese water deity

- Kami associated with water, fisheries, business, wealth
- Member of Seven Gods of Fortune
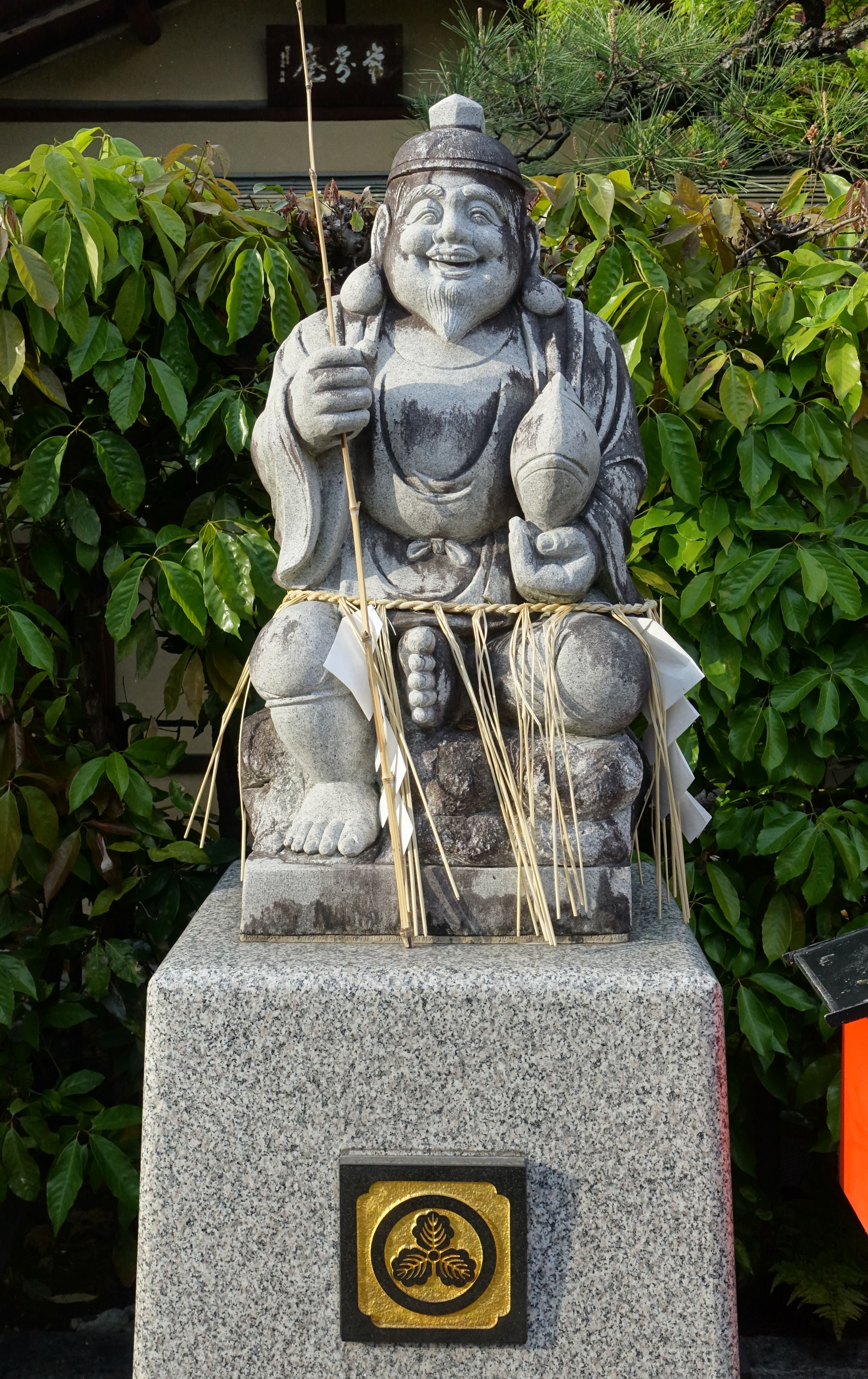
- Statue of Ebisu at Ebisu-jinja in Kyoto
- Other names: Hiruko
- Animals: Fish "Ebisu Dai"
- Gender: Male
- Region: Mainly Kansai
- Ethnic group: Japanese
- Parents: Izanagi and Izanami

Ebisu (えびす・恵比須・恵比寿・夷・戎; Japanese pronunciation: [è̞.bʲí.sɨ́] (Note: The name of the god Ebisu is only pronounced like this. The name of the Ebisu nation and placenames are pronounced [é̞.bʲì.sɨ̀] instead.)), also transliterated Webisu (ゑびす; see historical kana orthography) or called Hiruko (蛭子) or Kotoshiro-nushi-no-kami (事代主神), is the Japanese god of fishermen and luck. He is one of the Seven Gods of Fortune (七福神, Shichifukujin), and the only one of the seven to originate purely from Japan without any Buddhist or Taoist influence. He is a god of wealth and prosperity. He is a patron of tradesmen and fishermen.

== Origins as Hiruko ==
In Feudal times, Ebisu's origin came to be tied together with that of Hiruko, the first child of Izanagi and Izanami, born without bones (or, in some stories, without arms and legs) due to his mother's transgression during the marriage ritual. Hiruko struggled to survive but, as he could not stand, he was cast into the sea in a boat of reeds before his third birthday. The story tells that Hiruko eventually washed ashore—possibly in Ezo (蝦夷; ancient Hokkaidō)—and was cared for by the Ainu Ebisu Saburo (戎三郎). It is however believed that Ebisu first arose as a god among fishermen and that his origin as Hiruko was a much later conception; after the worship of him had spread to merchants and farmers. It is also theorized that he was originally a god known as "Kotoshironushi no Mikoto", son of Ōkuninushi. He became one of the shichifukujin or the seven gods of fortune, which include Daikokuten, Bishamonten, Benzaiten, Fukurokuju, Jurojin, and Hotei. Ebisu, together with Daikokuten, was considered the most popular of these seven and was venerated in almost every Japanese home.

For some communities, in addition for being a deity of fishing, wealth, and fortune, Ebisu is also associated with objects that would drift ashore from the sea such as logs and even corpses. As part of the shichifukujin, Ebisu has three sets of temples and shrines in Tokyo, the Mukojima, Yamate (Bluff), and Meguro sets.

== Legend ==
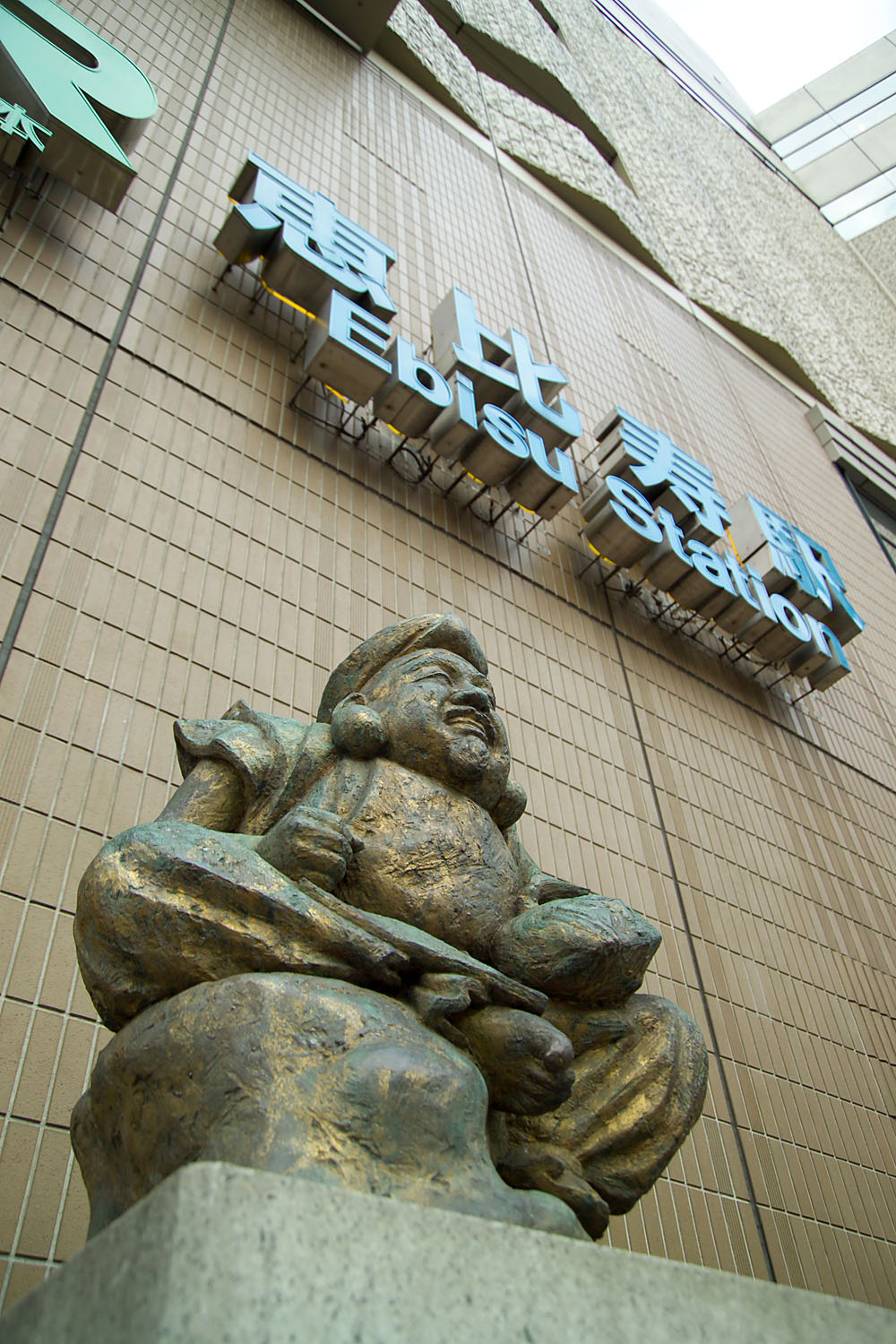
Statue of Ebisu in front of Ebisu Station, Tokyo

The weak child overcame many hardships, grew legs (and, presumably, the rest of his skeletal structure) at the age of three, and became the god Ebisu. He remains slightly crippled and deaf, but mirthful and auspicious nonetheless (hence the title, "The laughing god"). He is often -depicted wearing a tall hat—the Kazaori Eboshi (風折烏帽子)—holding a rod and a large red sea bream or sea bass. Jellyfish are also associated with the god and the fugu restaurants of Japan will often incorporate Ebisu in their motif.

In fishing communities across Japan it is extremely common to see fishermen ritualistically praying to Ebisu before they head out for the day. The fishermen’s relationship with Ebisu is indicative of Japan’s relationship with nature as a whole. Fishermen tell stories of how Ebisu keeps the ocean safe and pristine, pushing debris to the shore. As Ebisu is said to have no arms or legs, fishermen often suggest it takes 7 years for things like screws, bolts, or umeboshi seeds to turn up on shore as Ebisu carries the seed in his mouth and crawls his way along the ocean floor. For this reason, it is believed that Ebisu becomes enraged whenever people pollute the ocean.

== Cultural relevance ==
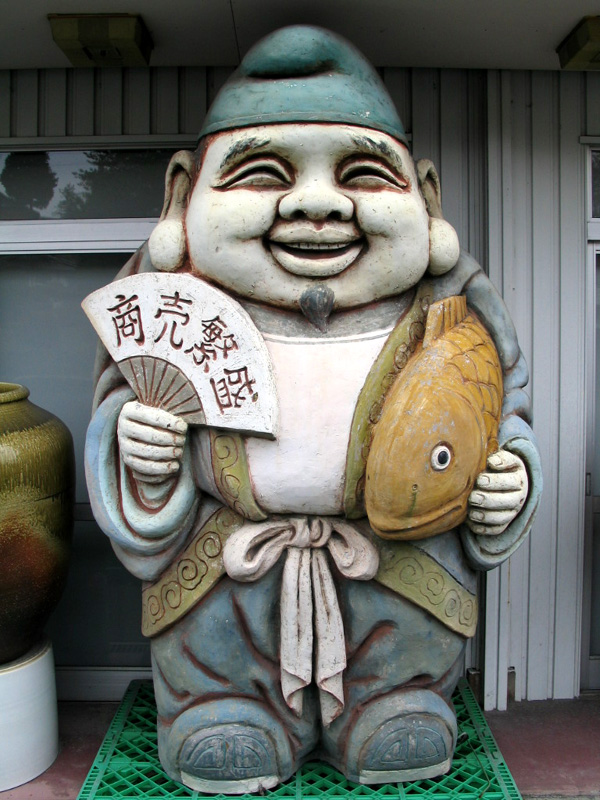
Statue of Ebisu, Tsu, Mie

Ebisu's festival is celebrated on the twentieth day of the tenth month, Kannazuki (the month without gods). While the other myriad members of the Japanese pantheon gather at The Grand Shrine of Izumo, Ebisu does not hear the summons and is thus still available for worship.

Ebisu is frequently paired with Daikokuten, another of the seven gods of Fortune, in displays of the twin patrons by small shopkeepers. In some versions of the myth they are father and son (or master and apprentice). Also, these two are often joined by Fukurokuju as the "Three Gods of Good Fortune".

As a form of animal worshipping, Ebisu was often associated with marine megafauna such as whales and whale sharks (hence the latter being called the "Ebisu-Shark") that bring in masses of fish and protect fishermen. In areas of Northeast Japan, Japanese fishermen opposed whaling, as they believed whales were an incarnation of Ebisu.

Ebisu is depicted or parodied in a wide range of media, from artwork to costumed impersonations at local festivals and in commercial logos and advertisements. One of the most widely recognized product logos is in association with Yebisu beer, which was first brewed in 1890, and was acquired by Sapporo Brewery.

Ebisu is the basis of the name of the clothing brand Evisu.

The B.League professional basketball team Osaka Evessa is named after the local pronunciation of Ebisu-sama (as Ebessan), reflecting the god’s longstanding importance in the city of Osaka. Team mascot Maido-kun is a stylized, childlike depiction of Ebisu wearing a basketball uniform.
