= Old Man of the South Pole =

Taoist deification of Canopus

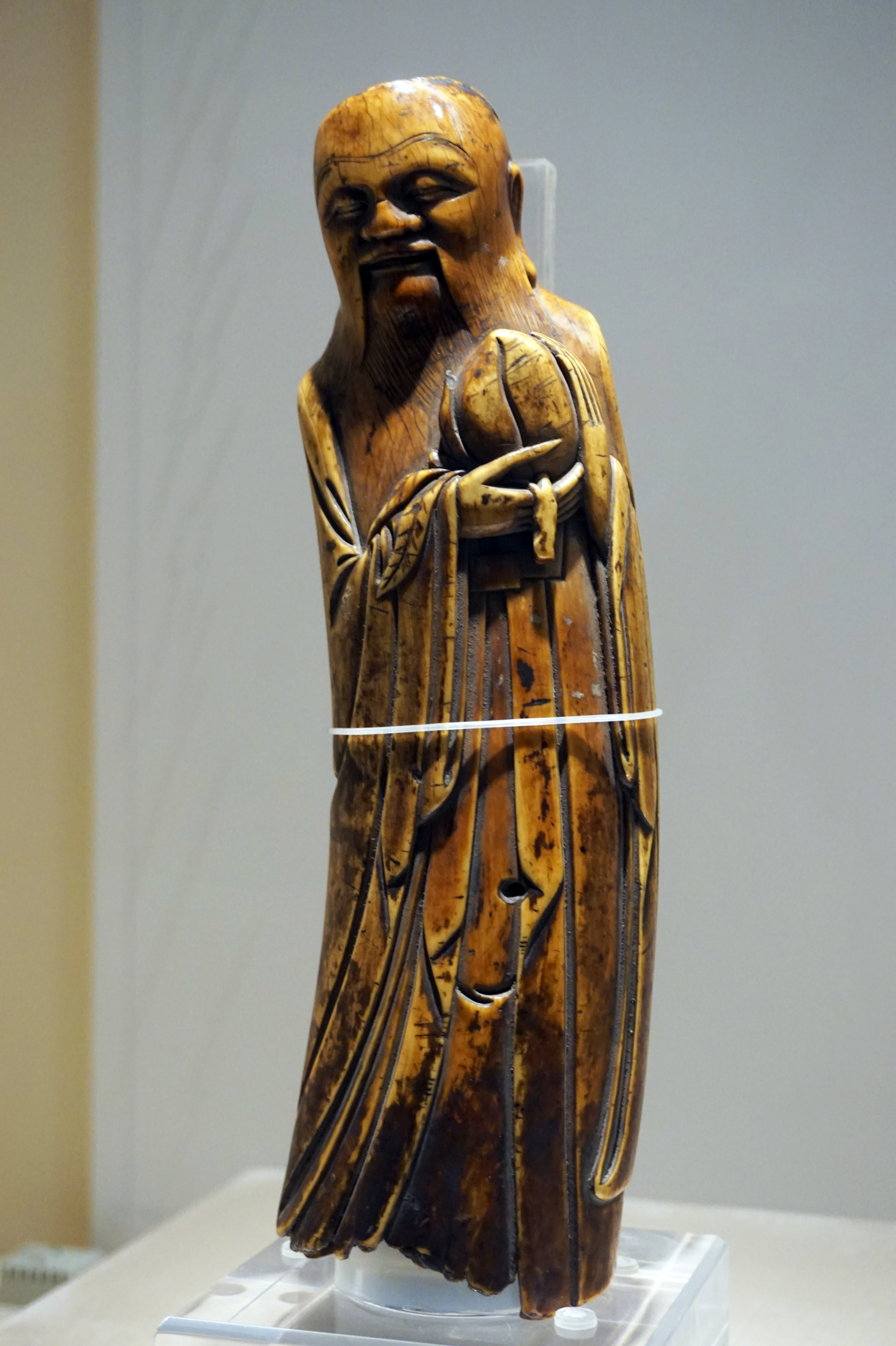
- An ivory carving of Shou Xing from the Ming period
- Traditional Chinese: 南極老人
- Simplified Chinese: 南极老人
- Literal meaning: Old Man of the South Pole
Transcriptions
Standard Mandarin
- Hanyu Pinyin: nánjí lǎorén

The Old Man of the South Pole (Chinese & Japanese: 南極老人), also called the Old Immortal of the South Pole (Chinese: 南極仙翁; pinyin: nánjí xiānwēng), Xian of Longevity (Chinese: 壽仙; pinyin: shòuxiān), or Star of Longevity (壽星; shòuxīng), is the Taoist deification of Canopus, the brightest star of the constellation Carina. He is typically portrayed with long white hair and beard, a protruding forehead and a healthy pink complexion. His right hand often holds a peach and left hand a walking staff with a calabash gourd, which is said to contain the elixir of life. He can also be portrayed as riding a crane or a deer, often accompanied by disciples.

He is one of the symbols of happiness and longevity in Far Eastern culture.

== Description ==
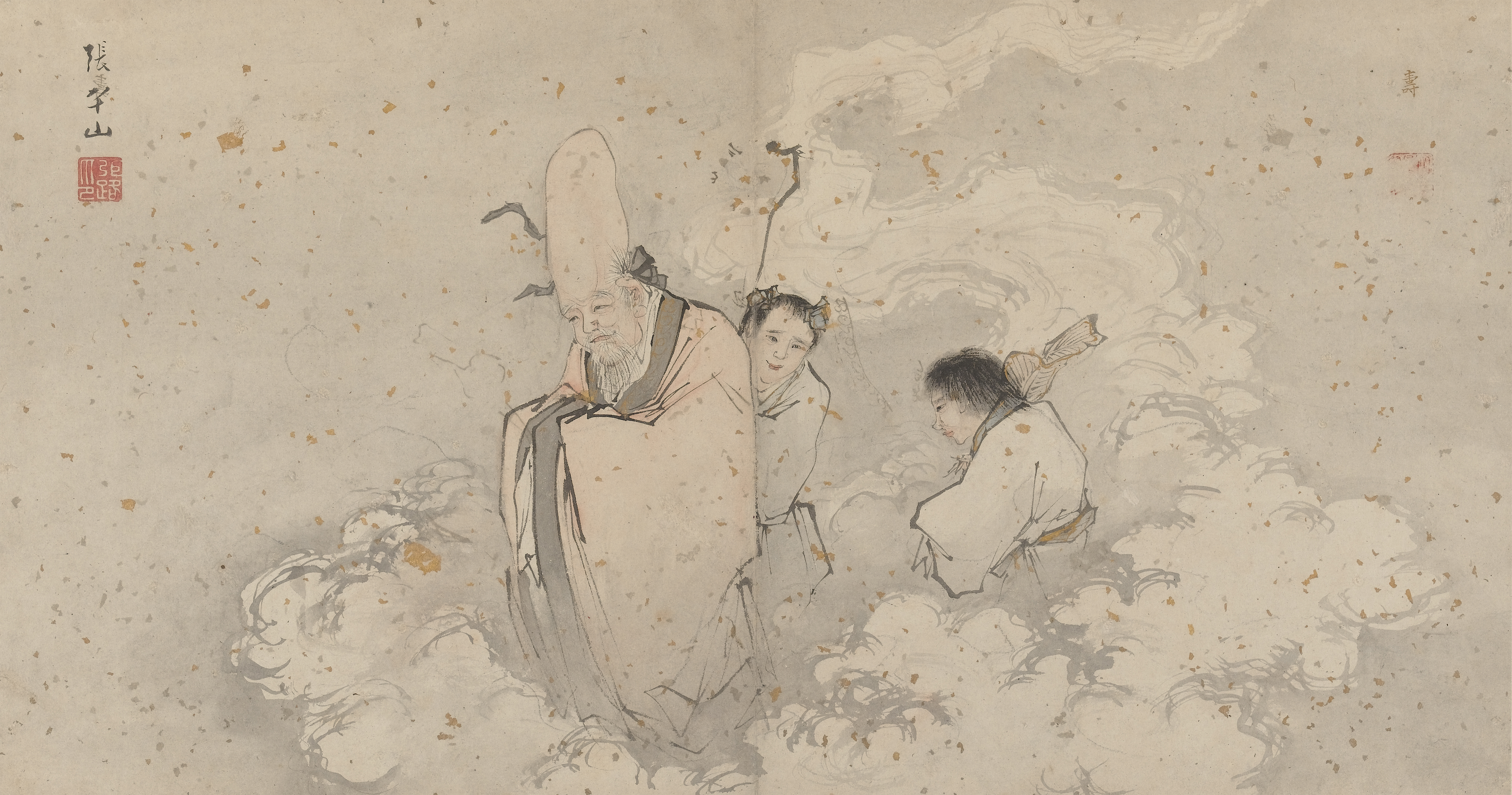
Shoulao (壽老), painting by Zhang Lu (1464–1538)

The Old Man of the South Pole is often depicted in Chinese pictures as an old man with a long white beard with a deer by his side. This style of picture is related to the story of an emperor of the Northern Song dynasty, who had invited such an old man from the street and later considered the old man as the sign of his longevity. In certain Chinese salvationist religions such as Yiguandao, he is responsible for the initiation of the Tao to the beings from the Deva realm.

In Chinese, the star Canopus is usually called the Star of the Old Man (老人星) or the Star of the Old Man of the South Pole (南極老人星). Since Carina is a Southern constellation, Canopus is rarely seen in Northern China and, if seen in good weather, looks reddish lying near the southern horizon. Because the color red is the symbol of happiness and longevity in China, Canopus is also known in China and the neighboring countries of Korea, Japan, and Vietnam as the Star of Old Age (壽星) or the Star of the Man of the Old Age (壽老人). In Japan, it became Jurōjin (壽老人), one of the Seven Gods of Fortune (七福神).

== Legend ==
According to legend, the Old Man of the South Pole was once a sickly boy named Zhao Yen who had been predicted to die when he was 19 years old. He was therefore advised to visit a certain field and to bring with him a jar of wine and dried meat. In that field, he would find two men intent on playing checkers under a tree. He should offer them wine and meat, but should avoid answering their questions. Zhao Yen followed the advice and when the two men had consumed the meat and the wine, they decided to thank him by exchanging the figures of his life expectancy from 19 to 91 years. Later he was told that one of the two men was the star of the North Pole, which fixes the date of birth of the men, and the other the star of the South Pole, which fixes the date of death.

== In culture ==
In the novel Investiture of the Gods, as the eldest disciple of Yuanshi Tianzun, the Old Man of the South Pole descended to help King Wu in his attack against the deity Yin. From the novel, his disciple is said to be Xianhe Tongzi, the "white crane boy" (白鶴童子).

In Journey to the West, the Old Man of the South Pole's mount, a white deer, once escaped to the nether world to become a demon (or Yaoguai). It was later defeated by the monkey king Sun Wukong and taken back by the Old Man.

According to folklore legends, the white snake spirit Bai Suzhen once went to the cave of the Old Man of the South Pole to steal medicinal herbs.

The poet Du Fu has also made mention of the Old Man in his poem 《泊松滋江亭》: "今宵南極外，甘作老人星".

== See also ==
- Shou (character)
- Fukurokuju
- Jurōjin
- Sanxing (deities)
- Sagaan Ubgen
- Peaches of Immortality
