= Seven Lucky Gods =

Japanese deities of good fortune

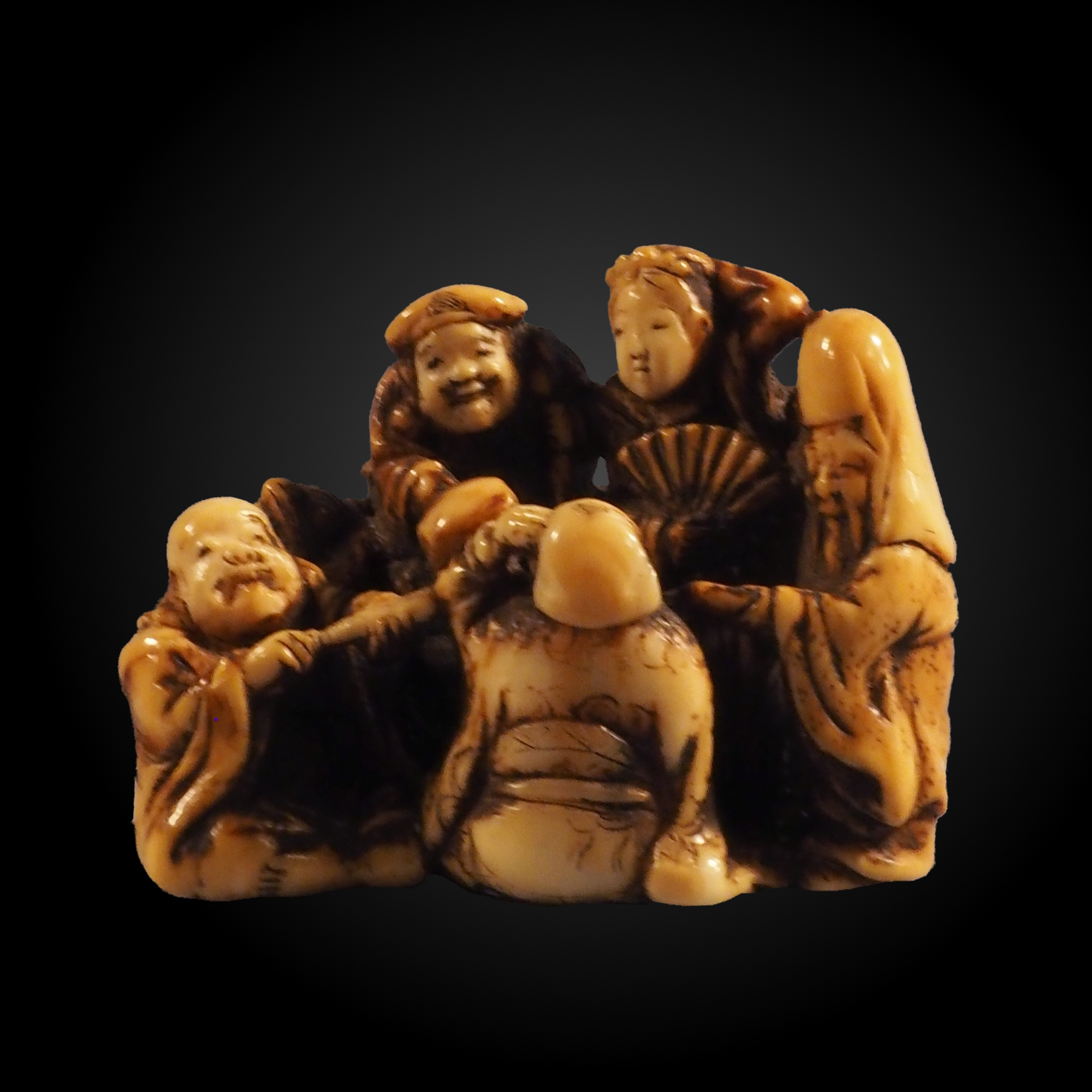
Netsuke depicting the Seven Gods of Fortune, on display at Bern Historical Museum

In Japanese mythology, the Seven Lucky Gods or Seven Gods of Fortune (七福神, Shichifukujin; Japanese pronunciation: [ɕi̥.c̟͡ɕí.ɸɯ̥̈.kɯ̈́.(ɟ̟͡)ʑìɴ̀]) are believed to grant good luck and are often represented in netsuke and in artworks. One of the seven (Jurōjin) is said to be based on a historical figure.

They all began as remote and impersonal gods, but gradually became much closer canonical figures for certain professions and Japanese arts. During the course of their history, the mutual influence between gods has created confusion about which of them was the patron of certain professions. The worship of this group of gods is also due to the importance of the number seven in Japan, supposedly a signifier of good luck.

== Origin and history ==
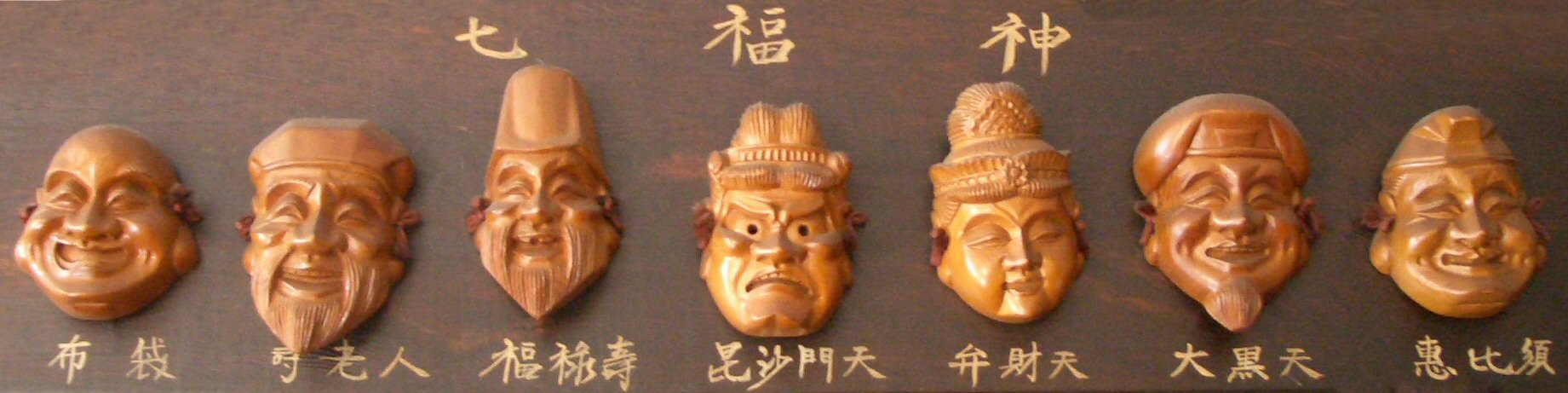
From left to right: Hotei, Jurōjin, Fukurokuju, Bishamonten, Benzaiten, Daikokuten, Ebisu

It is known that these deities mostly have their origins as ancient gods of fortune from religions popular in Japan: from Mahayana Buddhism (Benzaiten, Bishamonten, Daikokuten, Hotei) which came to Japan from China but originated in India, and from Chinese Taoism (Fukurokuju and Jurōjin); except for one (Ebisu) who has a native Japanese ancestry.

These gods have been recognized as such for over a thousand years. In the beginning, these gods were worshiped by merchants as the first two (Ebisu and Daikokuten) were gods of business and trade.

Subsequently, other classes of Japanese society looked for gods that could correspond with their professions: Benzaiten as the patron of the arts, Fukurokuju as the patron of the sciences, and so on.

In ancient times, these gods were worshiped separately, but this rarely happens today – only when it is required for the god to act on behalf of the applicant.

The Seven Gods of Fortune started being mentioned as a collective in the year 1420 in Fushimi, in order to imitate the processions of the daimyōs, the feudal lords of pre-modern Japan.

It is said that the Buddhist priest Tenkai selected these gods after speaking with the shōgun he served, Iemitsu Tokugawa, at the order of seeking whoever possessed the perfect virtues: longevity, fortune, popularity, sincerity, kindness, dignity, and magnanimity.

Shortly after, a famous artist of the time, Kanō Yasunobu, was ordained to portray these gods for the first time.

== Description of the Fukujin deities ==
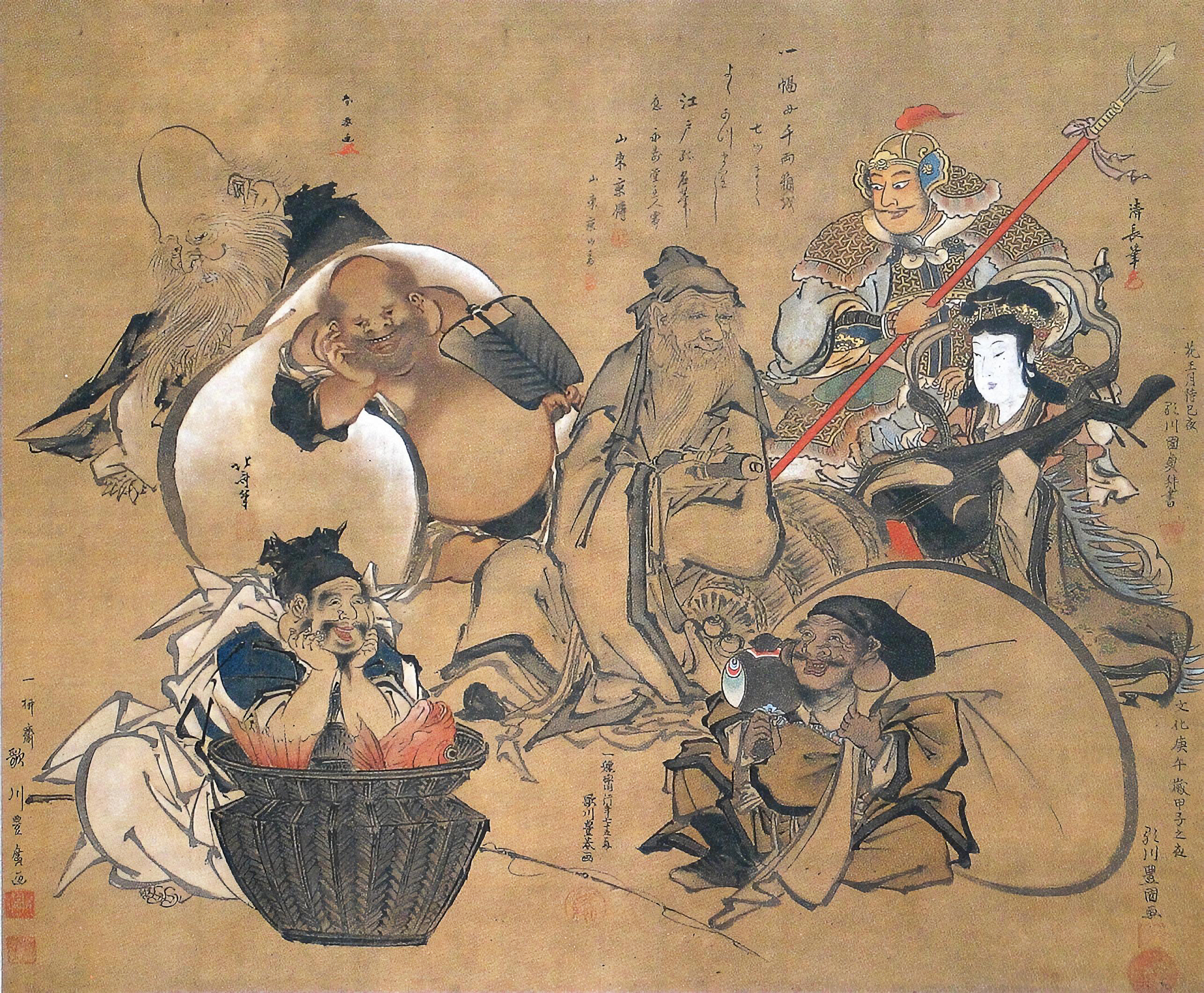
Seven Lucky Gods by Hokusai et al.

=== Ebisu ===
From the period of the gods Izanami and Izanagi, Ebisu (恵比寿) is the only one whose origins are purely Japanese. He is the god of prosperity and wealth in business, and of plenitude and abundance in crops, cereals and food in general. He is the patron of fishermen and therefore is represented with fishermen's costumes such as a typical hat, a fishing rod in his right hand and a fish that can be either a carp, a hake, a codfish or a sea bass, or any large fish, in general, that symbolize abundance in meals (such as a feast or banquet). It is now common to see his figure in restaurants where fish is served in great quantities or in household kitchens.

=== Daikokuten ===
Daikokuten (大黒天) is the god of commerce and prosperity, and he is sometimes considered the patron of cooks, farmers and bankers, and a protector of crops. He is also considered a demon hunter − legend says that the god Daikokuten hung a sacred talisman on the branch of a tree in his garden and, by using this as a trap, was able to catch a demon. This god is characterized by his smile, his short legs and the hat on his head. He is usually depicted with a bag full of valuable objects. Daikokuten's popular imagery originated as a syncretic conflation of the Buddhist death deity Mahākāla with the Shinto deity Ōkuninushi. The Japanese name Daikoku is a direct translation of the Sanskrit name Mahākāla which means "Great Blackness". Per the Butsuzōzui compendium of 1690 (reprinted and expanded in 1796), Daikoku can also manifest as a female known as Daikokunyo (大黒女, lit. "She of Great Blackness") or Daikokutennyo (大黒天女, lit. "She of Great Blackness of the Heavens").

=== Bishamonten ===
Bishamonten's (毘沙門天) origins can be traced back to Hinduism, but he has been adopted into Japanese culture. He comes from the Hindu god Kubera and is also known by the name "Vaisravana".

He is the god of fortune in war and battles, also associated with authority and dignity. He is the protector of those who follow the rules and behave appropriately. As the patron of fighters, he is represented dressed in armour and a helmet, and is often seen carrying a pagoda. He also acts as the protector of holy sites and important places and wields a spear to fight against evil spirits. He is usually depicted in illustrations with a hoop of fire.

=== Benzaiten ===
Benzaiten's (弁才天 or 弁財天) origin is found in Hinduism, as she comes from the Hindu goddess Saraswati. She is the only female Fukujin in the modern grouping, and may be named in various ways: Benzaiten (弁才天), Benten (弁天), Bentensama (弁天様), or Benzaitennyo (弁才天女). When she was adapted from Buddhism, she was given the attributes of financial fortune, talent, beauty and music among others. Often, her figure appears with a torii. She is represented as a smart, beautiful woman with all the aforementioned attributes. She carries a biwa, a Japanese traditional lute-like instrument, and is normally accompanied by a white snake. She is the patron of artists, writers, dancers, and geisha, among others.

=== Jurōjin ===
Considered the incarnation of the southern pole star (南極星 "nankyokusei"), Juroujin (寿老人) is the god of the elderly and of longevity in Japanese Buddhist mythology. It is said that the legendary Juroujin is based on a real person who lived in ancient times. He was approximately 1.82 meters tall with a very long head. Besides his distinctive skull, he is represented with a long white beard, riding a deer, and is often also accompanied by a 1500-year-old crane and a tortoise, as symbols of his affinity with long lives. In addition, he is usually represented under a peach tree, as the fruit of this tree is considered, by Chinese Taoism, as able to prolong life. In his hand he holds a cane and a book or a scroll. The wisdom of the world remains written in its pages. Jurojin enjoys rice and wine and is a very cheerful figure.

=== Hotei ===
Hotei (布袋) is the god of fortune, guardian of children, patron of diviners and barmen, and also the god of popularity. He is depicted as a fat, smiling, bald man with a curly moustache. He always appears half-naked, as his clothes are not wide enough to cover his enormous belly. He blessed the Chinese, and they nicknamed him "Cho-Tei-Shi" or "Ho-Tei-Shi", which means ‘bag of old clothes’.

Hotei was a Zen priest, but his appearance and some of his actions were against their moral code: his appearance made him look like quite a mischievous person and he had no fixed place to sleep.

He carries a bag on his shoulders which is loaded with fortunes for those who believe in his virtues. Hotei's traits and virtues are contentment, magnanimity, and happiness.

Hotei's original Chinese name was Kaishi, and according to legend, he died in March 916.

The Japanese began to believe in Hotei during the Edo era. The reason why the Japanese have such great respect for this god comes from a legend that says that, before Zen Buddhism arrived in Japan, an alternative Buddhist thought was extended by a priest of dubious aesthetic, who actually was a manifestation of Miroku. Miroku was the patron of those who could not be saved by the beliefs of Buddha, and Hotei was later perceived and accepted by the Japanese as a second Miroku.

=== Fukurokuju (sometimes omitted) ===
The god Fukurokuju (福禄寿) also has his origins in China. It is believed that he used to be a hermit during the Chinese Song dynasty, distinguished for being a reincarnation of the Taoist god Hsuan-wu. He is the god of wisdom, luck, longevity, wealth and happiness. This god receives certain credits, such as being one of the Chinese philosophers who could live without eating (breatharian). Moreover, he is the only god who was said to have the ability to resurrect the dead.

Fukurokuju is characterized by the size of his head, being almost as large as the size of his whole body, and is represented wearing traditional Chinese costumes. He normally carries a cane in one hand and in the other a scroll with writings about the world. He is usually accompanied by a turtle, a crane or a deer, animals that are frequently used in Japan to symbolize a long life.

It is also said that he likes to play chess, and hence is the patron of chess players. The characteristics of Fukurokuju and Jurōjin overlap as they both trace back to the Chinese Taoist deity Nánjílǎorén (南极老人), which is why Fukurokuju's position is sometimes granted instead to the goddess Kichijōten, as in the Butsuzōzui compendium of 1783.

=== Kichijōten (sometimes omitted) ===
Kichijōten (吉祥天), a Fukujin goddess is also known as Kisshōten or Kisshoutennyo (吉祥天女), and is adapted via Buddhism from the Hindu goddess Lakshmi. Kisshōten has the traits of beauty, happiness, and fertility. In the 1783 edition of the Butsuzōzui compendium, Kichijōten replaces Fukurokuju as one of the Fukujin. Kichijōten's iconography is distinguished from the other Fukujin goddesses by the Nyoihōju gem (如意宝珠) in her hand. When Kichijōten replaces Fukurokuju, and Daikoku is regarded in feminine form, all three of the Hindu Tridevi goddesses are then represented among the seven Fukujin.

== Takarabune ==
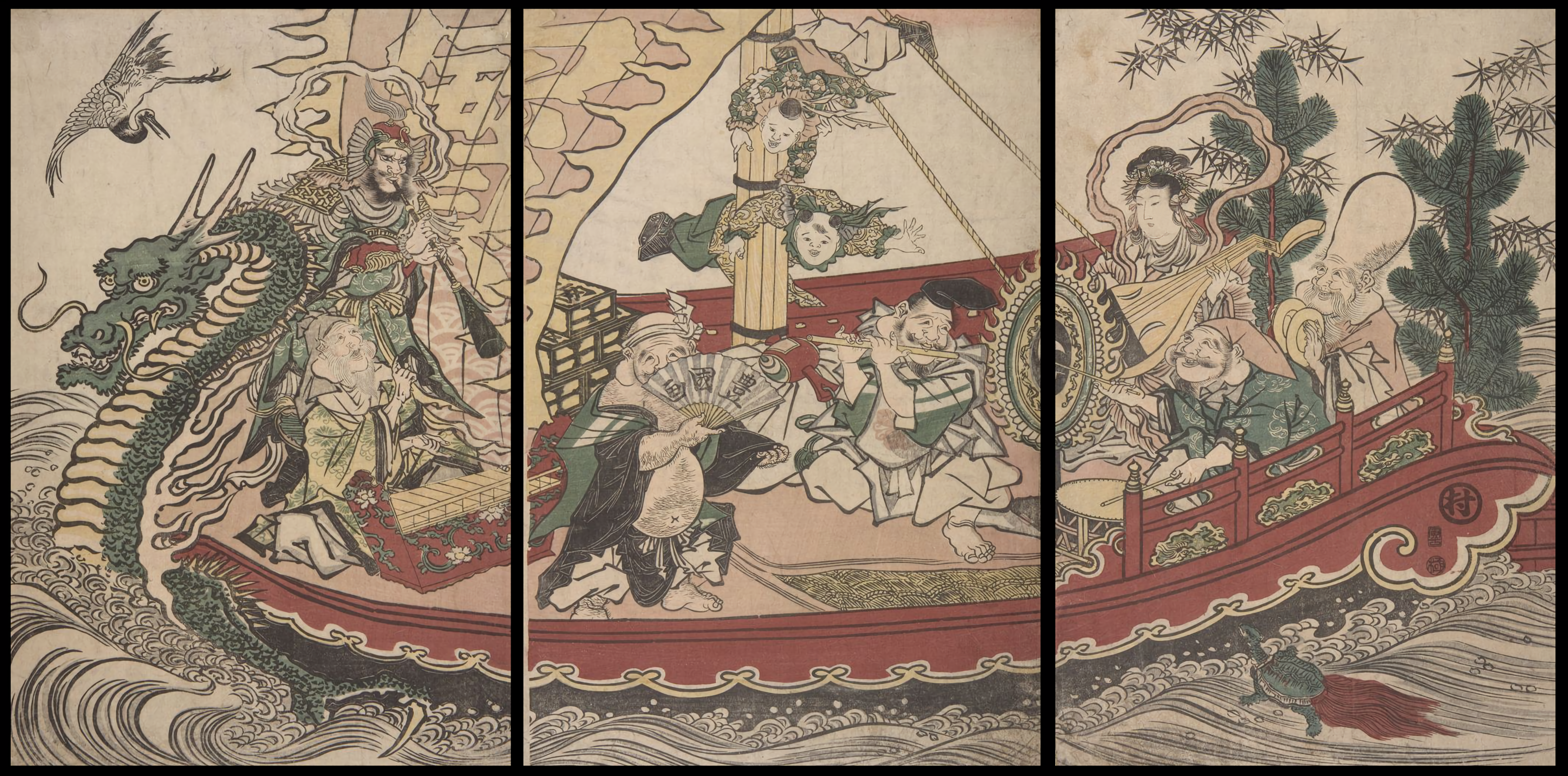
Ukiyo-e of the lucky gods on a Takarabune by Utagawa Toyokuni

During the first three days of the New Year the Seven Lucky Gods are said to pilot through the heavens the Takarabune or Treasure Ship. A picture of the ship forms an essential part of traditional Japanese New Year celebrations.

== Location of shrines ==
- Imamiya Ebisu Shrine, Osaka
- Nanyo – Kanjizai-ji, Shikoku
- Nishinomiya Shrine, Hyogo
- Toka Ebisu Shrine, Fukuoka

== Gallery ==
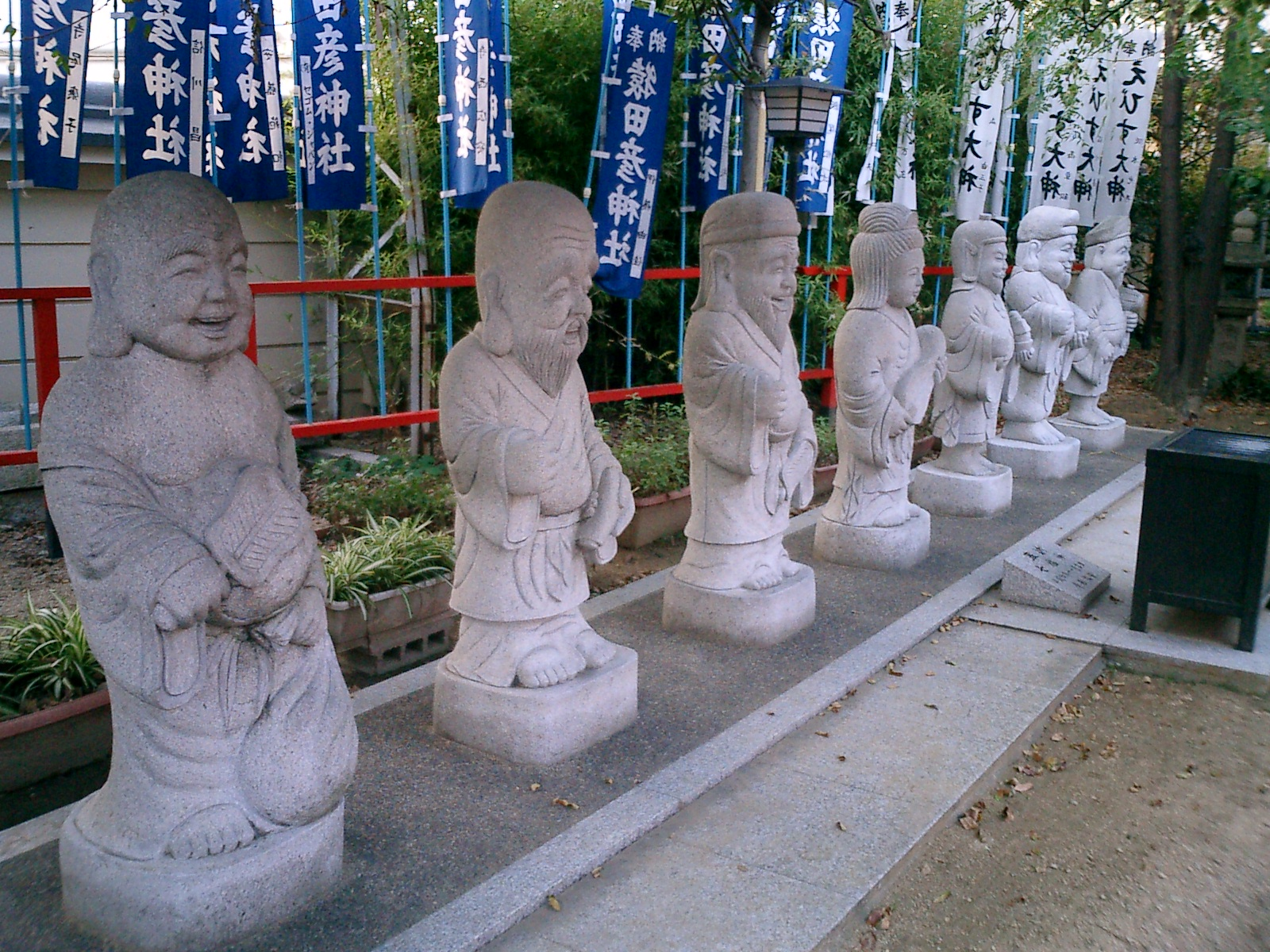
The Seven Lucky Gods at Watatsumi Shrine in Tarumi-ku, Kobe

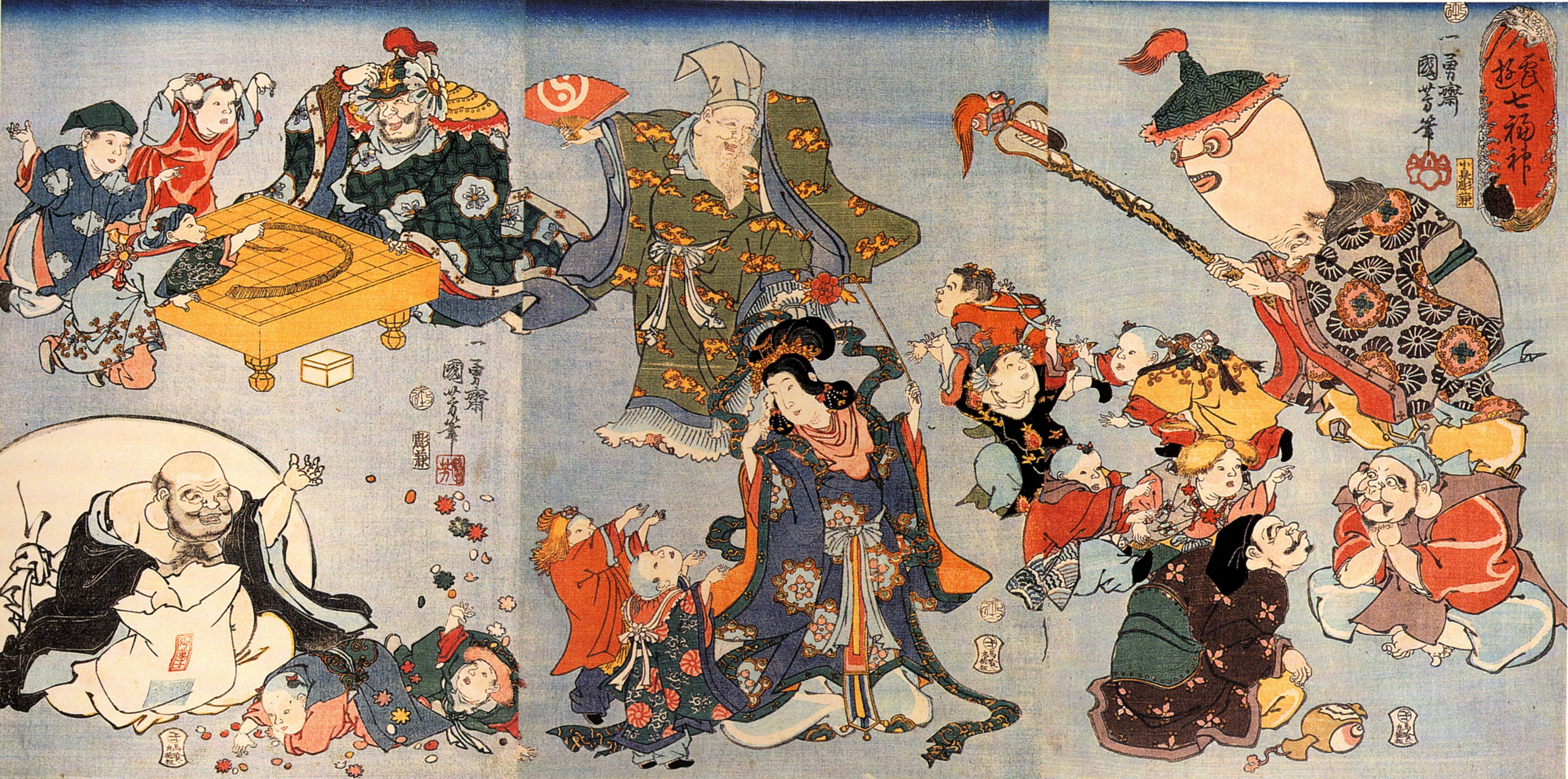
The Seven Lucky Gods in a woodblock print by Utagawa Kuniyoshi

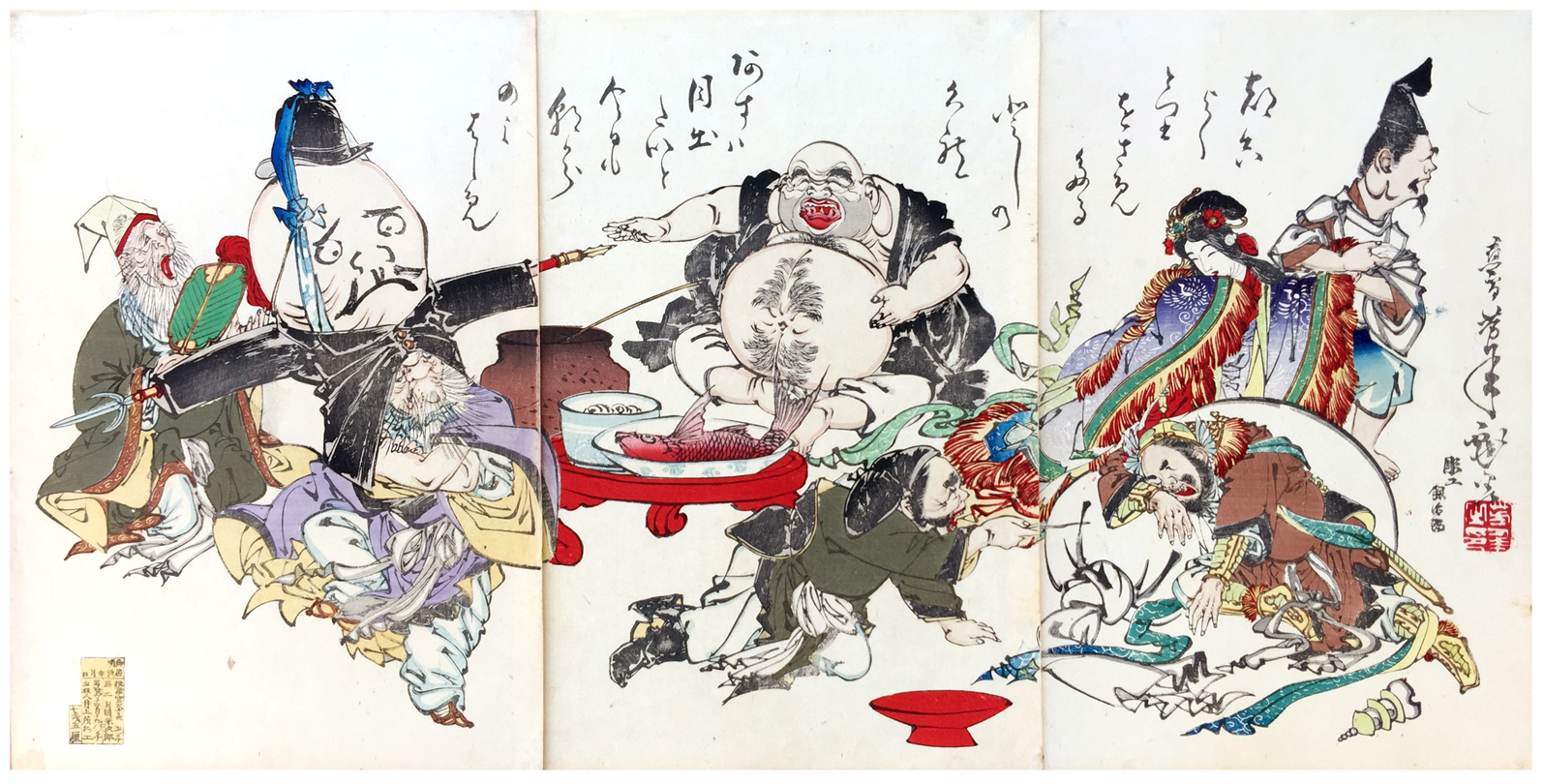
The Seven Lucky Gods, in an 1882 woodblock print by Tsukioka Yoshitoshi

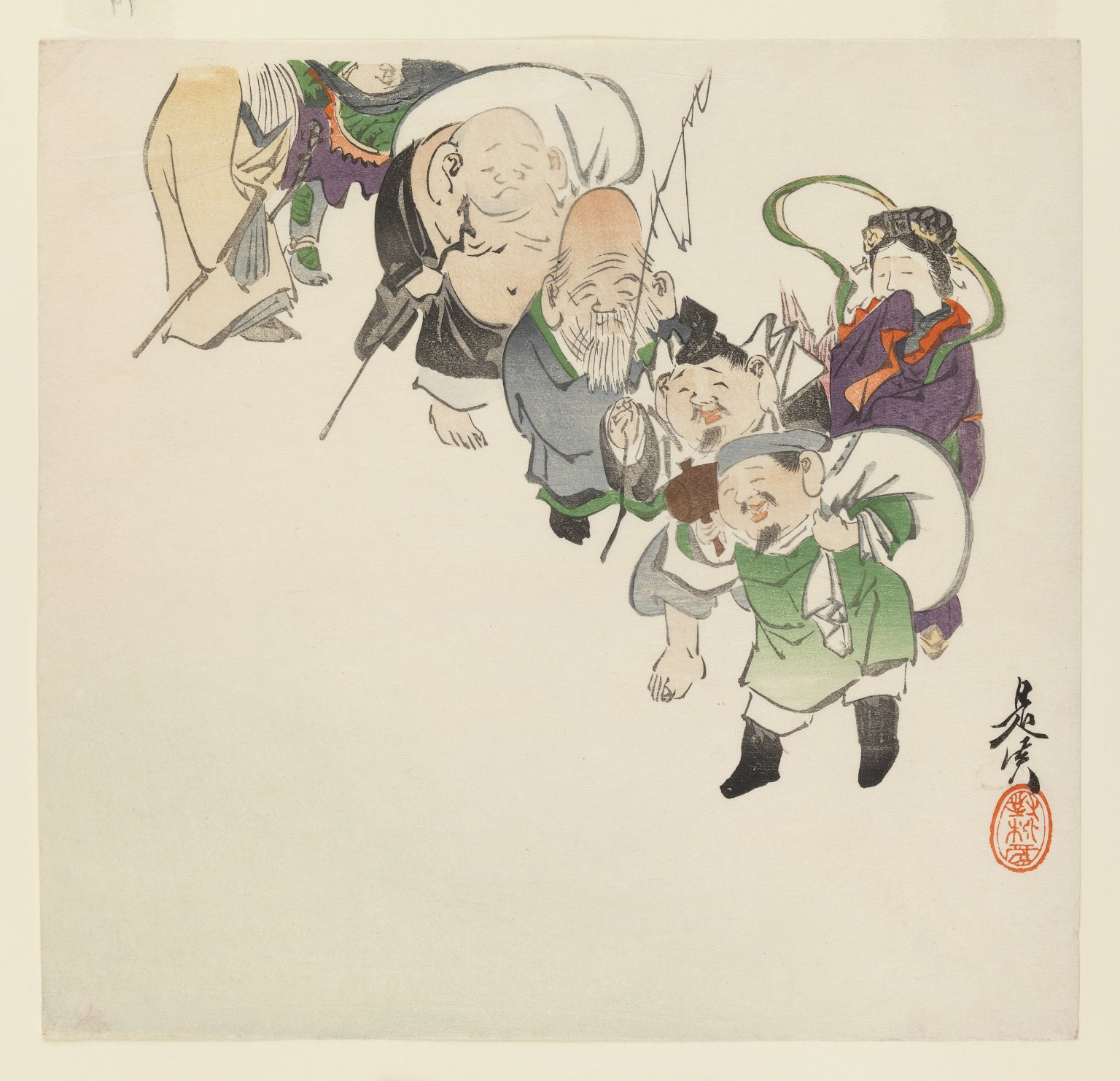
Brooklyn Museum - Shibata Zeshin (Japanese, 1807−1891). Seven Gods of Good Luck, c. 1885

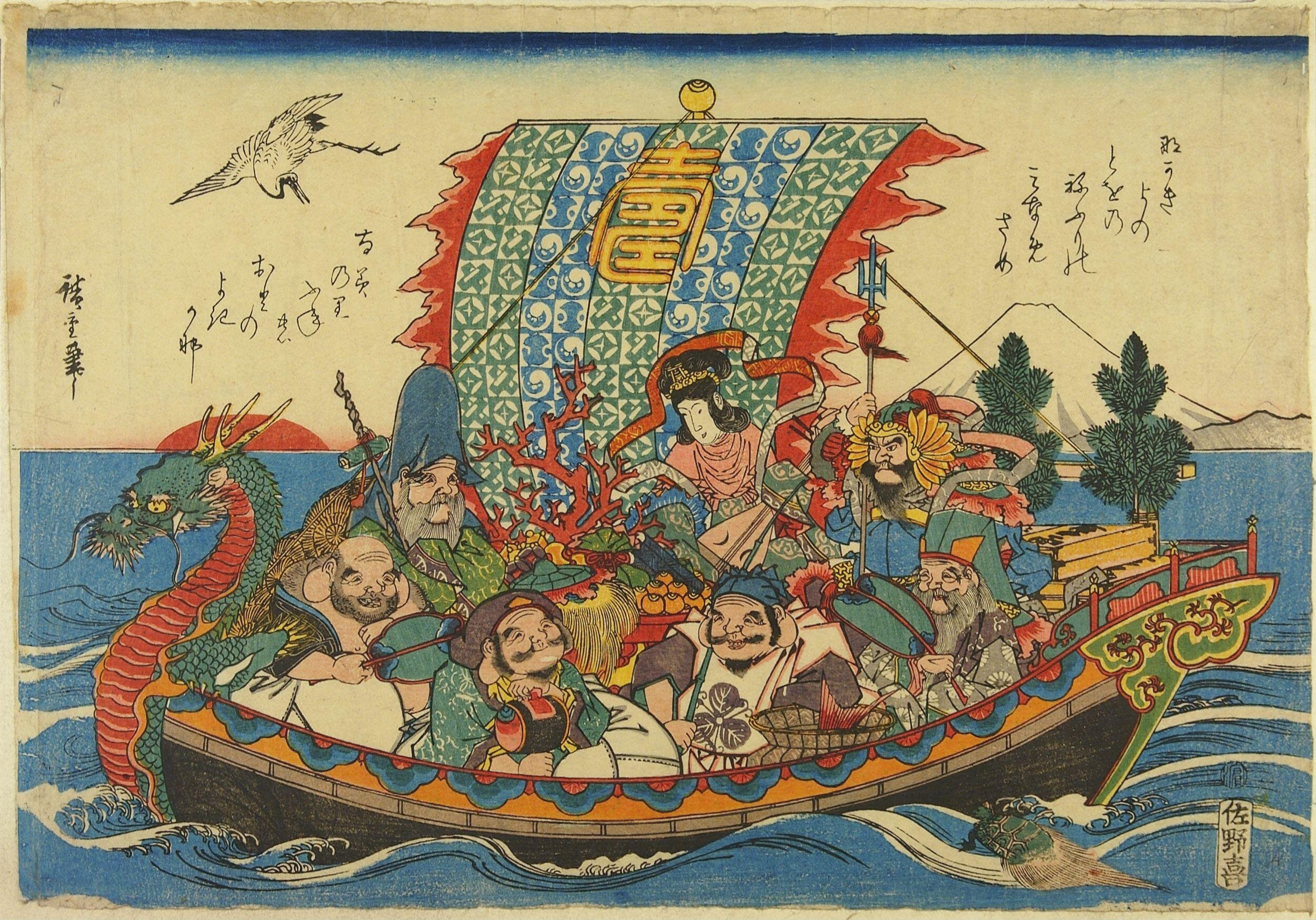
Coloured woodblock print of the Takarabune by Utagawa Hiroshige

== See also ==
- Eight Immortals, a similar group of Taoist immortals
- Fu, Lu, and Shou (福祿壽), three deities of stars from Chinese folk religion, representing auspiciousness, good life and longevity.
- He-He Er Xian (和合二仙), Immortals of Harmony and Union, associated with happy marriages
- Matryoshka doll, inspired by shichifukujin nested dolls
