= Butsuzōzui =

Collection of Buddhist iconographic sketches

The Butsuzōzui (仏像図彙) ("Illustrated Compendium of Buddhist Images") is a collection of Buddhist iconographic sketches said to have been painted by Hidenobu Tosa (土佐秀信, Tosa, Hidenobu) of the Tosa school. Originally published in 1690 (Genroku 3) in five volumes, it comprises more than 800 sketches, inspired by the Chinese style of paintings called Paihuo, with the Buddhist icons divided into five parts and further categorized. In Edo-period Japan the Butsuzōzui compendium was the most widely distributed source for information on Buddhist and Shinbutsu deities.

Included area of interest ranges from Nyorai and Bosatsu as well as folk deities including Kijin (鬼神), Rekijin (暦神) and Shūgōshin (習合神) as well as fixtures and tools and fixtures applied to rituals (仏具、祭器; Butsugu, saiki). However criticized for errors and misunderstanding, a revised and expanded edition, "Zōho shoshū butsuzō zui (増補諸宗 仏像図彙)" was issued in 1792 (Kansei 4), a person in Ōsaka, Tosa shōsō Ki no Hidenobu (土佐将曹紀秀信) . The note to the first edition tells that it was edited by Shigetsuken Gizan (指月軒義山).

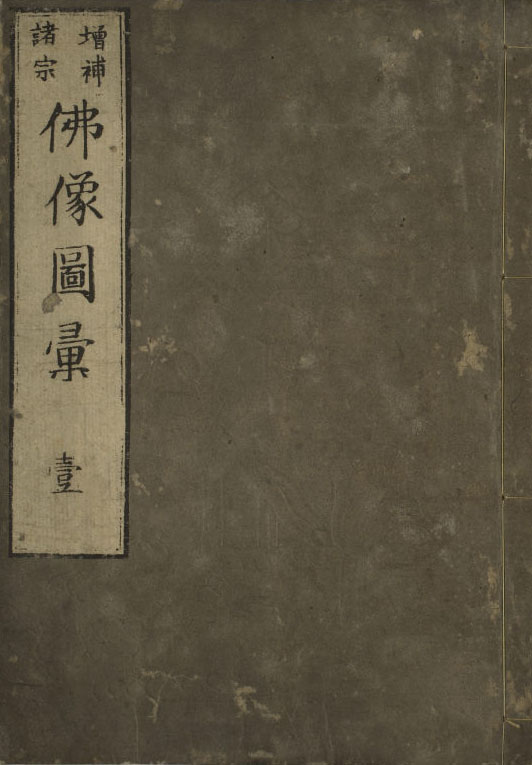
Butsuzōzui

== See also ==
- Daikokunyo (goddess)
- Kichijōten (goddess)
