= Jurōjin =

Taoist deity

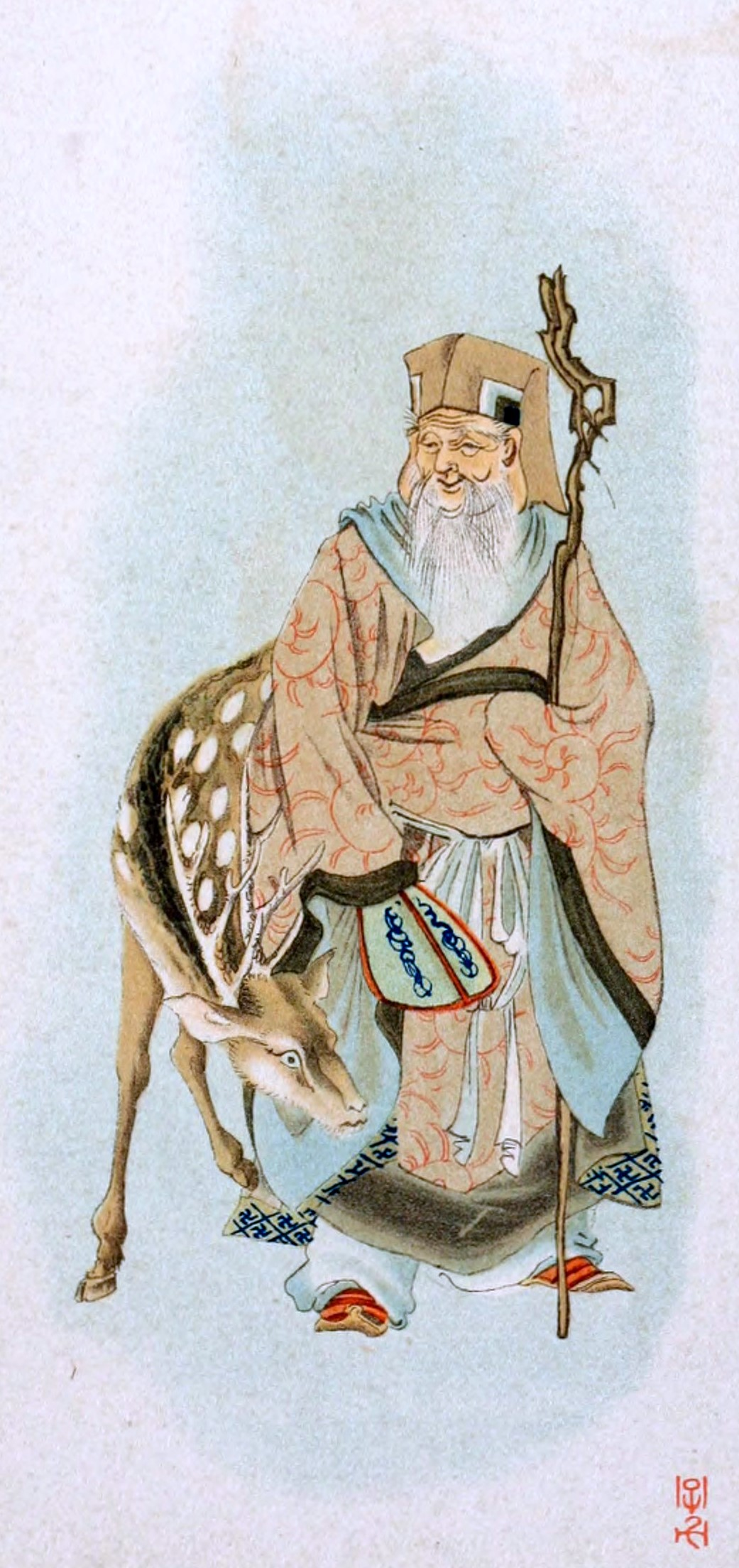
Jurōjin with deer

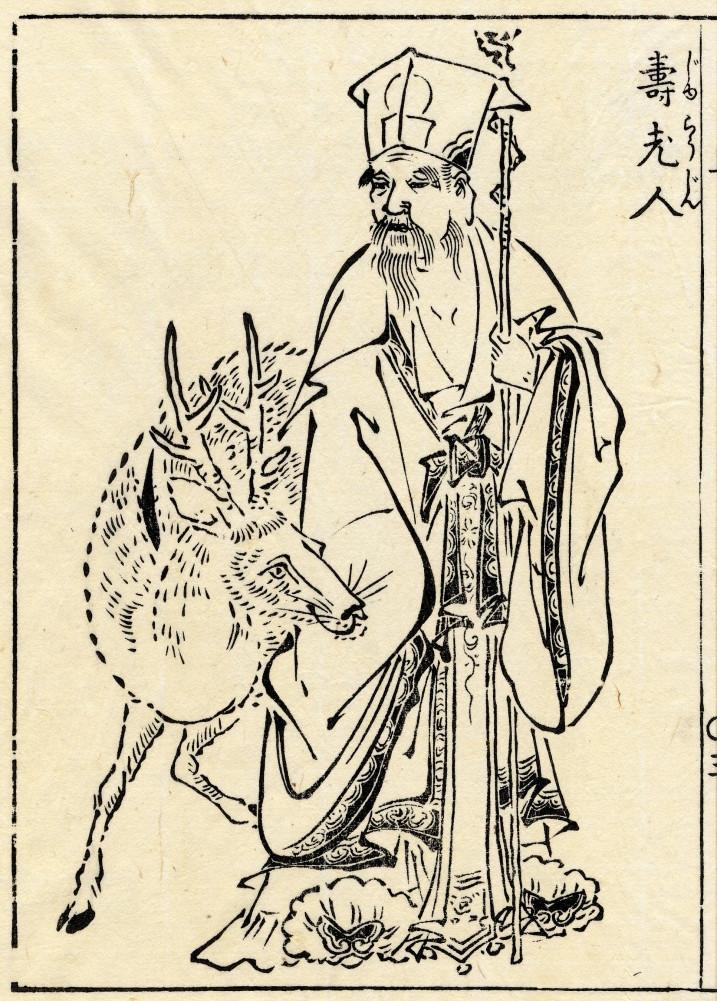
Japanese god of longevity

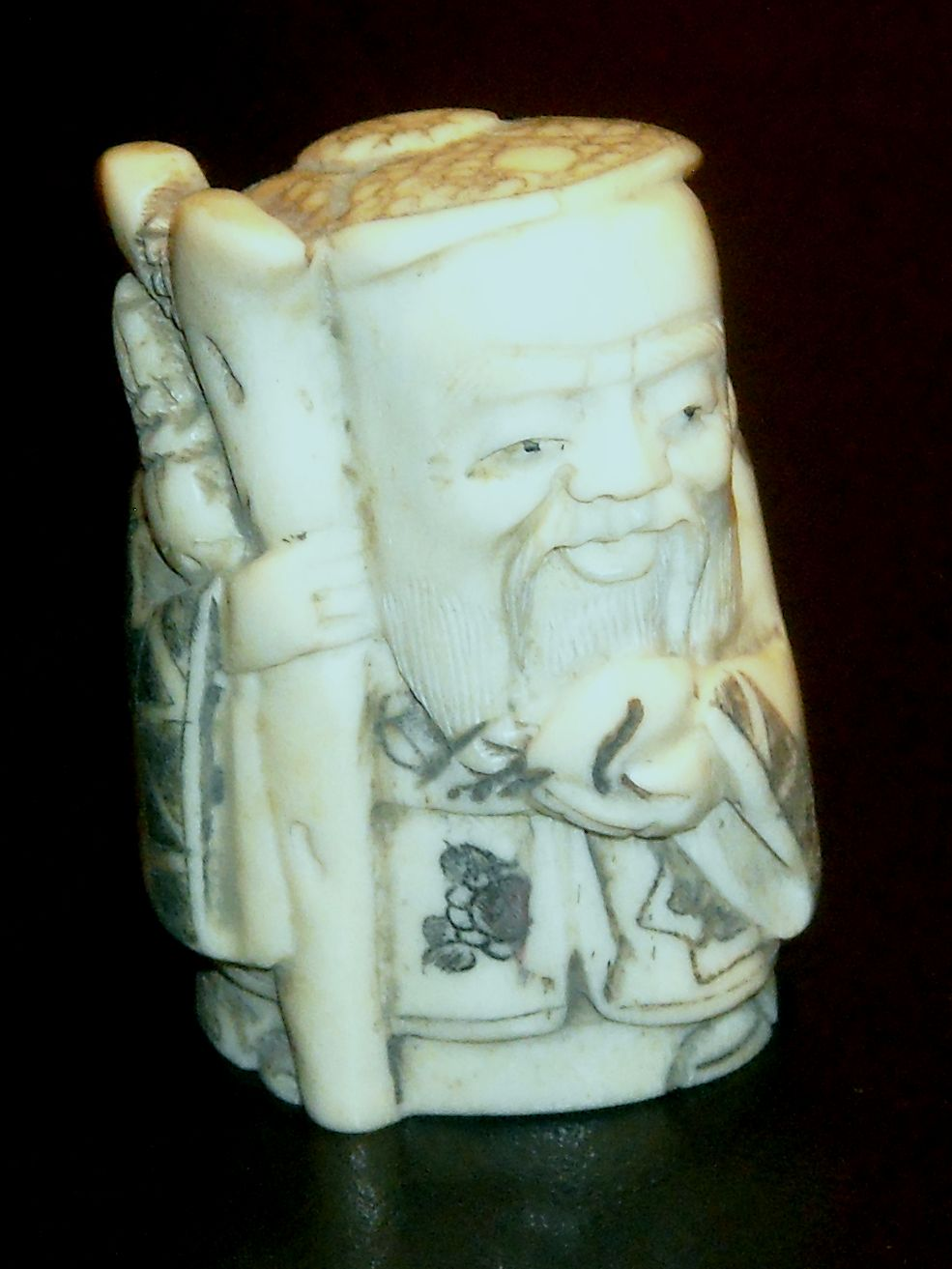
Jurojin. Netsuke.

Jurōjin (寿老人; Japanese pronunciation: [ɟ̟͡ʑɨ̀.ɾó̞ò̞.(ɟ̟͡)ʑìɴ̀]; lit. 'Old Man of Longevity') is one of Japanese mythology's Seven Gods of Fortune or Shichifukujin. He is the god of longevity. Jurōjin originated from the Chinese Taoist god, the Old Man of the South Pole or Star of the Old Man. He is known as the immortal of the Northern Song dynasty (960–1127), and may have been a historical figure of the period. Jurōjin is identified as the personification of the imagined Southern Polar Star. While paintings and statues of Jurōjin are considered auspicious, he never developed a following in Japan independent of the other Seven Gods of Fortune.

People believe himself as the god of wisdom, and longevity being alive for 500 years.

Jurōjin is often identified with Fukurokuju, another of the Seven Gods of Fortune. In some accounts, the two are said to inhabit the same body. As such, the two are often confused.

Jurōjin walks with a staff and a fan. He is depicted as an old man of slight stature, and by tradition, less than 3 shaku (approximately 90 centimetres (35 in)). He is depicted with a long white beard and often a very tall, bald head. He has a scroll tied to his staff, on which is written the lifespan of all living things. The scroll is sometimes identified as a Buddhist sutra. The deer, a symbol of longevity, usually (but not always) accompanies him as a messenger, as do other long-lived animals such as the crane and the tortoise.

Jurōjin is a popular subject of Japanese ink wash paintings. He was introduced into the Japanese art tradition by Zen Buddhist painters, and depictions of Jurōjin span from the Muromachi period (1337–1573) through the Edo period (1603–1868). Artists who depicted Jurōjin as a subject include Sesshū (1420–1506), Sesson Shukei (1504–1589), Kanō Tan'yū (1602–1674), and Maruyama Ōkyo (1733–1795).

== See also ==
- Fukurokuju
- Fu, Lu, and Shou
- Old Man of the South Pole
