= Fukurokuju =

God of the Japanese mythology

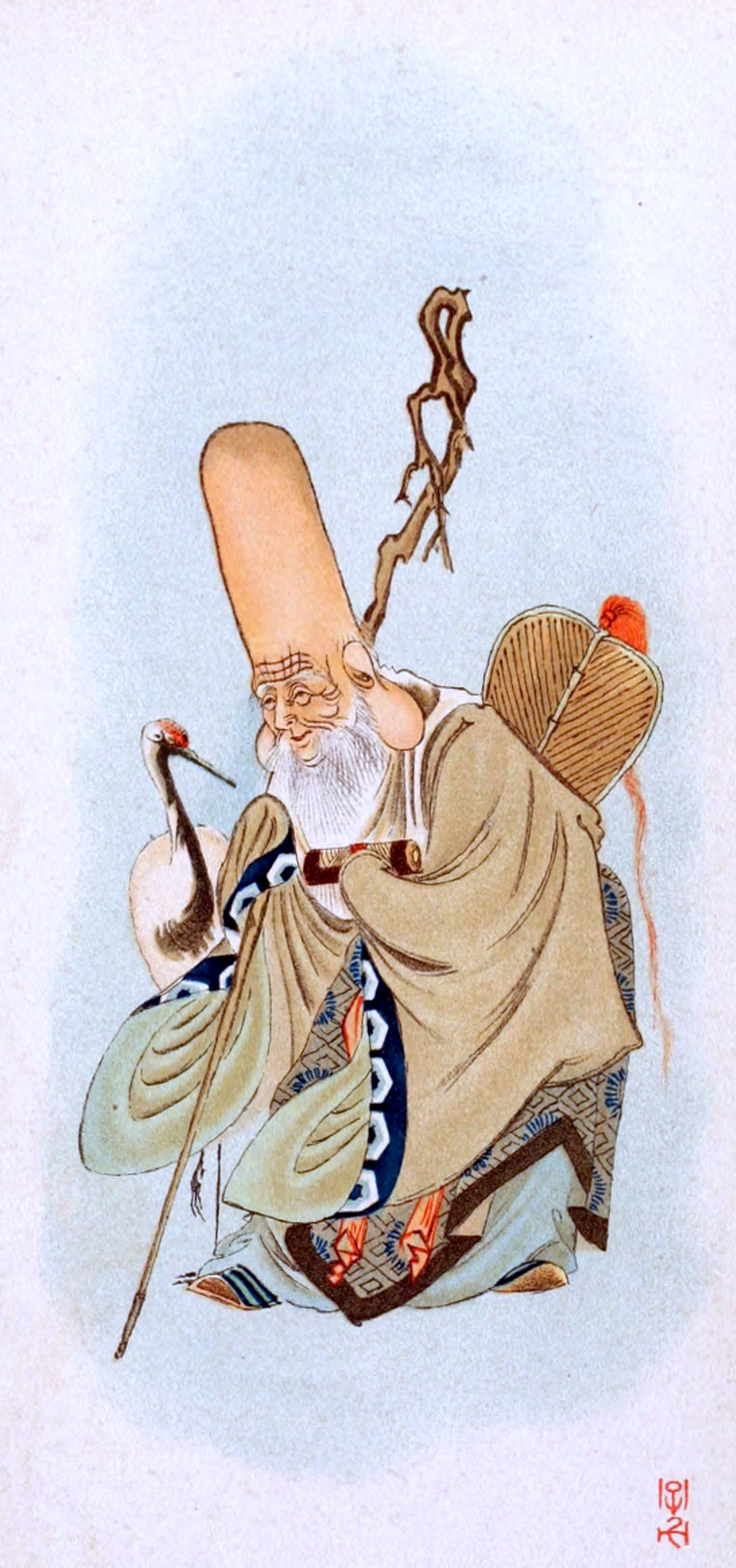
Fukurokuju

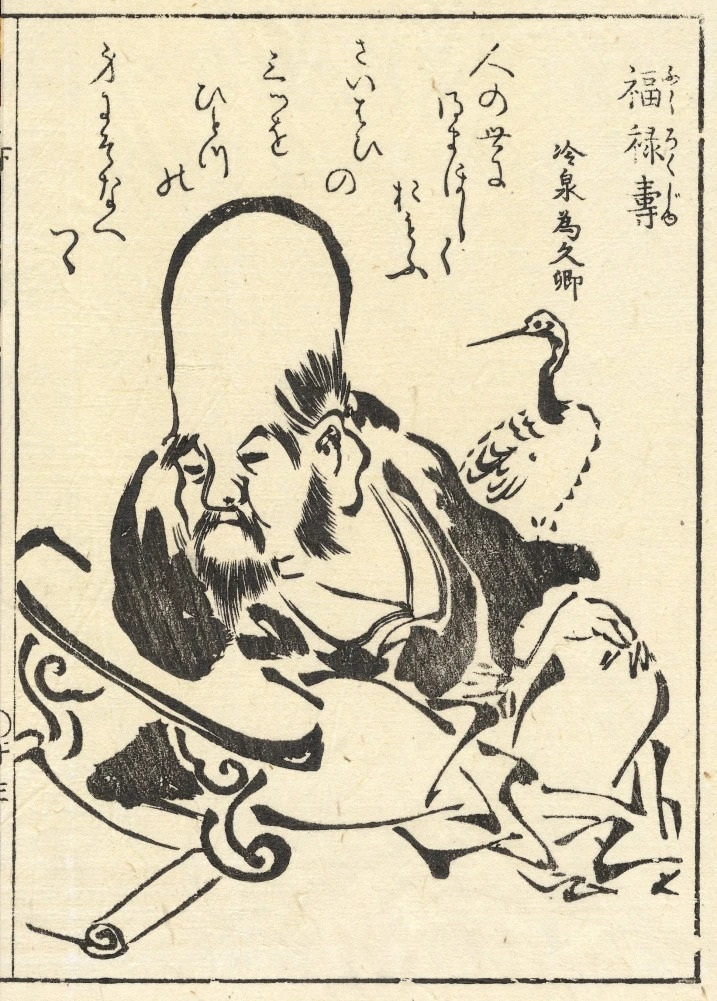
Fukurokuju by Morikuni (1679–1748)

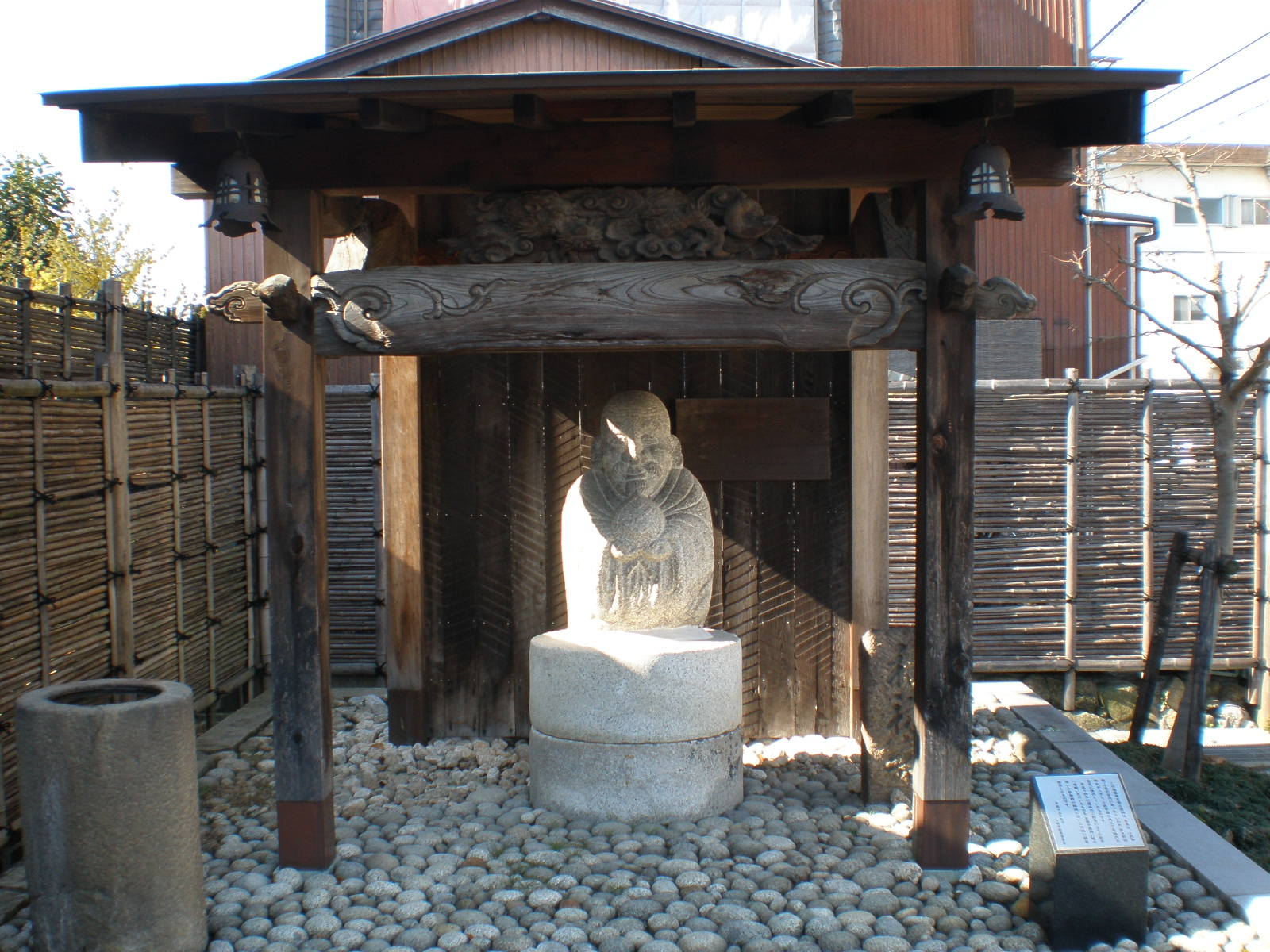
A stone sculpture of Fukurokuju in Komaki, Aichi Prefecture

In Japan, Fukurokuju (福禄寿; Japanese pronunciation: [ɸɯ̥̈.kɯ̈́.ɾó̞.kɯ̈̀.(ɟ̟͡)ʑɨ̀, -ɾó̞.kɯ̈́-]) is one of the Seven Lucky Gods in Japanese mythology. It has been theorized that he is a Japanese assimilation of the Chinese Three Star Gods (traditional Chinese: 福祿壽; simplified Chinese: 福禄寿; pinyin: Fú Lù Shòu; Cantonese Yale: Fūk Luhk Sauh) embodied in one deity. Most related in appearance to the Chinese star god Shou, he is the God of wisdom and longevity. According to some, before attaining divinity, he was a Chinese hermit of the Song dynasty and a reincarnation of the Taoist Deity, Xuantian Shangdi. It is said that during his human incarnation, he was a sennin; an immortal who could exist without eating food.

== Origin ==
Fukurokuju probably originated from an old Chinese tale about a mythical Chinese Taoist hermit sage renowned for performing miracles in the Northern Song period (960–1127). In China, this hermit (also known as Jurōjin) was thought to embody the celestial powers of the south polar star. Fukurokuju was not always included in the earliest representations of the Seven in Japan. He was instead replaced by Kisshōten (goddess of fortune, beauty, and merit). He is now, however, an established member of the Seven Lucky Gods.

He is sometimes confused with Jurōjin, another of the Several Gods of Fortune, who by some accounts is Fukurokuju's grandson and by other accounts inhabits the same body as Fukurokuju. As such, the two are often confused.

== Portrayal ==
Fukurokuju is usually portrayed as bald with long whiskers and an elongated forehead. He is said to be an incarnation of the "Southern Polestar" (南极老人, literally Old Man of the South Pole), also known as the star Canopus outside of Asia. The sacred book tied to his staff either contains the lifespan of every person on earth or a magical scripture. He is accompanied by a crane and a turtle, which are considered to be symbols of longevity. He is also sometimes accompanied by a black deer (ancient legends say a deer turns black if it is over 2000 years old).

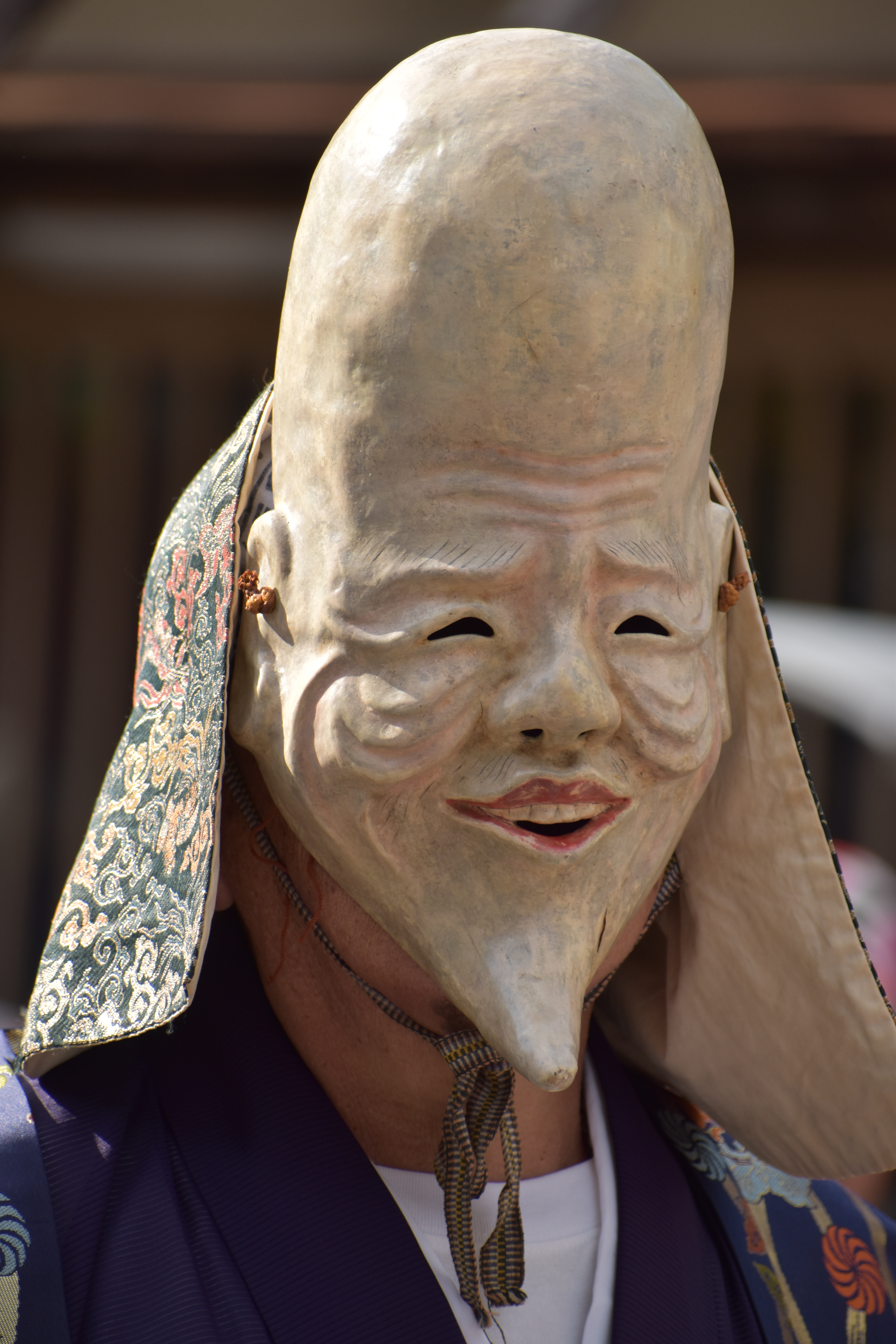
Fukurokuju at the Menkake Gyōretsu festival in Kamakura

He is the only member of the Seven Lucky Gods credited with the ability to resurrect the dead.

== See also ==
- Kuebiko
- Old Man of the South Pole

== Bibliography ==
- Media related to Fukurokuju at Wikimedia Commons
- Ashkenazi, Michael (2003). Handbook of Japanese Mythology. Santa Barbara, California: ABC-CLIO. ISBN 978-1-57607-467-1.
- Chiba, Reiko (28 August 2012). Seven Lucky Gods of Japan. Tuttle Publishing. ISBN 978-1-4629-0420-4.
