= Sanxing (deities) =

Gods of three stars in Chinese religion

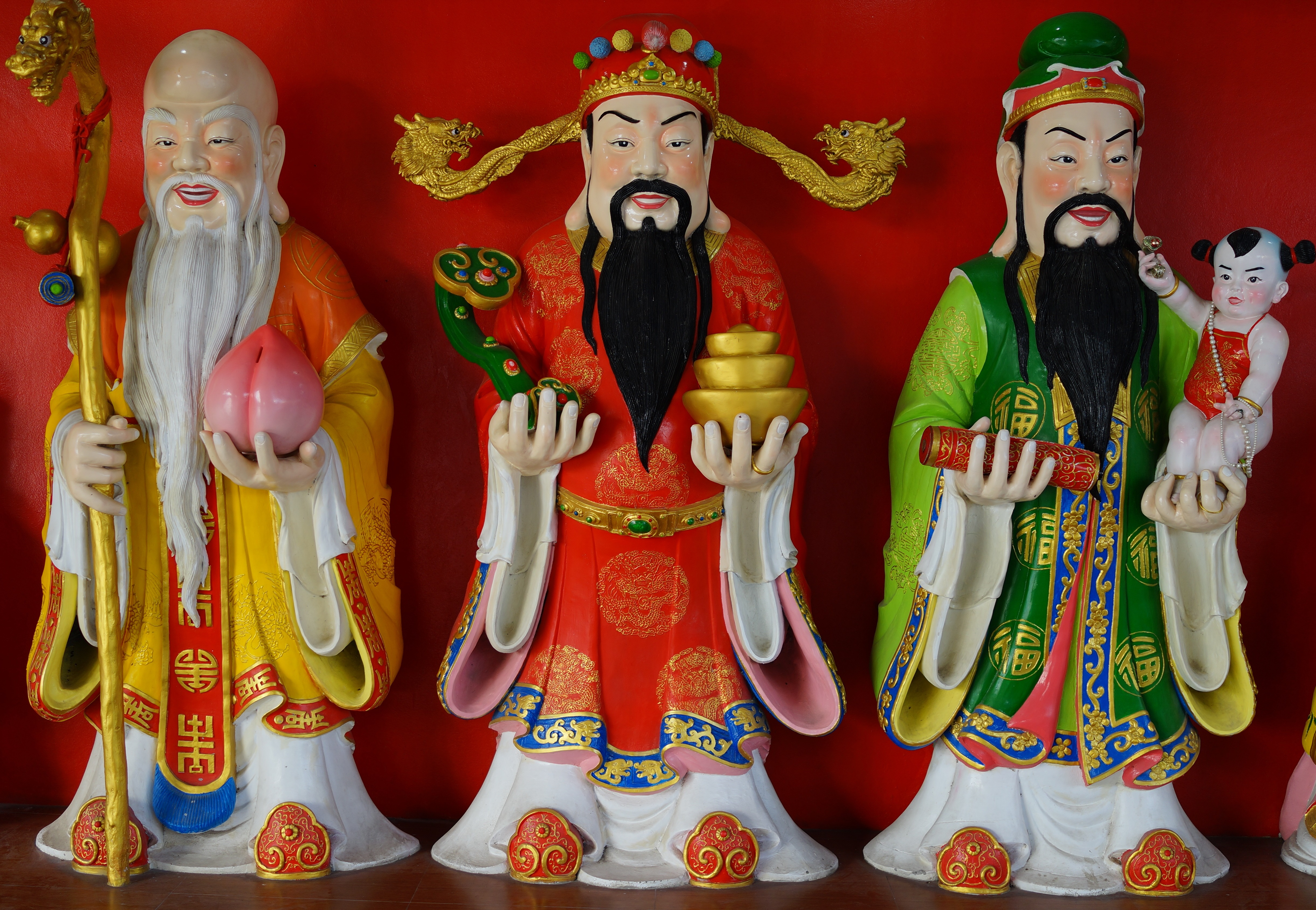
- Shou, Lu, and Fu gods at a Chinese folk religious temple in Bangkok, Thailand

Chinese name
- Traditional Chinese: 福祿壽
- Simplified Chinese: 福禄寿
Transcriptions
Standard Mandarin
- Hanyu Pinyin: Fú Lù Shòu
Yue: Cantonese
- Yale Romanization: Fūk Luhk Sauh
- Jyutping: Fuk1 Luk6 Sau6
Southern Min
- Hokkien POJ: Hok-lo̍k-siū

Vietnamese name
- Vietnamese alphabet: Phước Lộc Thọ; Phúc Lộc Thọ
- Chữ Hán: 福祿壽

Japanese name
- Kanji: 福禄寿
Transcriptions
- Romanization: Fuku Roku Ju

The Sanxing (Chinese: 三星; pinyin: sānxīng; lit. 'Three Stars') are the gods of three celestial bodies of particular significance in Chinese astronomy and Chinese folk religion: Jupiter, Mizar in Ursa Major, and Canopus. Fu, Lu, and Shou (traditional Chinese: 福祿壽; simplified Chinese: 福禄寿; pinyin: Fú Lù Shòu; Cantonese Yale: Fūk Luhk Sauh), or Cai, Zi and Shou (財子壽) are the embodiments of Fortune (Fu), presiding over the planet Jupiter; Prosperity (Lu), presiding over Mizar (ζ Ursae Majoris); and Longevity (Shou), presiding over Canopus. They have emerged from Chinese folk religion. Their iconic representation as three old, bearded, wise men dates back to the Ming dynasty, when the gods of the three stars were represented in human form for the first time. They are sometimes identified with other deities of Chinese religion or of Taoism.

The term is commonly used in Chinese culture to denote the three attributes of a good life. Statues of these three gods are found on the facades of folk religion's temples, ancestral shrines, in homes and many Chinese-owned shops, often on small altars with a glass of water, an orange or other auspicious offerings, especially during Chinese New Year. Traditionally, they are arranged right to left (Shou on the left of the viewer, Lu in the middle, and Fu on the far right), just as Chinese characters are traditionally written from right to left.

The three deities are widely associated with feng shui and are considered auspicious presences in the home.

== Astronomical origins ==
The three gods originate in ancient Chinese star worship, each being the personification of a named celestial body.

The star of Shou (Shòuxīng, 壽星, "Star of Longevity") corresponds to Canopus (α Carinae), known in Chinese astronomy as Nanji Laoren (南極老人, "Old Man of the South Pole"). Sima Qian recorded it in the Shiji as the longevity star of the south polar region, noting that its appearance over China was held to herald a time of peace. Because Canopus transits very low across the southern horizon and is rarely visible from northern China, its sighting was regarded as a propitious and unusual event.

The star of Fu (Fúxīng, 福星, "Star of Fortune") corresponds to the planet Jupiter, known in classical Chinese astronomy as the "Year Star" (歲星, Suìxīng) because its sidereal period is approximately twelve years, matching the twelve-year cycle of the Earthly Branches. Jupiter was regarded as an auspicious planet whose position in the sky determined the fortunate direction for activities.

The star of Lu (Lùxīng, 祿星, "Star of Prosperity") corresponds to Mizar (ζ Ursae Majoris), the sixth star in the Wenchang asterism (文昌六) in traditional Chinese astronomy, associated with official rank and literary success.

== Corresponding stars and attributes ==
=== Fuxing ===
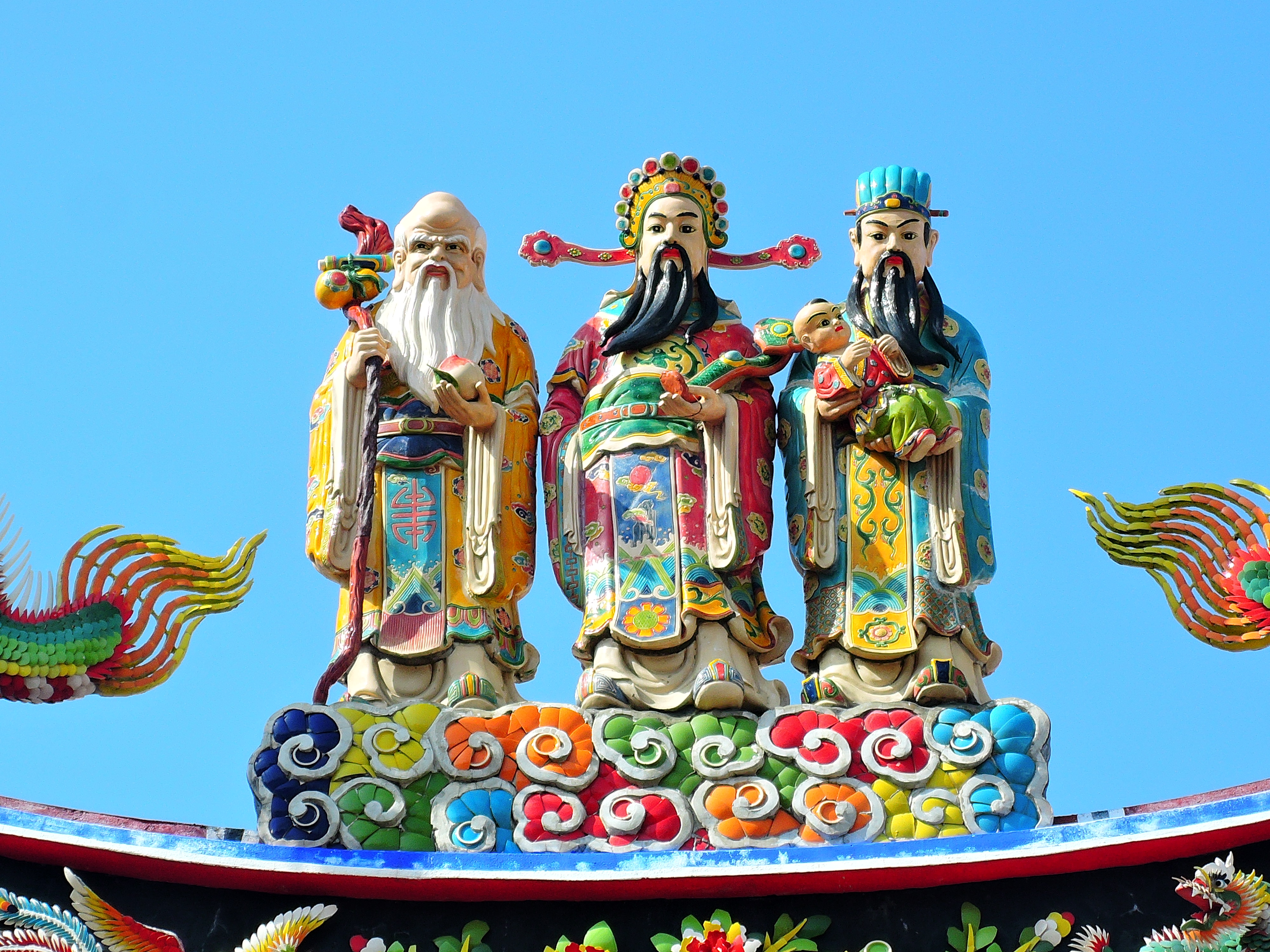
The Roof Decoration of Sanxing. At Magong Beiji Temple, Taiwan

The star of Fu (福), or Fuxing (福星; fúxīng; 'Star of fortune'), corresponds to the planet Jupiter. According to folkloric beliefs, the planet is believed to be auspicious and would bring prosperity to those who receive its light.

Alternatively, according to a Ming dynasty Taoist myth, the star of fortune is associated with Yang Cheng (Chinese: 楊成), a governor of Daozhou in the Tang dynasty. Yang Cheng risked his life attempting to convince the emperor to free court dwarfs kept as slaves. After his death, the people built a temple to commemorate him, and over time he came to be considered the personification of good fortune.

Fuxing is generally depicted in scholar's dress with golden trim, holding a scroll, on which is sometimes written the character "Fu" (福). He may also be seen holding a child, or surrounded by children. He is sometimes conflated with Caishen, the Chinese god of wealth.

=== Luxing ===
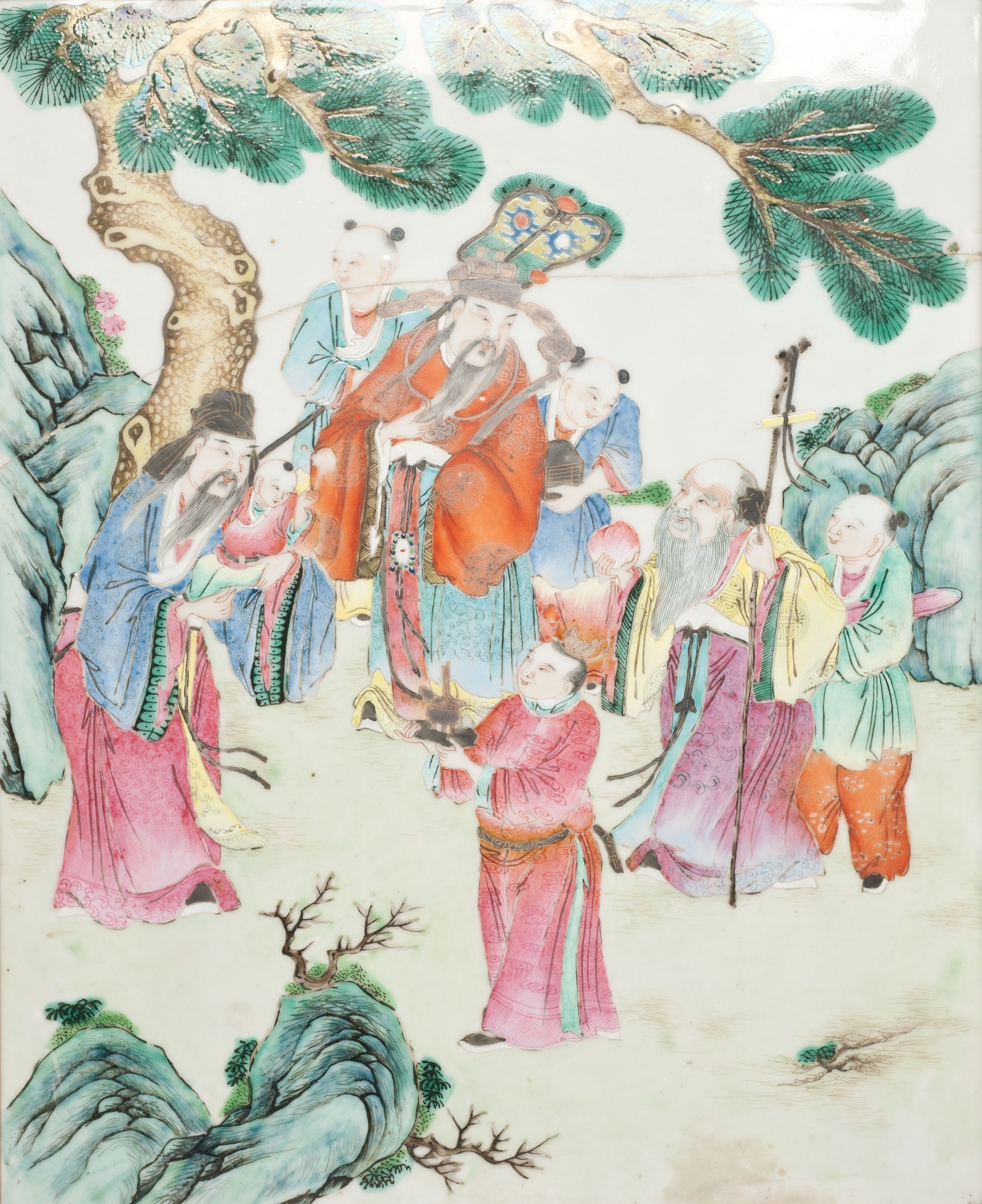
Painted porcelain depicting the three gods: Fu, Lu and Shou, originating from China from the Qianlong period, Spoelberch Collection, KU Leuven

The star of Lu (祿), or Luxing (Chinese: 祿星; pinyin: lùxīng), corresponds to Mizar (ζ Ursae Majoris), or in traditional Chinese astronomy, the sixth star in the Wenchang constellation (文昌六). Like the star of Fortune, it also came to be personified, and is believed to be Zhang Xian who lived during the Later Shu dynasty. The character "Lu" specifically refers to the salary of a government official. As such, the star of Lu is considered the deity of prosperity, rank, and influence. He is often depicted holding a ruyi sceptre.

The star of Lu is also worshipped separately from the other two as the deity dictating one's success in the imperial examinations, and therefore success in the imperial bureaucracy. The star of Lu is usually depicted in the dress of a mandarin.

=== Shouxing ===
The star of Shou, or Shouxing (Chinese: 壽星; pinyin: Shòuxing; lit. 'Star of longevity'), corresponds to the star α Carinae (Canopus). Other names include Sau and Old Man of the South Pole. It is also called the "star of the south pole" in Chinese astronomy, and is believed to control the lifespans of mortals. According to legend, he was carried in his mother's womb for ten years before being born, and was already an old man when delivered. He is recognized by his high, domed forehead and the peach which he carries as a symbol of immortality. The longevity god is usually shown smiling and friendly, and he may sometimes be carrying a calabash gourd filled with the elixir of life. He is sometimes conflated with Master Lao and immortals in Taoist theology.

== Gallery ==
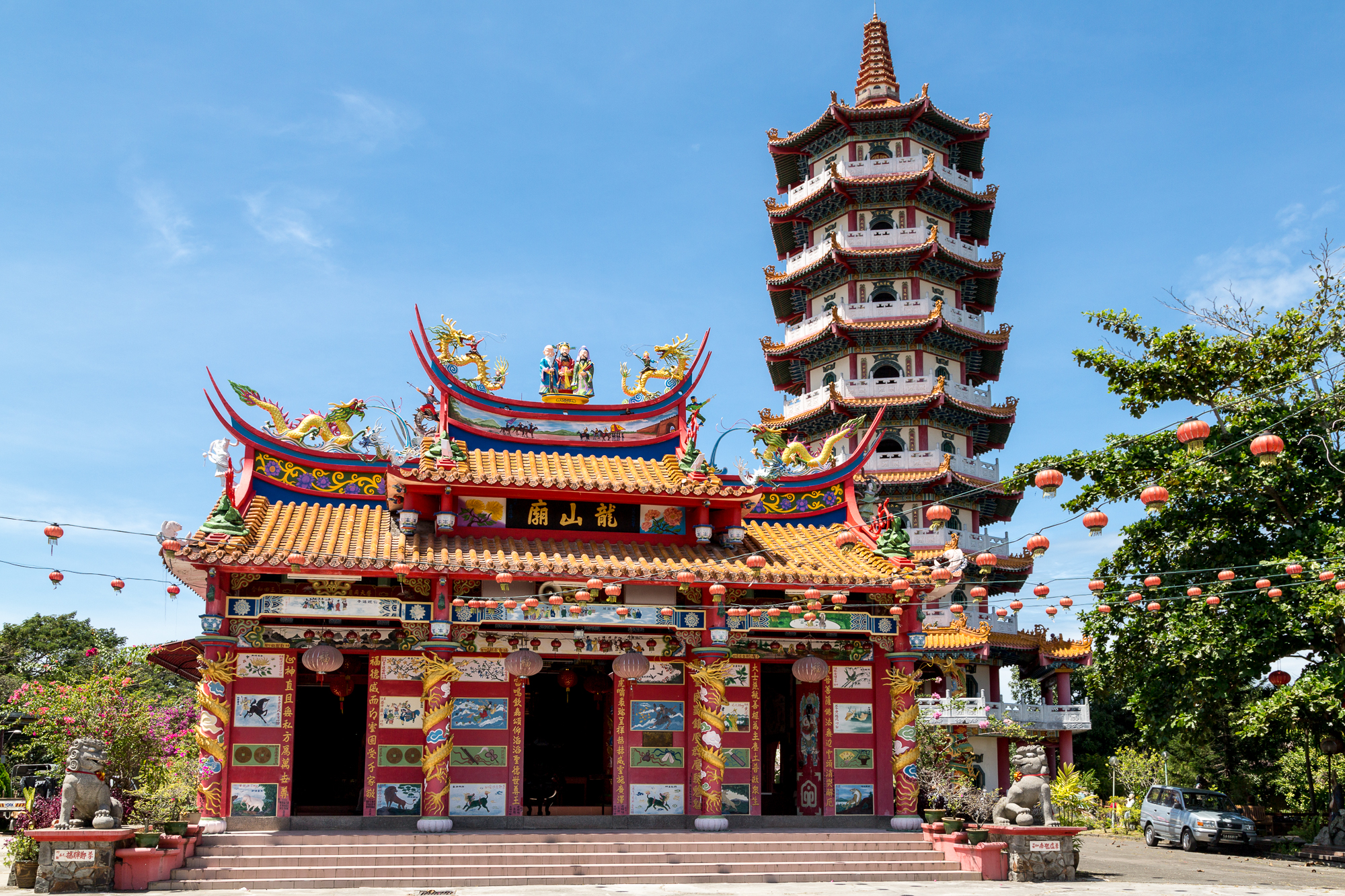
Fu, Lu and Shou statues on the roof of Ling San Temple, a Chinese folk religion's temple in Tuaran, Sabah, Malaysia

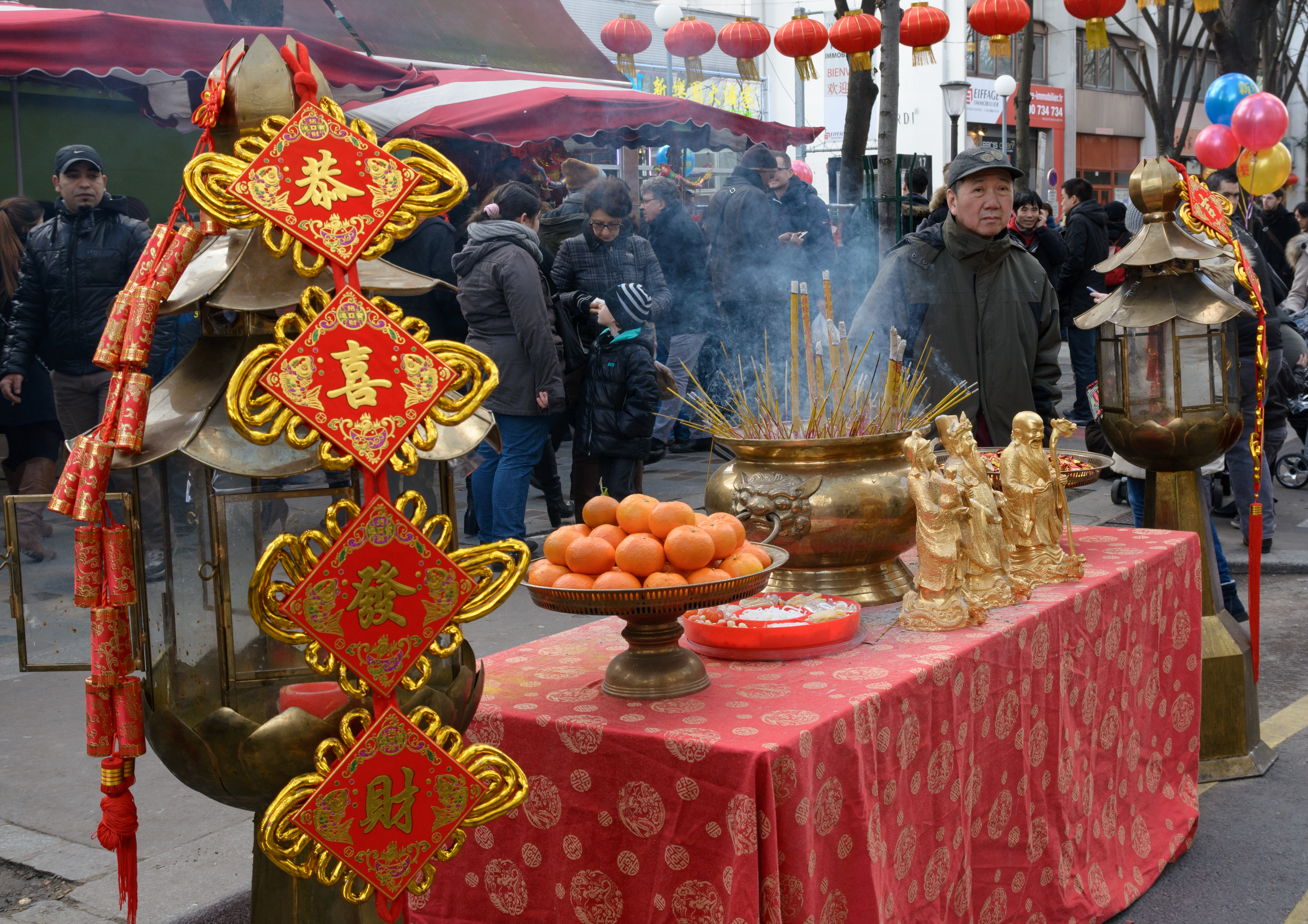
A street altar with Fu, Lu and Shou statues during Chinese New Year 2015 in Paris, France

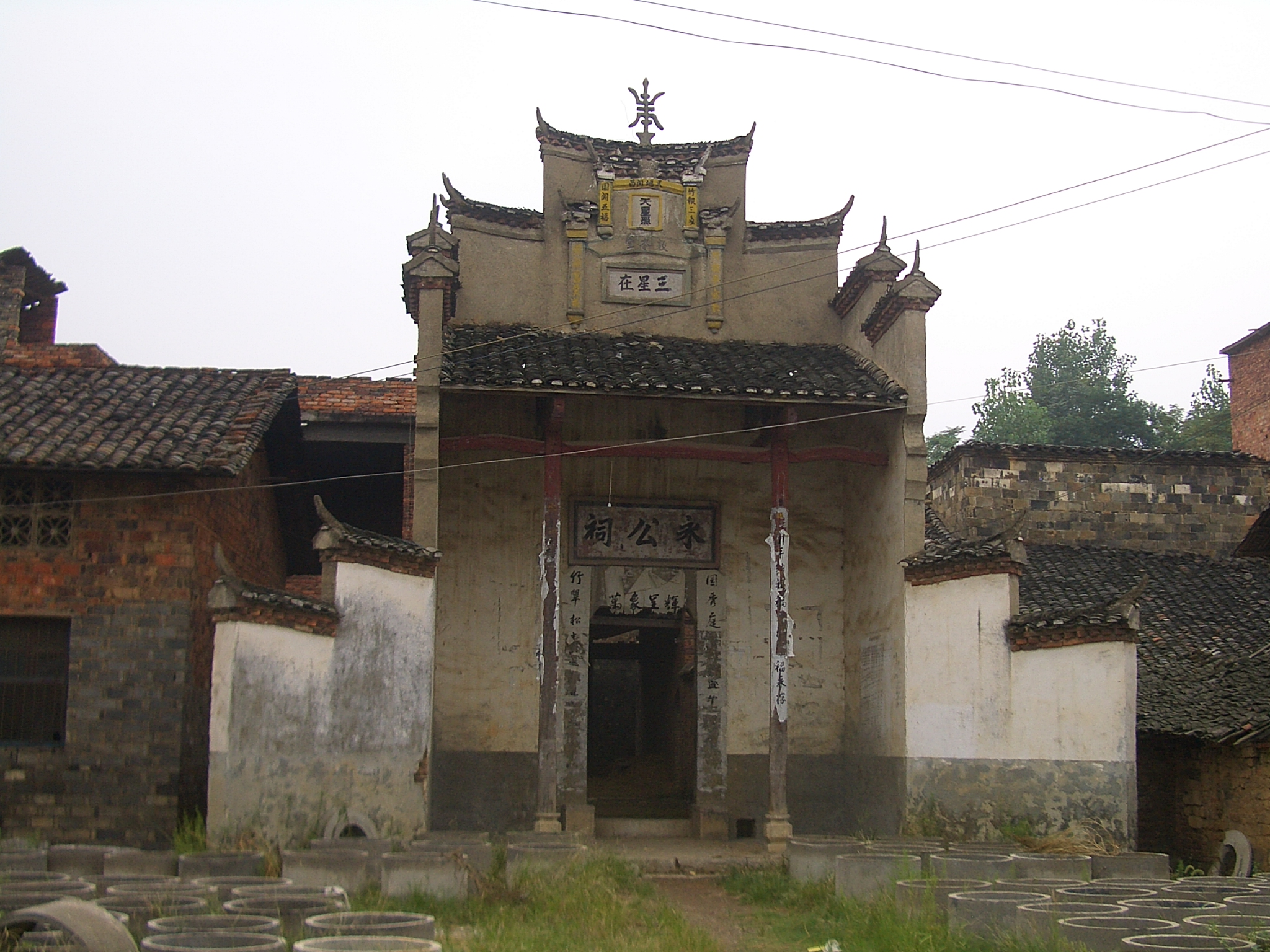
This shrine to a Master Yong in a Yangxin County village, Hubei features a tablet, high in the facade, saying "The Three Stars are Present". The symbol at the top of the facade is a stylised derivation of the character shou, "longevity"

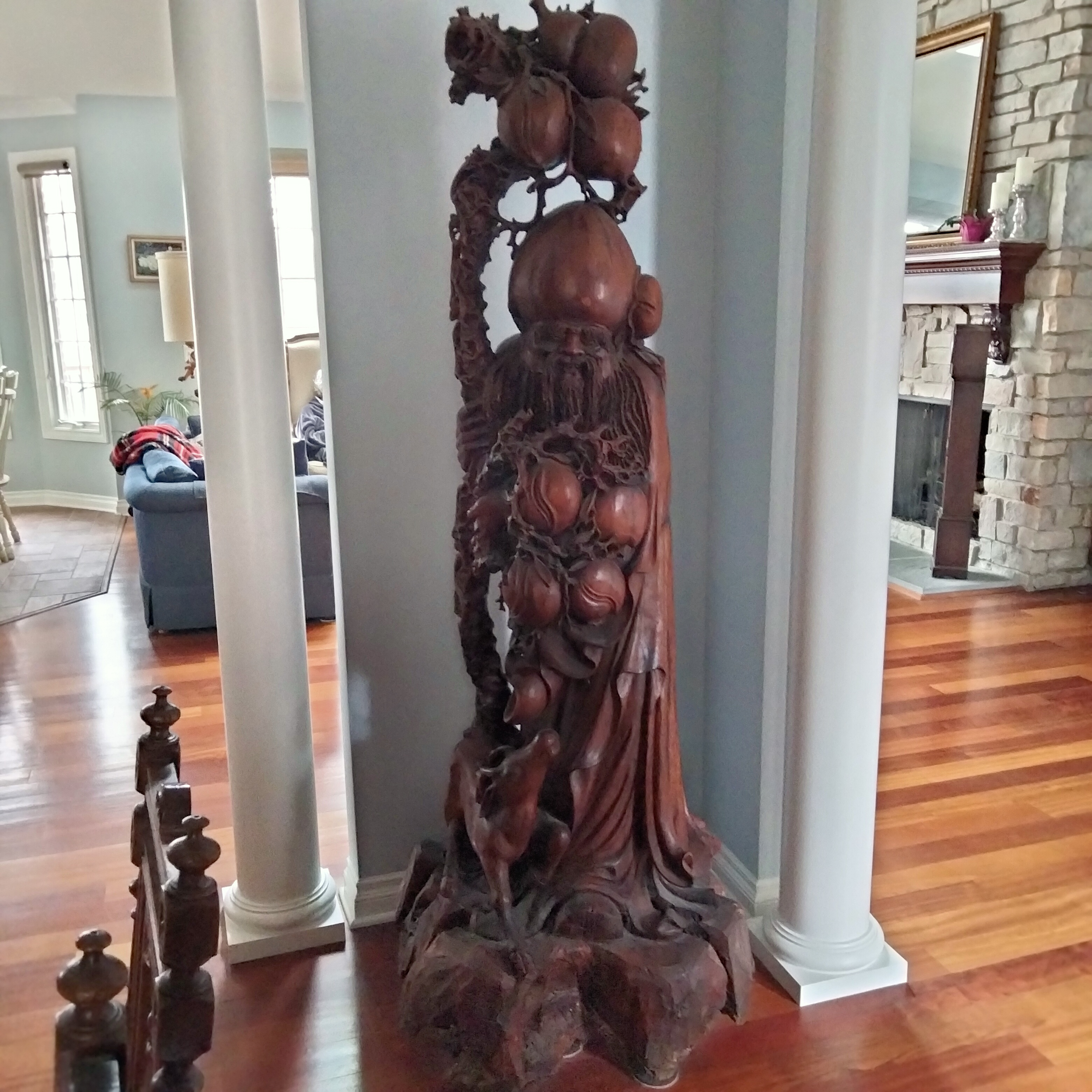
Life-size wooden carving of Shou in private home

== See also ==
- Fukurokuju, Japanese god derived from "Shou" deity of Sanxing
- He-He Er Xian (和合二仙), Immortals of Harmony and Union, associated with happy marriages
- Seven Lucky Gods, similar group of Japanese auspicious deities
- Tai Sui (太歲)—60 Heavenly Officials who will be in charge of each year during the Chinese sixty-year cycle
- Wufang Shangdi
  - Color in Chinese culture
- Xi (喜), a character sometimes added to form the set phrase: Fu Lu Shou Xi
- Sữa Ông Thọ, a brand of condensed milk in which uses Shou as a mascot for the brand
- Asian Garden Mall, the first and largest Vietnamese-American shopping mall known as Phước Lộc Thọ in Vietnamese, sharing the Vietnamese name for the Sanxing

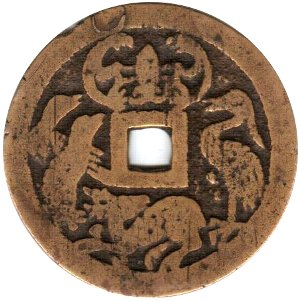
Qing Dynasty (1644–1911) Fu Lu Shou Xi coin.

== Sources ==
- Needham, Joseph; Wang, Ling (1995) [1959]. Science and Civilisation in China: Volume 3, Mathematics and the Sciences of the Heavens and the Earth. Cambridge, England: Cambridge University Press. p. 30. ISBN 978-0-521-05801-8.
- Stevens, Keith G. (2001). Chinese Mythological Gods. Images of Asia. Oxford University Press. ISBN 978-0-19-591990-5.
- Stepanchuk, Carol; Wong, Charles (1991). Mooncakes and Hungry Ghosts: Festivals of China. San Francisco: China Books & Periodicals. ISBN 0-8351-2481-9.
- Seow, Jeffrey (1999). Fu Lu Shou: Gods of Blessings, Prosperity and Longevity. Singapore.
- Yang, Lihui; An, Deming (2005). Handbook of Chinese Mythology. ABC-CLIO. ISBN 978-1-57607-806-8.
