= Benten-dō =

Buddhist temple in Japan

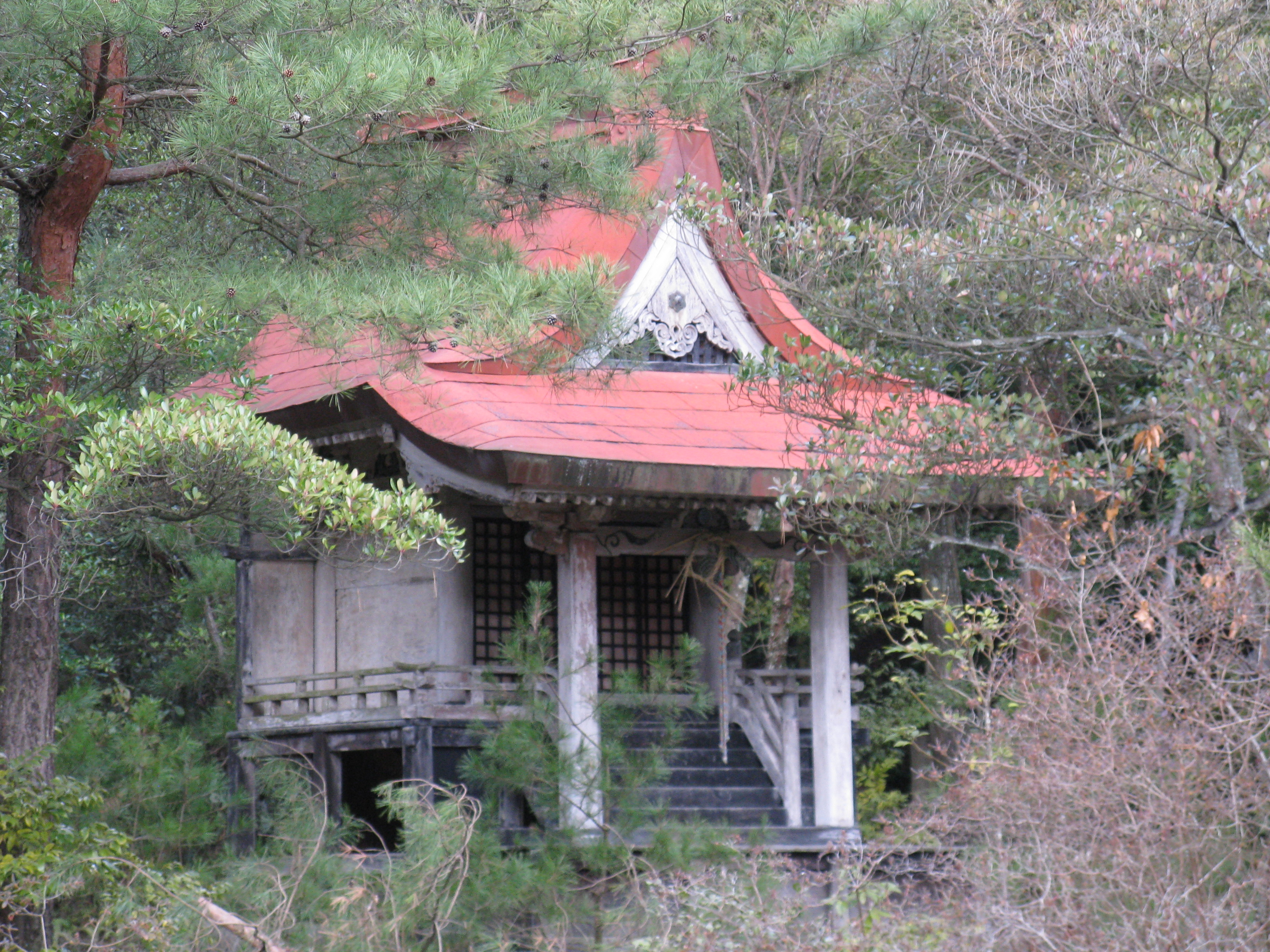
An example of Benten-dō

A Benten-dō (弁天堂, lit. hall of Benten) is a Buddhist temple dedicated to Benten or Benzaiten, goddess of wealth, happiness, wisdom, and music. Many such temples exist all over Japan.

Because the goddess was originally the personification of a river, Benten-dō often stand next to some source of water, a river, pond, spring, or even the sea. The goddess is routinely believed to be essentially the same as kami Ugajin within the syncretism of Buddhism and local kami worship called shinbutsu-shūgō. For this reason, Benten-dō can be found also at many Shinto shrines, despite use of the suffix -dō, which is the traditional designation for a Buddhist "hall". In contrast, the halls of Shinto shrines use the esuffix -den, as in honden. An example of the syncretic association is the Kawahara Shrine in Nagoya.
