= Benzaiten =

Japanese Buddhist goddess

- Goddess of all that flows: water, music, arts, love, wisdom, wealth, fortune
- Member of the Seven Lucky Gods
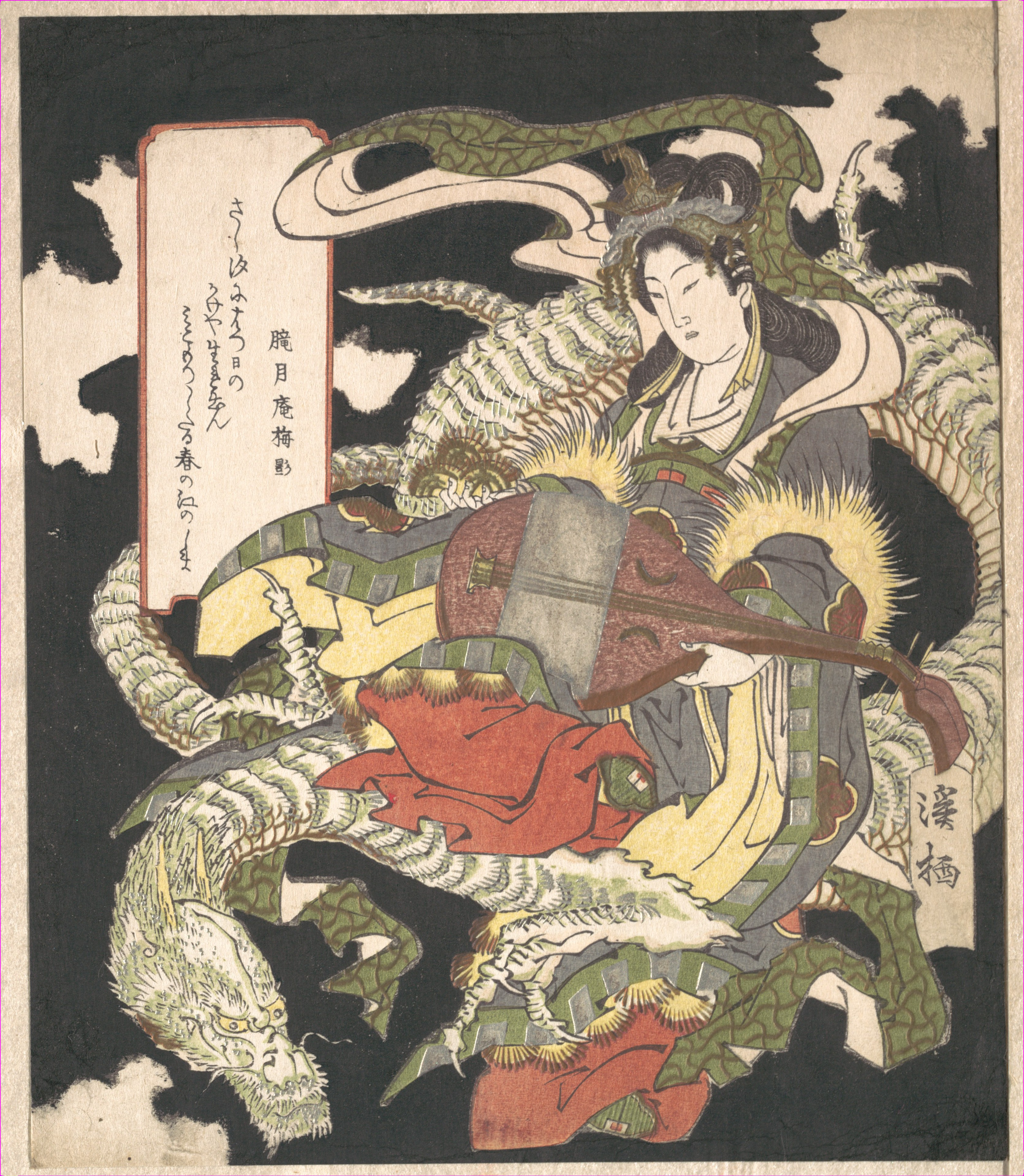
- Benzaiten with a lute (biwa) seated on a white dragon
- Other names: Benzaitennyo (弁才天女); Daibenzaiten (大弁才天); Benten (弁天); Myōonten (妙音天); Bionten (美音天); Sarasabakutei (薩羅婆縛底); Sarasabattei (薩羅薩伐底); Sarasantei (薩羅酸底)
- Japanese: 弁才天, 弁財天 (shinjitai) 辯才天, 辨才天, 辨財天 (kyūjitai)
- Affiliation: Deva; Gadgadasvara Bodhisattva (assumed traits of); Kisshōten (assumed traits of); Ichikishimahime (conflated with); Ugajin (conflated with)
- Mantra: Oṃ Sarasvatyai svāhā (On Sorasobateiei sowaka)
- Animals: snake, dragon
- Symbols: lute (biwa), sword, cintāmaṇi
- Consort: None; Daikokuten (some traditions)

Benzaiten (弁才天／弁財天; Japanese pronunciation: [bè̞ń.d͡zä́ì.tè̞ɴ̀, bé̞ń-]), (Note: Kyūjitai: 辯才天, 辨才天, or 辨財天. This name is a literal Chinese translation of Saraswati, meaning "goddess of eloquence", used in Buddhist scriptures.) or simply Benten (弁天; [bè̞ń.té̞ɴ́, -té̞ɴ̀, bé̞ń-]), is an East Asian Buddhist dharmapāla who has been adopted into Mahayana from Hindu goddess Saraswati, the patroness of speech, the arts, and learning.

Worship of Benzaiten arrived in Japan during the sixth to eighth centuries, mainly via Classical Chinese translations of the Golden Light Sutra (Sanskrit: Suvarṇaprabhāsa Sūtra), which has a section devoted to her. Benzaiten was also syncretized with Japanese kami and adopted into the Shinto religion, with several Shinto shrines dedicated to her. As such, she is now also associated with dragons, snakes, many local deities, wealth, fortune, protection from disease and danger, and the protection of the state.

== Indian deity ==
Saraswati by Raja Ravi Varma

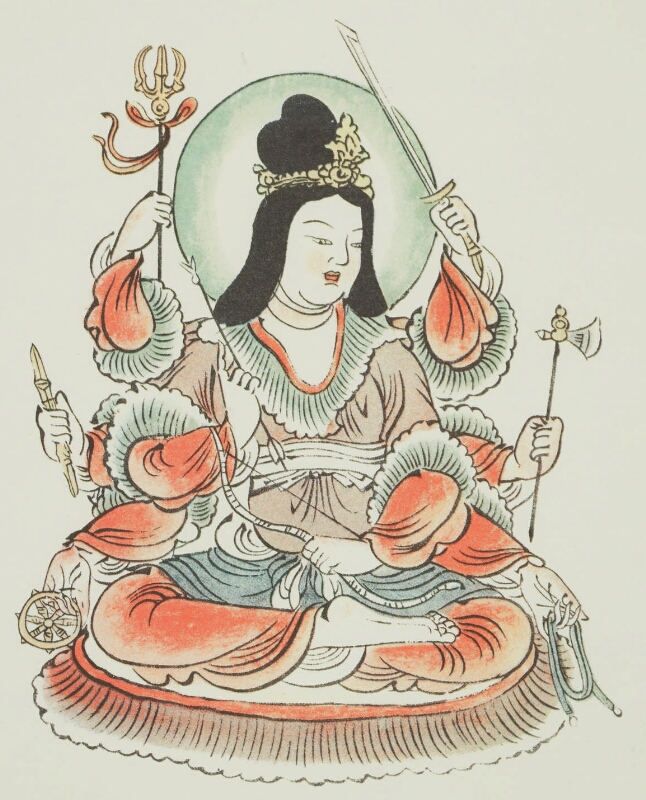
Benzaiten with eight arms holding a bow, an arrow, a sword, a spear, an axe, a single-pronged vajra, a wheel, and a noose

Saraswati (Sanskrit: Sarasvatī; Pali: Sarassatī) was originally a river goddess in the Rigveda, as the deification of the Sarasvati River. She may be identified with Vach (Skt. Vāc), the Vedic goddess of speech, and from there became considered to be the patron of music and the arts, knowledge, and learning.

In addition to their association with eloquence and speech, both Saraswati and Vach also show warrior traits: Saraswati may be called the "Vritra-slayer" (Vṛtraghnī) in the Rigveda (6.61.7) and was associated with the Maruts. She was also associated with the Ashvins, with whom she collaborates to bolster Indra's strength by telling him how to kill the asura Namuchi. In a hymn in Book 10 of the Rigveda (10.125.6), Vach declares: "I bend the bow for Rudra that his arrow may strike and slay the hater of devotion. I rouse and order battle for the people, and I have penetrated Earth and Heaven."

Saraswati, featured into Buddhism, featuring mainly in Mahayana texts. In the 15th chapter of Yijing's translation of the Sutra of Golden Light (Suvarṇaprabhāsa Sūtra) into Classical Chinese (Taishō Tripitaka 885), Saraswati (大辯才天女, pinyin: Dàbiàncáitiānnǚ; Japanese: Daibenzaitennyo, lit. "great goddess of eloquence") appears before the Buddha's assembly and vows to protect all those who put their faith in, recite, or copy the sutra. In addition, she promises to increase the intelligence of those who recite the sutra so that they will be able to understand and remember various dharanis.

She then teaches the assembly various mantras with which one can heal all illnesses and escape all manner of misfortune. One of the Buddha's disciples, the brahmin Kaundinya, then praises Saraswati, comparing her to Vishnu's consort Narayani (Lakshmi) and declaring that she can manifest herself not only as a benevolent deity, but also as Yami, the sister of Yama. He then describes her eight-armed form with all its attributes — bow, arrow, sword, spear, axe, vajra, iron wheel, and noose.

The poem describes Saraswati as one who "has sovereignty in the world", as one who is "good fortune, success, and peace of mind". It also states that she fights in battlefields and is always victorious.

One key concern of the Golden Light Sutra is the protection of the state, and as such, Saraswati here also takes on some form of a warrior goddess, similar to Durga. Bernard Faure notes that Vach already had martial attributes, which may have been retained in some form.

== Bencaitian/Benzaiten ==
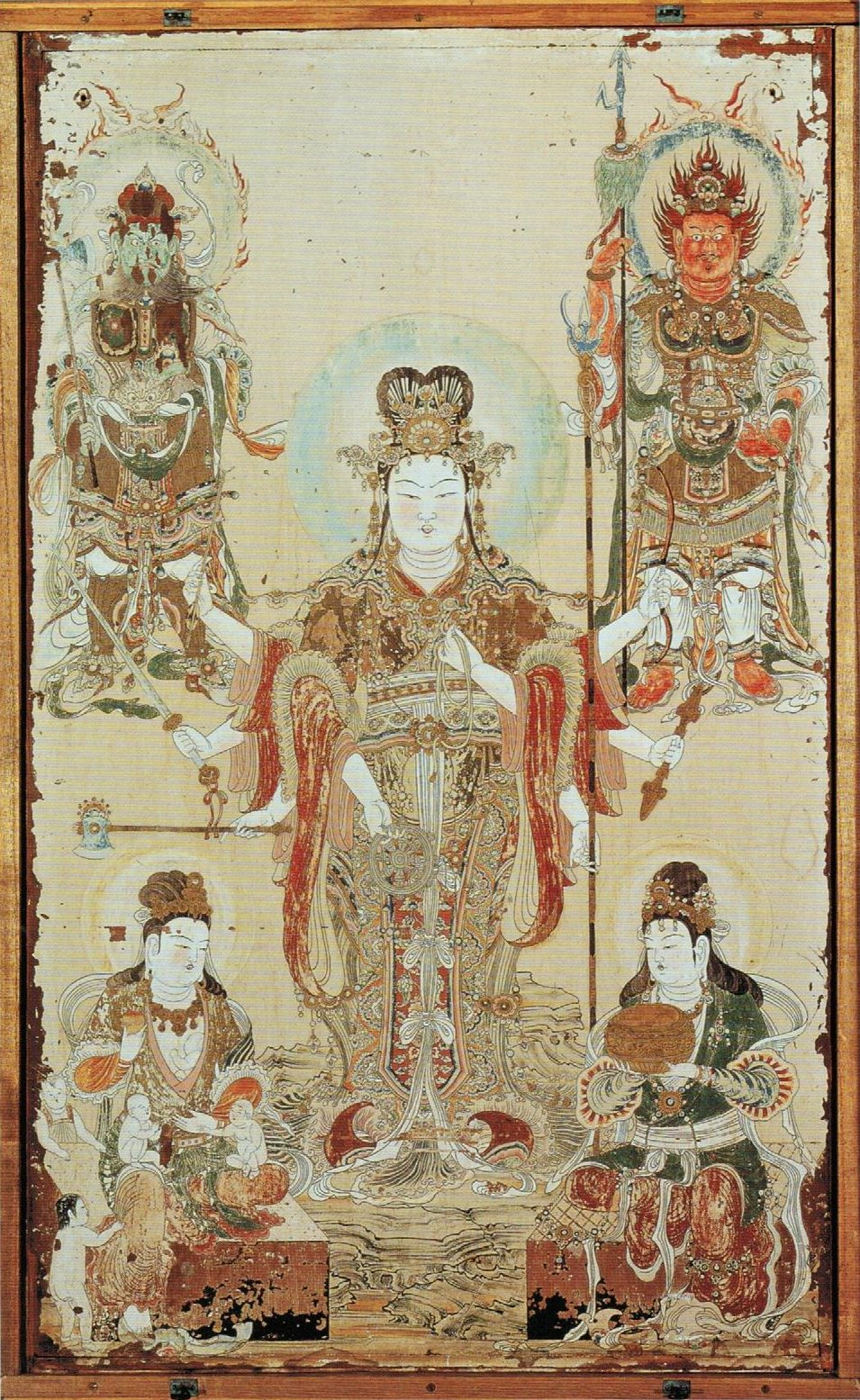
Eight-armed Benzaiten surrounded by the goddesses Kariteimo (Hariti) and Kenrōchijin (Prithvi) and two divine generals (c. 1212)

“Saraswati” was borrowed into Chinese as “辯才天” (Bencaitian) or "great eloquence deity" (大辯天). This was then subsequently borrowed into Japanese as “弁財天” (Benzaiten). In East Asian Buddhism, she is one of the Twenty-Four Protective Deities (Chinese: 二十四諸天; pinyin: Èrshísì Zhūtiān). She remained associated with wealth, music, and eloquence, and additionally began to be viewed as a fierce protector of the state (due to the influence of the Golden Light Sutra which promises to protect a country where the sutra is chanted).

During the medieval period onwards, Benzaiten came to be associated and sometimes conflated with a number of Buddhist and local deities, including the goddess Kisshōten, whose role as goddess of fortune eventually became ascribed to Benzaiten in popular belief. As such, she was eventually also worshiped as a bestower of monetary fortune and became part of the set of popular deities known as the Seven Lucky Gods (shichifukujin).

Benzaiten is depicted in various fashions in Japanese art. She is often shown holding a biwa, similar to how Saraswati is often depicted with a veena in Indian art, though she may also be portrayed wielding a sword and a wish-granting jewel (cintāmaṇi). An iconographic formula showing Benzaiten with eight arms holding a variety of weapons (based on the Golden Light Sutra) is believed to derive from Durga's iconography. As Uga Benzaiten, she may also be shown with Ugajin (a human-headed white snake) above her head. She may be portrayed (albeit rarely) with the head of a snake or a dragon.

Benzaiten's worship spread to Taiwan during the Japanese colonial period, and she is still venerated in certain locations, such as the Xian Dong Yan temple in Keelung City.

=== Esotericism ===
In Japanese Buddhism, Benzaiten also developed various esoteric aspects. In the Tendai school's Keiran shūyō shū (渓嵐拾葉 集; lit. “Collection of Leaves Gathered in Tempestuous Brooks”), a fourteenth century compendium, Benzaiten is associated with the three truths and the three contemplations in one thought, as well as various esoteric seed syllables, which represent the ultimate principle of enlightenment.

=== Syncretism with Shinto kami ===
Due to her status as a water deity, Benzaiten was linked with nāgas, dragons, and snakes. Over time, she became identified with Ichikishima-hime-no-mikoto (市杵島姫命), who is one of three kami believed to be daughters of the sun goddess Amaterasu.

She is also believed by Tendai Buddhists to be the essence of the kami Ugajin, whose effigy she sometimes carries on her head together with a torii. Consequently, she is sometimes known as Uga (宇賀) Benzaiten or Uga Benten.

=== Bīja and mantra ===
सु (su), Benzaiten's seed syllable (bīja) in Siddhaṃ script

The bīja (or seed syllable) used to represent Benzaiten in Japanese esoteric Buddhism is su (सु, traditionally read in Japanese as so), written in Siddhaṃ script.

In Japanese esoteric Buddhism (mikkyo), Benzaiten's main mantra is as follows:

Sanskrit	Sino-Japanese pronunciation	Hiragana
Oṃ Sarasvatyai svāhā	On Sarasabatei-ei Sowaka	おん さらさばていえい そわか

== Temples and shrines ==
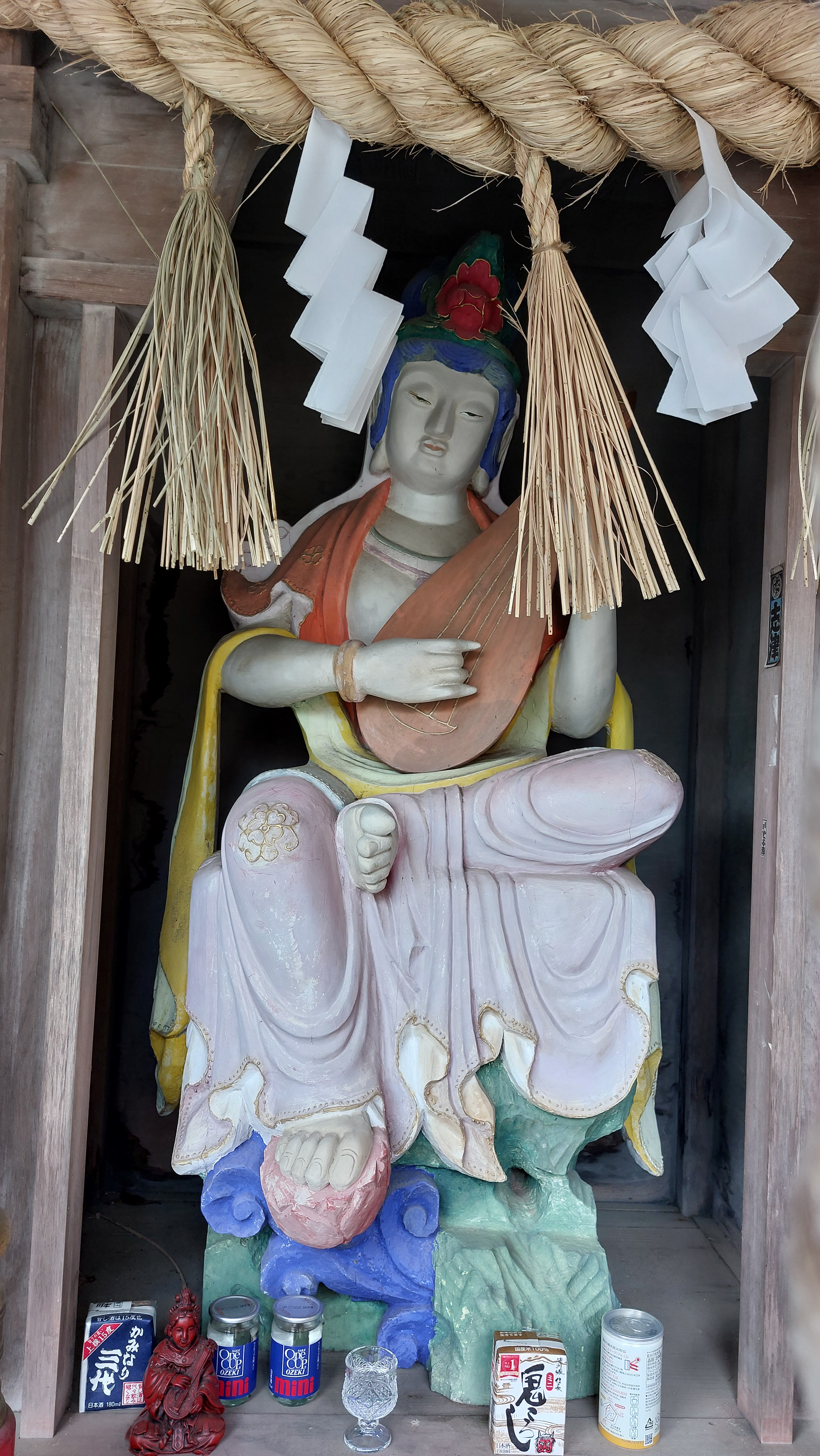
Benzaiten statue, Chikubu Island, Lake Biwa

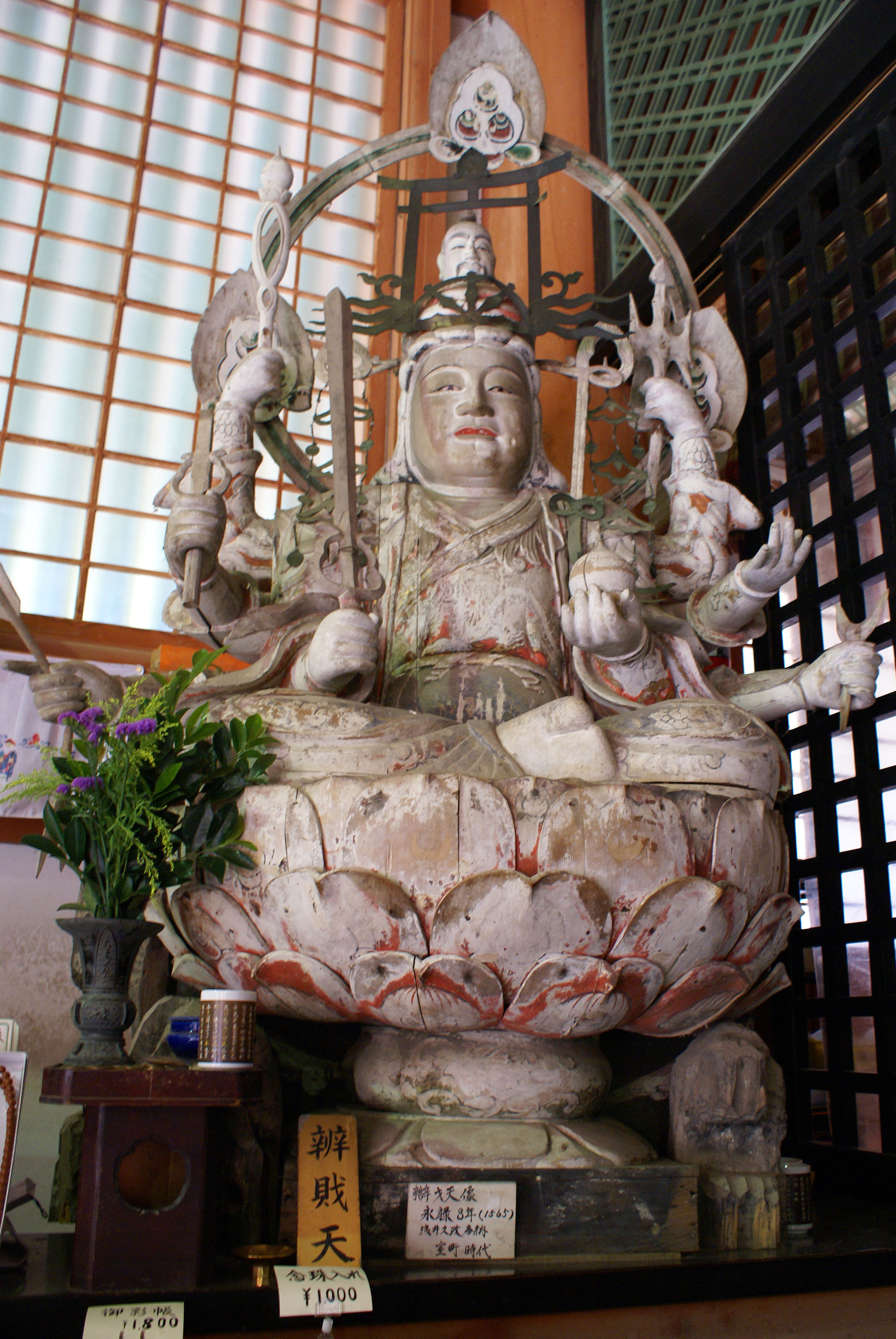
Eight armed Uga Benzaiten, Hogonji

In Japan, the places of worship dedicated to Benzaiten are often called "辯天堂" (benten-dō) or benten-sha (弁天社). Shinto shrines dedicated to her are also called by this name. Entire Shinto shrines can be dedicated to her, as in the case of Kamakura's Zeniarai Benzaiten Ugafuku Shrine or Nagoya's Kawahara Shrine. Benzaiten temples or shrines places are commonly located near bodies of water such as rivers, ponds, or springs, due to her association with water.

Benzaiten is enshrined on numerous locations throughout Japan, including: Enoshima Island in Sagami Bay, Chikubu Island in Lake Biwa, and Itsukushima Island in Seto Inland Sea. She and a five-headed dragon are the central figures of the Enoshima Engi, a history of the shrines on Enoshima written by the Japanese Buddhist monk Kōkei (皇慶) in 1047. According to Kōkei, Benzaiten is the third daughter of the dragon-king of Munetsuchi (無熱池; lit. "lake without heat"), known in Sanskrit as Anavatapta, the lake lying at the center of the world according to Buddhist cosmology.

Ryōhō-ji, also known as the "Moe Temple", enshrines Benzaiten. It is known for anime-style depictions of Buddhist deities.

=== Benzaiten Buddhist temples ===
- Hogon-ji Temple (Nagahama City, Shiga Prefecture, Chikubushima, Japan's Three Major Benzaiten)
- Daigan-ji Temple (Hyokkaichi City, Hiroshima Prefecture, Miyajima, Japan's three major Benzaiten)
- Yaotomi Shrine (Gamagori City, Aichi Prefecture, Takeshima (Aichi Prefecture), Japan Shichibenten)
- Enkyo-ji Temple (Himeji City, Hyogo Prefecture, on the day of Kishi every 60 days Uga Benzai Tenyu Shuku is practiced)
- Takian-ji Temple (Mino City, Osaka Prefecture)
- Shinju-ji Temple (Nishinomiya City, Hyogo Prefecture)
- Shinfuku-ji Temple (Tsuyama City, Okayama Prefecture)
- Tokai-ji Temple Fuse Benten (Kashiwa City, Chiba Prefecture)
- Senso-ji Temple Bentenzan (Taito Ward, Tokyo) [11]
- Kanei-ji Temple Shinobazu Pond Benzaiten (Taito Ward, Tokyo, Edo Shichibenten)
- Myoko-ji Temple Itsukushima Bensaiten (Ueda City, Nagano Prefecture, Kamehime-sama's dedication)
- Togo-ji Temple (Nagoya City, Aichi Prefecture)
- Kofuku-ji Temple Kubo Benzaiten (Nara City, Nara Prefecture, in the three-storied pagoda, hidden Buddha)
- Ryozen-ji Temple Daibensai Tendo (Nara City, Nara Prefecture)
- Chokenji Temple (Fushimi Ward, Kyoto City)
- Fukasawa Zenarai Benten (Tonosawa, Hakone-cho, Ashigashimo-gun, Kanagawa Prefecture)
- Saifuku-ji Temple (Kagoshima City, Kagoshima Prefecture, Japan's largest wooden Buddha)
- Ikko-ji Temple Benten Cave (Inagi City, Tokyo)
- Daisei-ji Temple Inokashira Benzaiten (Mitaka City, Tokyo)
- Honko-ji Temple, Suse Benzai Kotoku Tenjo (Ichikawa City, Chiba Prefecture)
- Hase-dera Bentendo Benten Cave (Kamakura City, Kanagawa Prefecture)
- Kaiko-ji Temple, Izumiyama Yutsu Benzaiten (Yamauchi of Senwakuji Temple, Higashiyama Ward, Kyoto City, Kyoto Prefecture, Hachibi statue with Denkyo Daishi Saicho Saku, Hidden Buddha)
- Ryōhō-ji Temple Shingo Benzaiten (Hachioji City, Tokyo, dating from 1489, known as "Moe-ji Temple" for its use of anime style depictions of Buddhist deities)
- Momo-ji Temple Naked Benzaiten (2-16 Yotsuya-dori, Chikusa-ku, Nagoya City)
- There is a shrine on a floating island protruding in Tanara-numa, Onrin-ji Temple (Oura-cho, Gunma Prefecture).
- Eian-ji Temple (Kanazawa City, Ishikawa Prefecture) Enshrined in Bentendo where vermilion Hiten dances with Bishamonten and Daikokuten (opened several times a year)
- Myoen-ji Temple Iwaya Reijo Tsuchiya Zeni Benten (Hiratsuka City, Kanagawa Prefecture)
- Jushoin Matsumoto Benten (Edogawa-ku, Tokyo)
- Hoju-in Kaiun Suzusato-saiten (Minato-ku, Tokyo)
- Meio-ji Temple (Ibaraki City, Osaka Prefecture, Benten sect headquarters)
- Nyoi-ji Temple (the head temple of the Benten sect in Gojo City, Nara Prefecture, Gyoki Bodhisattva is said to have been carved in the Nara period)

=== Shinto shrines enshrining Benzaiten ===
- Enoshima Shrine (Fujisawa City, Kanagawa Prefecture, Enoshima, Japan's three major Benzaiten)
- Koami Shrine (Nihonbashi, Tokyo)
- Zeniarai Benzaiten Ugafuku Shrine (Kamakura City, Kanagawa Prefecture)
- Shimizu Benzaitensha (Saku City, Nagano Prefecture)
- Tenkawa Daibenzaitensha (Tenkawa-mura, Yoshino-gun, Nara Prefecture, Japan's three major Benzaiten) [Note 6]
- Koganeyama Shrine (Ishinomaki City, Miyagi Prefecture, Mt. Kinka)

Benzaiten is also enshrined as Ichikishima Hime-no-Mikoto at the Munakata Taisha shrine.

== See also ==
- Buddhist Tenbu (天部) deities
- Daikokuten
- Dakini
- Hinduism in Japan
- Seven Lucky Gods
- Shinbutsu-shūgō
- Three Great Shrines of Benzaiten
- Tenjin (kami)
- Vaiśravaṇa
- Anahita

== Bibliography ==
- Faure, Bernard (2015). Protectors and Predators: Gods of Medieval Japan, Volume 2. University of Hawaii Press. ISBN 978-0824857721.
- Kinsley, David (1998). Hindu Goddesses: Visions of the Divine Feminine in the Hindu Religious Tradition. Motilal Banarsidass Publishers. ISBN 978-8-1208-0394-7.
- Ludvik, Catherine (2004). "A Harivaṃśa Hymn in Yijing's Chinese Translation of the Sutra of Golden Light". Journal of the American Oriental Society. 124 (4): 707–734. doi:10.2307/4132114. JSTOR 4132114.
- Ludvik, Catherine (2007). Sarasvatī: Riverine Goddess of Knowledge. From the Manuscript-carrying Vīṇā-player to the Weapon-wielding Defender of the Dharma. Brill. ISBN 978-9-0474-2036-1.
