= Ryōhō-ji =

Buddhist temple in western Tokyo, Japan

Ryōhō-ji 了法寺
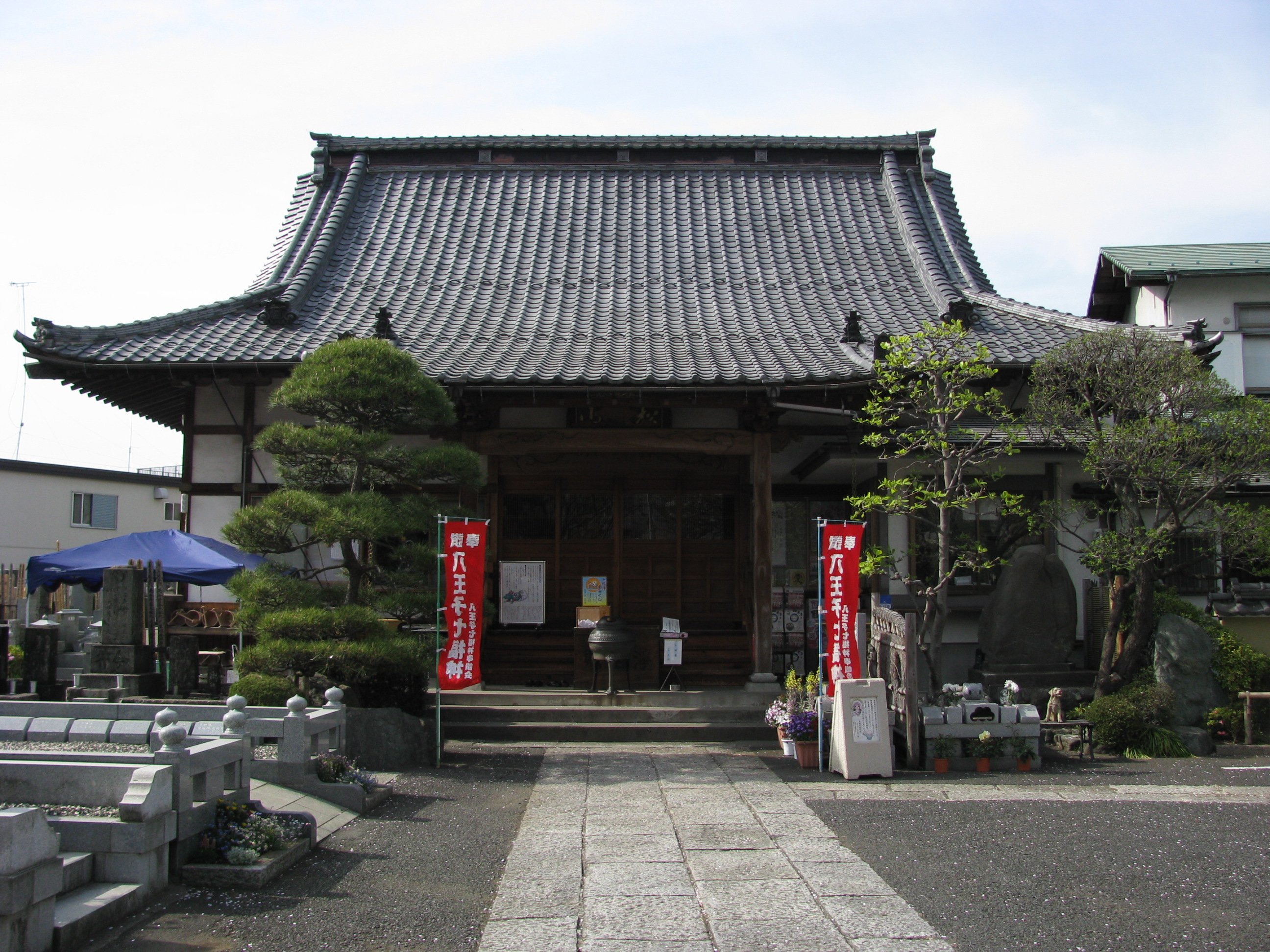
- Ryōhō-ji main hall

- Ryōhō-ji Ryōhō-ji (Japan)

Religion
- Affiliation: Buddhism
- Deity: Lotus Mandala
- Rite: Nichiren-shū

Location
- Location: 2-1 Hiyoshi-chō, Hachiōji, Tōkyō
- Country: Japan
- Interactive map of Ryōhō-ji 了法寺
- Coordinates: 35°39′38.1″N 139°18′58.3″E

Architecture
- Founder: Keiun Nicchō
- Completed: 1489

Website
- Official website

Ryōhō-ji (了法寺) is a Buddhist temple affiliated with Nichiren-shū located in the city of Hachiōji in western Tōkyō, Japan. Its mountain name is Shōei-zan (松栄山).

The temple is among those of the Hachiōji Shichifukujin Pilgrimage (八王子七福神めぐり), and enshrines the goddess Benzaiten. It is popularly known as Moe-ji (萌え寺). It was formerly associated with Honkoku-ji (本圀寺) of the Rokujōmon-ryū (六条門流) branch of Nichiren Buddhism.

== History ==
- 1489 - The temple was established by Keiun Nicchō (啓運日澄) for his retirement.
- 1490 - Establishment formerly recognized within Hachiōji.
- 1590 - Relocated to Hiyoshi-chō

== Temple grounds ==
- Main Hall
- Cemetery
- Inari Hall (稲荷堂, Inari-dō)
- Ema shelf (絵馬掛, Ema-kake)
- Picture guide (案内看板, Annai-kaban), popularly known as Moe-kaban (萌え看板)

== Faith tradition ==
As is customary of Shinbutsu-shūgō tradition, Shinto kami are also enshrined at Ryōhō-ji such as Ugajin, an agricultural deity closely associated with the Buddhist deity Benzaiten. Inari Ōkami and Ukanomitama are both enshrined within the Inari Hall.

The temple has also enshrined Daikokuten and Ryūjin in an effort to expand its popularity.

== Moe-ji ==
In May 2009, the temple installed an illustrated signboard featuring Buddhist and Shinto deities as anime characters, prompting the popular name Moe-ji (萌え寺). In order to provide a cheerful atmosphere for visitors, the enshrined Shingo Benzaiten (新護弁財天), an eccentric, stylized form of the goddess, is presented through various forms of music and entertainment. The temple abbot was introduced to voice actress and illustrator Toromi, who went on to play the role of Benzaiten in cosplay, taking on the persona "Toro Benten."

August 2010 saw the release of a theme song for Ryōhō-ji, Tera zukkyun! Ai no Ryōhō-ji! (寺ズッキュン!愛の了法寺!), under the Ryōhō-j Records label created by music ensemble IOSYS.

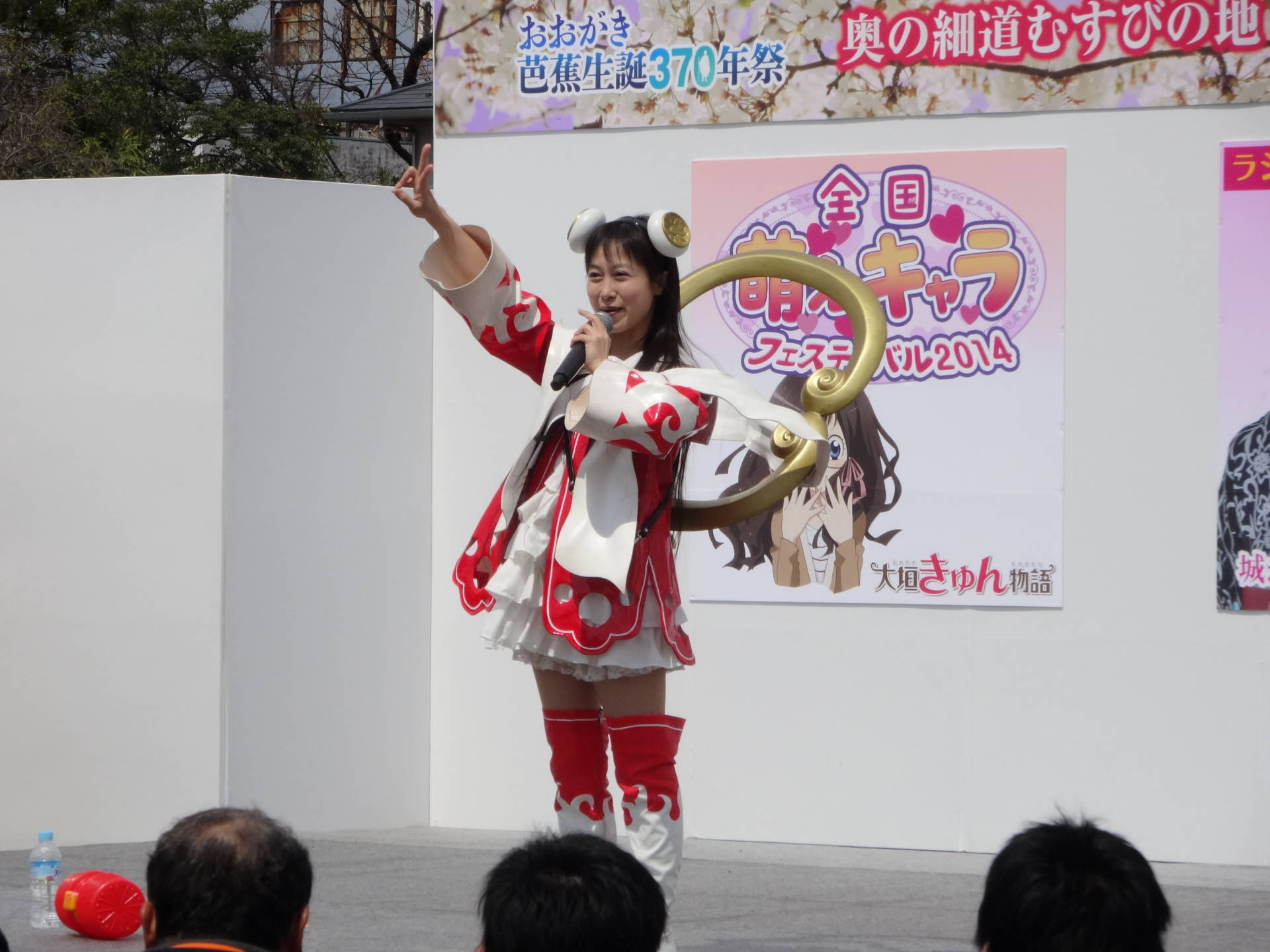
Toromi cosplaying as Benzaiten and singing
