= Kawahara Shrine =

Shinto shrine in Aichi Prefecture, Japan

Kawahara Shrine (川原神社, Kawahara-jinja)
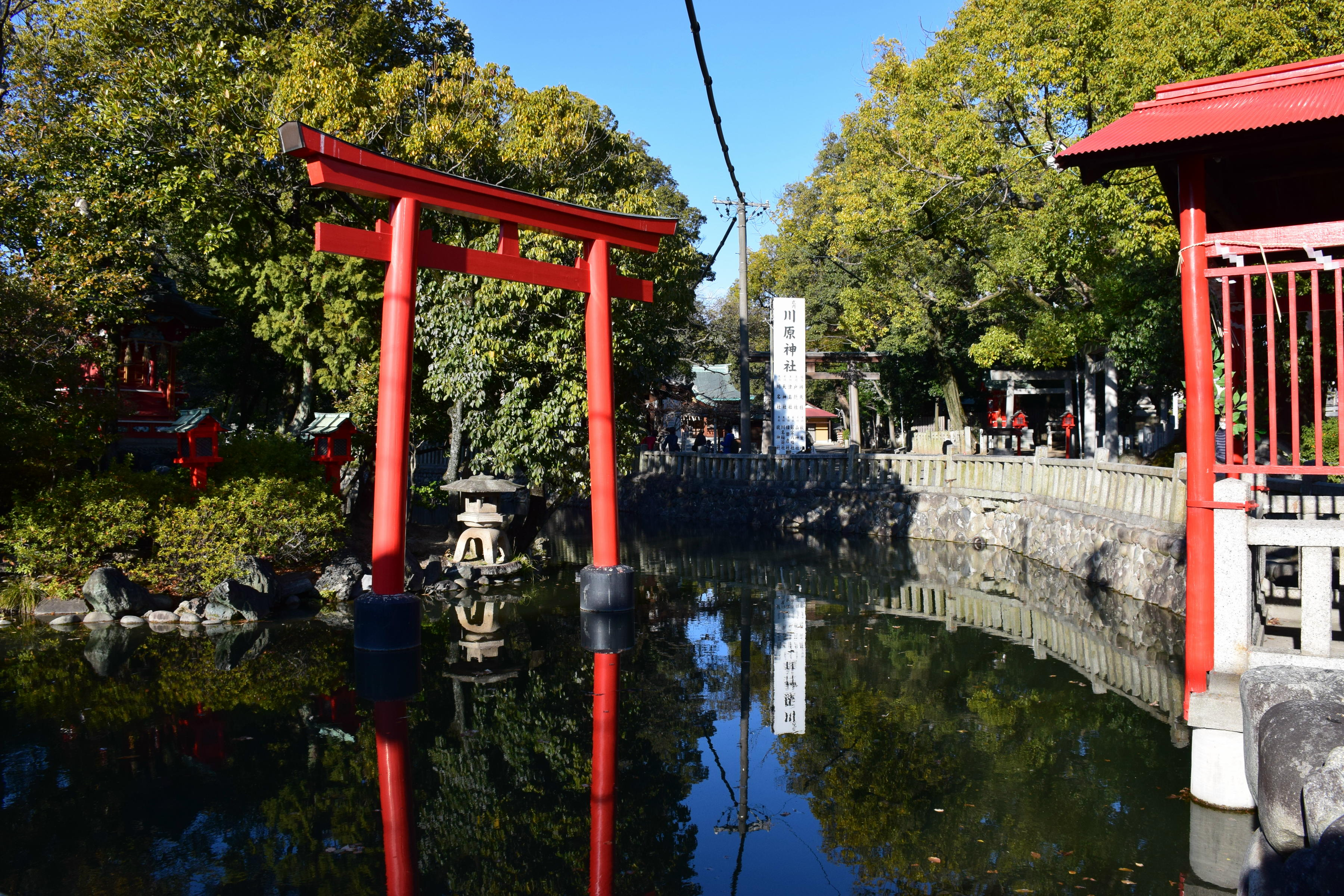
- Kawahara Shrine

- Location within Japan

Religion
- Affiliation: Shinto

Location
- Location: Shōwa-ku, Nagoya, Aichi Prefecture, Japan
- Coordinates: 35°9′4.5″N 136°56′38.9″E

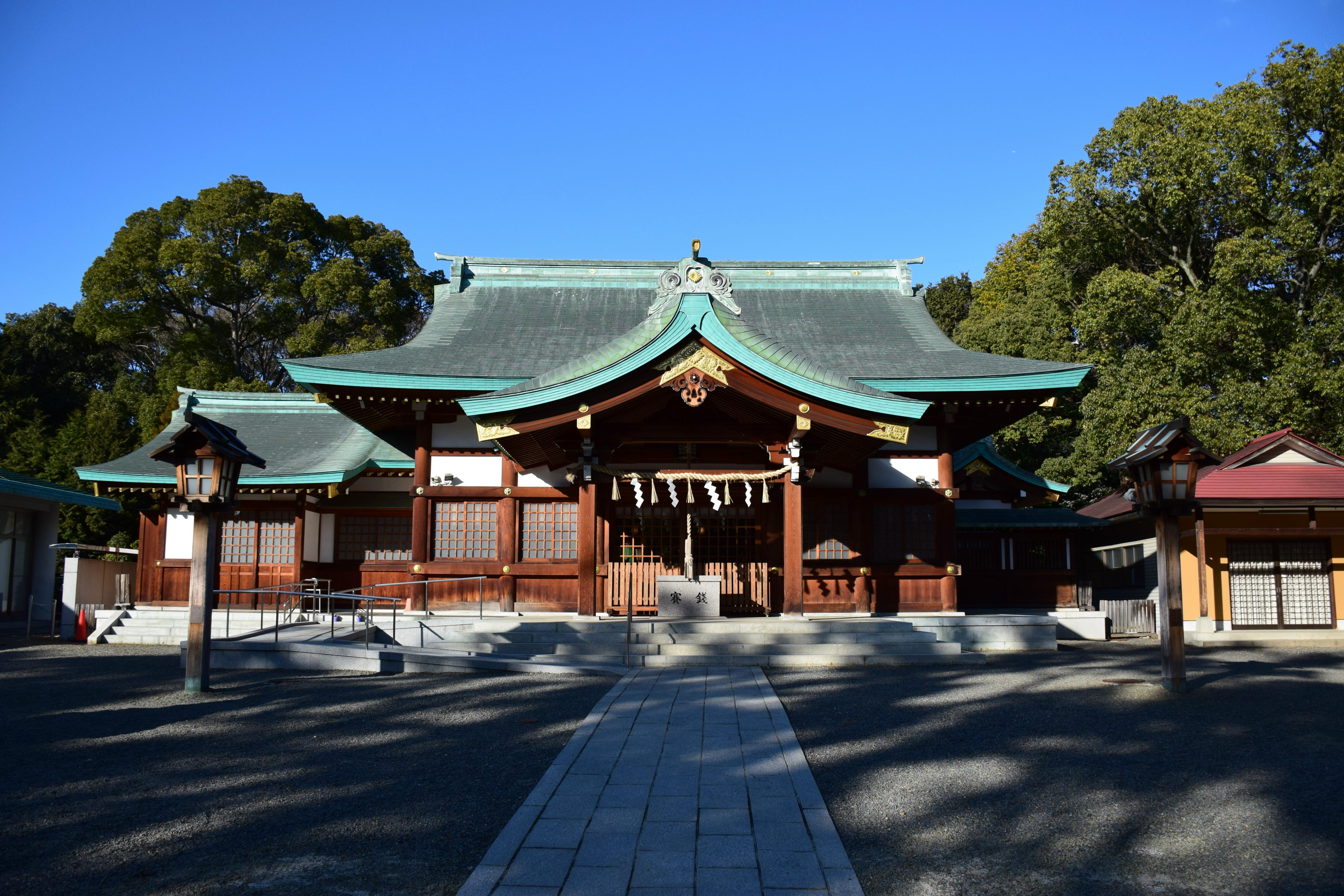
Haiden main hall

The Kawahara Shrine (川原神社, Kawahara-jinja), or the Benten of Kawana, is a Shinto shrine and Buddhist Benten-dō located in Shōwa-ku, Nagoya, Aichi Prefecture, Japan. Its name means "riverbank", referring to its historic location in an area of farmland near the Yamazaki River. Its primary deity is the goddess Izanami.

== History ==
The local farmers constructed a Shinto shrine to honor a sacred spring during the mid-Heian period, around 1030 CE. Its name means "riverbank", referring to its historic location in an area of farmland near the Yamazaki River. Reflecting its community, the shrine's focus was water and agriculture. Travelers on the Minoji Road used the shrine as a guardian deity during the Edo period.

In the 20th century, the farmland around the shrine transitioned into urban Nagoya; the shrine, along with the spring and a grove of camphor trees, has survived as a green area in the city. Its camphor trees are more than 400 years old.

== Religion ==
Kawahara Shrine is devoted to Shinto. The shrine's primary deity is the goddess Izanami, who provides life-giving water in addition to giving birth to the islands of Japan. The shrine is also devoted to Mizuhanome, the goddess of water and irrigation. A serpent deity, Ugajin, is also honored at the shrine for its association with water and the harvest. Through these three deities, the Kawahara Shrine is a "guardian of water, fertility, and the sustaining forces of nature."

Since Buddhism and Shinto were closely intertwined, the shrine was also dedicated to Benzaiten. Therefore, it is also known as the "Benten of Kawana".

== Architecture ==
Kawahara Shrine is in the Nagare-zukuri style. Its main building features a curved roof that provides shelter for the offering area. The site includes the wooden Sacred Spring Pavilion, built over the sacred spring that runs under its main hall.The shrine was renovated in 1998.

== Location ==
Kawahara Shrine is located in Shōwa-ku, Nagoya, Aichi Prefecture, Japan. The nearest Nagoya Municipal Bus stop is "Bentenmae" on the No. 18.
