= Kita-Kashiwa Station =

Railway station in Kashiwa, Chiba Prefecture, Japan

JL29 Kita-Kashiwa Station 北柏駅
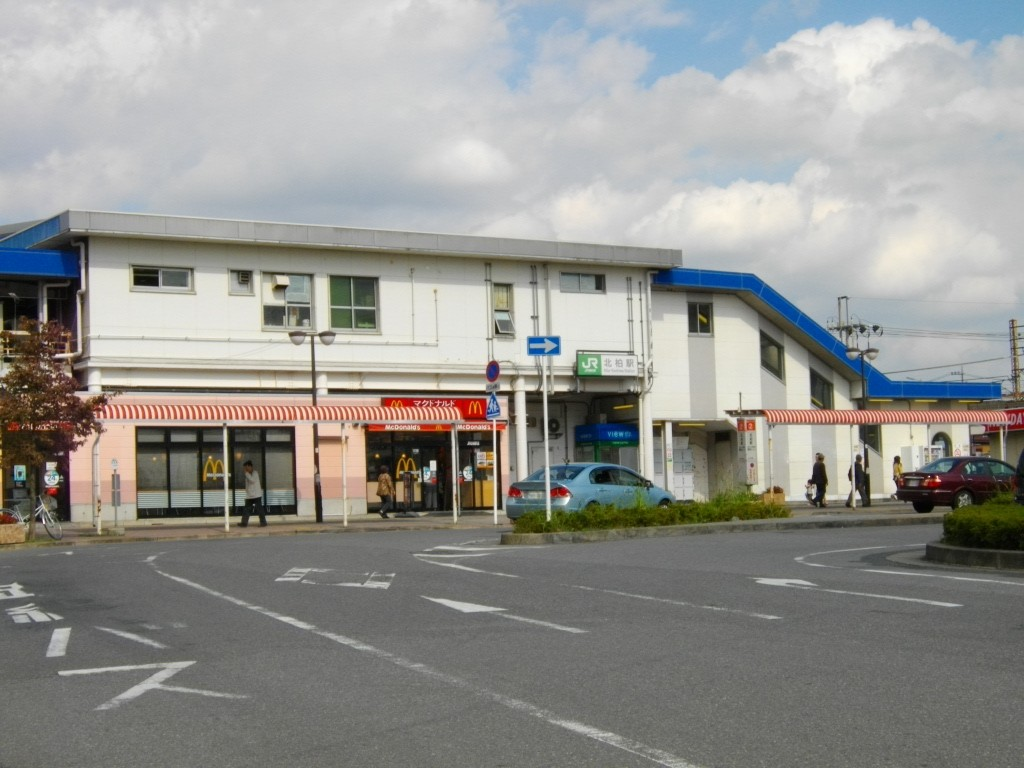
- Kita-Kashiwa Station in October 2009

General information
- Location: 1901 Neto, Kashiwa-shi, Chiba-ken 277-0831; Japan
- Coordinates: 35.8757°N 139.9881°E
- Operator: JR East
- Line: Jōban Line (Local)
- Distance: 29.2 km from Nippori
- Platforms: 1 island platform

Other information
- Status: Staffed
- Station code: JL29
- Website: Official website

History
- Opened: April 10, 1970

Passengers
- FY2019: 19,140 daily

Services
Preceding station	JR East	Following station
Kashiwa JL28 towards Ayase	Jōban Line (Local) Local-Kankō	Abiko JL30 towards Toride
Location
- Location within Chiba Prefecture Location within Japan

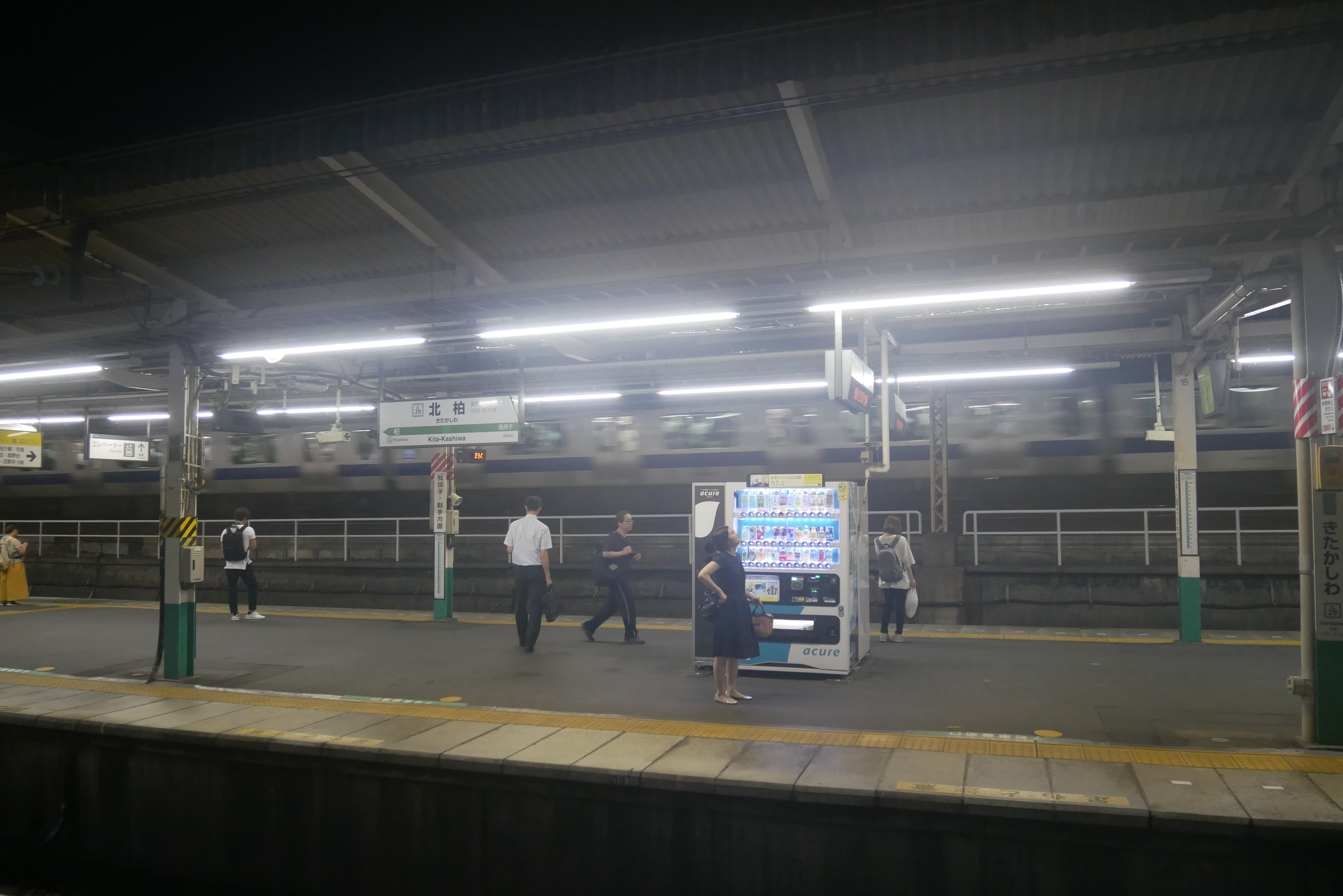
Platforms, 2019

Kita-Kashiwa Station (北柏駅, Kitakashiwa-eki) is a passenger railway station in the city of Kashiwa, Chiba, Japan, operated by East Japan Railway Company (JR East).

== Lines ==
Kita-Kashiwa Station is served by the Jōban Line from Ueno in Tokyo and is 29.2 km from the terminus of the line at Nippori Station in Tokyo.

== Station layout ==
The station is composed of a single island platform serving two tracks, with an elevated station building. The station is staffed.

=== Platforms ===
1	Jōban Line (Local)	for Abiko and Toride
2	Jōban Line (Local)	for Kashiwa, and Matsudo, Ayase; Tokyo Metro Chiyoda Line for Kita-senju, Nishi-nippori and Yoyogi-uehara

== History ==
Kita-Kashiwa Station was opened on 10 April 1970 as a freight station on the Japan National Railways (JNR). The station opened for passenger traffic on April 20, 1972. Kita-Kashiwa Station was absorbed into the JR East network upon the privatization of the JNR on 1 April 1987.

== Passenger statistics ==
In fiscal 2019, the station was used by an average of 19,140 passengers daily.

== Surrounding area ==
- National Route 6
- Tōkai-ji

== See also ==
- List of railway stations in Japan
