= Kōkei (monk) =

Japanese Buddhist monk

Kōkei (also Kogei; 皇慶: 977?–1049), the author of the Enoshima Engi, was an eminent Japanese Buddhist monk. He is said to have commenced his career as a monk at the age of seven, when he climbed Mt. Hiei to Enryakuji Monastery, one of the centers of Japanese Buddhism.

Kōkei is credited with the building of the Enryuji (円隆寺) Temple in Tango (丹後; ancient name for region to the north of Kyoto on the Sea of Japan) during the period 995–998. In the year 1003 AD, he boarded a vessel in an attempt to travel to Song dynasty China to study Buddhism, however, the vessel was unable to depart, and he gave up that ambition. Around 1026, he left Enryakuji and built a thatched hermitage in the Tanba region north of Kyoto at Ikegami (池上). It is said to have been the predecessor of the Ikegami-in (池上院) sub-temple. In reference to this hermitage, he was also known as "Ikegami Ajari" (池上阿闍梨: "The Master-teacher of Ikegami"). He remained at Ikegami until he received a dream sent by the guardian deity of Enryakuji, who commanded him to return to Enryakuji. He died in Enryakuji at the age of seventy-seven (or seventy-three according to other sources).

As the seventh generation disciple in a direct line from Ennin (圓仁), he was a learned monk who played an important role in the rise of the Tendai sect. The Enoshima Engi, which he completed two years before his death, presented the goddess Benzaiten both as a protector of the state (in keeping with the Sutra of Golden Light) and as a savior of the people, thus expanding her role. He is also the author of Zuiyoki (随要記), a treatise on a consecration ceremony in which water is sprinkled on the head of a disciple by a master, thereby upgrading the disciple's status.

He is considered the founder of the Tani school of Taimitsu.
