= Zeniarai Benzaiten Ugafuku Shrine =

Shinto shrine in Kanagawa Prefecture, Japan

Zeniarai Benzaiten Ugafuku Jinja
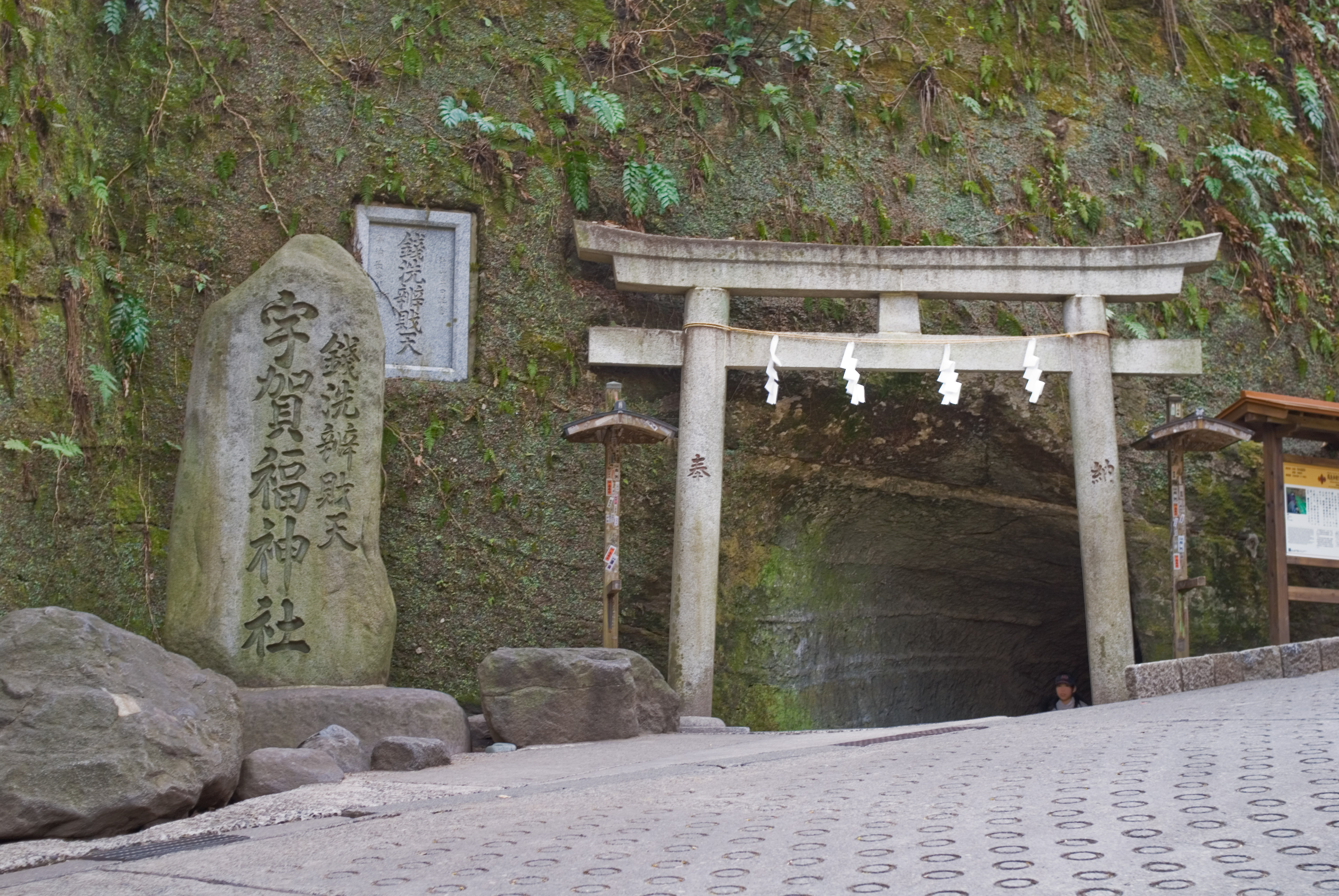
- Zeniarai Benzaiten Shrine

- Location within Japan

Religion
- Affiliation: Shinto
- Deity: Ugafukujin, or goddess Benzaiten

Location
- Location: Kamakura, Kanagawa Prefecture, Japan
- Interactive map of Zeniarai Benzaiten Ugafuku Jinja
- Coordinates: 35°19′32.93″N 139°32′32.10″E

Architecture
- Founder: Minamoto no Yoritomo
- Established: Circa 1185

Zeniarai Benzaiten Ugafuku Shrine (銭洗弁財天宇賀福神社, Zeniarai Benzaiten Ugafuku Jinja), popularly known as Zeniarai Benten, is a Shinto shrine in Kamakura, Kanagawa Prefecture, Japan. It is a small shrine, but the second most popular spot in Kamakura after Tsurugaoka Hachimangū. Zeniarai Benzaiten is popular among tourists because the waters of a spring in its cave are said to be able to multiply the money washed in it. The object of worship is a syncretic kami that fuses a traditional spirit called Ugafukujin (宇賀福神) with the Buddhist goddess of Indian origin Sarasvati, known in Japanese as Benzaiten. The shrine is one of the minority in Japan that still shows the fusion of native religious beliefs and foreign Buddhism (the so-called shinbutsu shūgō), which was normal before the Meiji restoration (end of the 19th century). Zeniarai Benzaiten used to be an external massha of Ōgigayatsu's (Note: The ending "ヶ谷", common in Japanese place names and usually read "-gaya", in Kamakura is normally pronounced "-gayatsu", as in Shakadōgayatsu, Ōgigayatsu, and Matsubagayatsu.) Yazaka Daijin (八坂大神), but became independent in 1970 under its present name.

== History and features ==
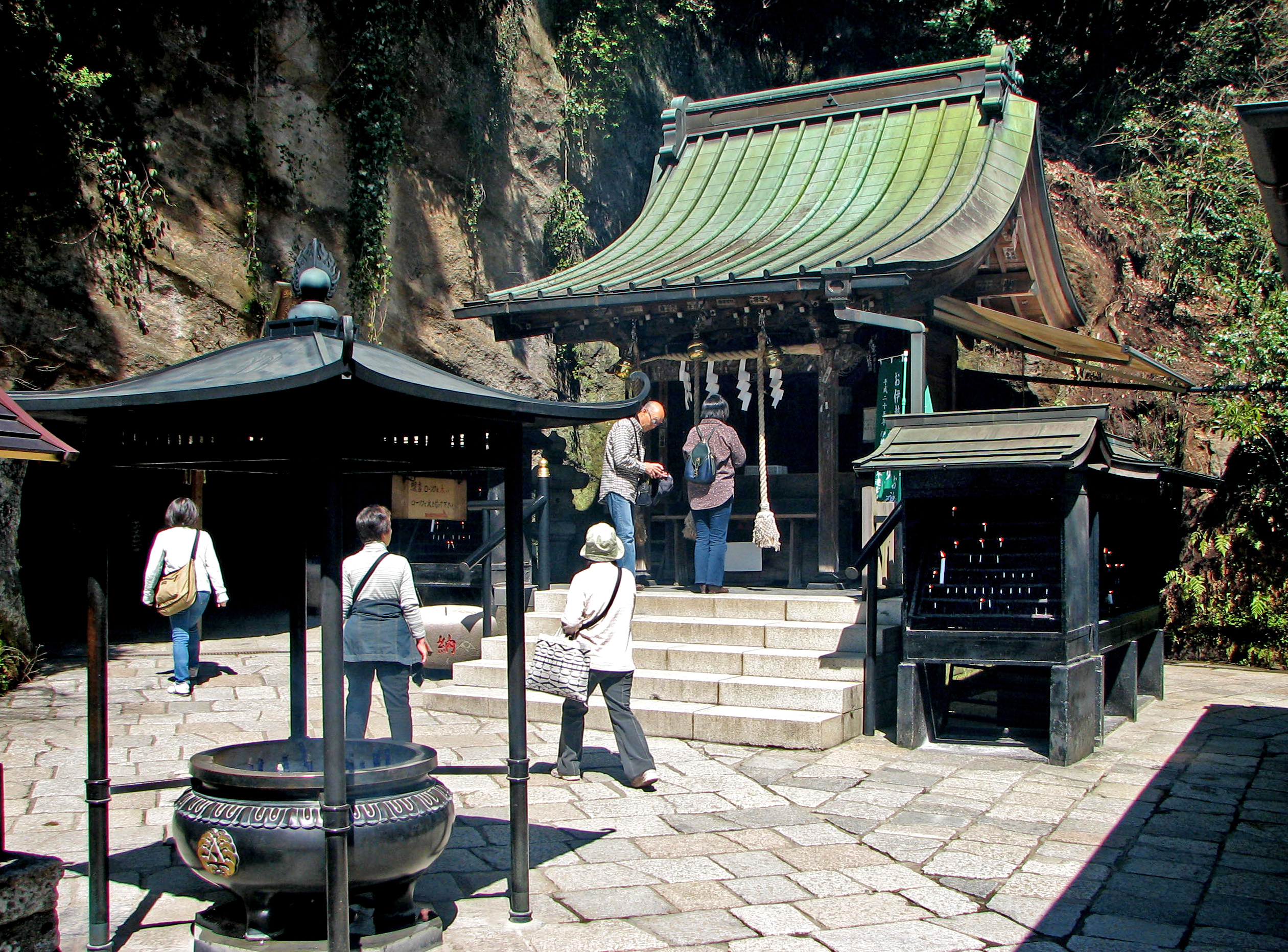
Zeniarai Benten's interior

According to the sign at the entrance, Zeniarai Benzaiten was founded in 1185 (Bunji 1) after Minamoto no Yoritomo (1147–1199), first of the Kamakura shōguns, on the day of the Snake in the month of the Snake (Note: The Snake, besides being an animal associated with Ugafukujin, is one of the symbols of the Chinese zodiac, which is based on the Chinese lunar calendar. Because the Japanese used a lunar calendar, this date does not correspond to a specific month and day of the Gregorian calendar, and its exact identification depends entirely on the year. For details, see the article Sexagenary cycle.) dreamed of kami Ugafukujin. The kami told him that "In a valley to the northwest, there is a miraculous spring that gushes out of the rocks. Go there and worship (Shinto) kami and (Buddhist) hotoke, and peace will come to the country. I am the kami of this land, Ugakufujin." Yoritomo reportedly found the spring and built a shrine for Ugafukujin, a kami whose symbol is a snake with a human head.

In reality, however, while the existence since that time of the spring and of the tradition linked to it is certain, that of the shrine is not. Edo period topographical documents attest that the area from where Zeniarai's water springs was called kakurezato (隠里, hidden country), but does not mention the shrine. Analogously, the Kōkoku Chishi (皇国地誌, empire topography), a Meiji period topological survey, mention one but not the other, and it is likely therefore that the shrine was built sometime in the late 19th century.

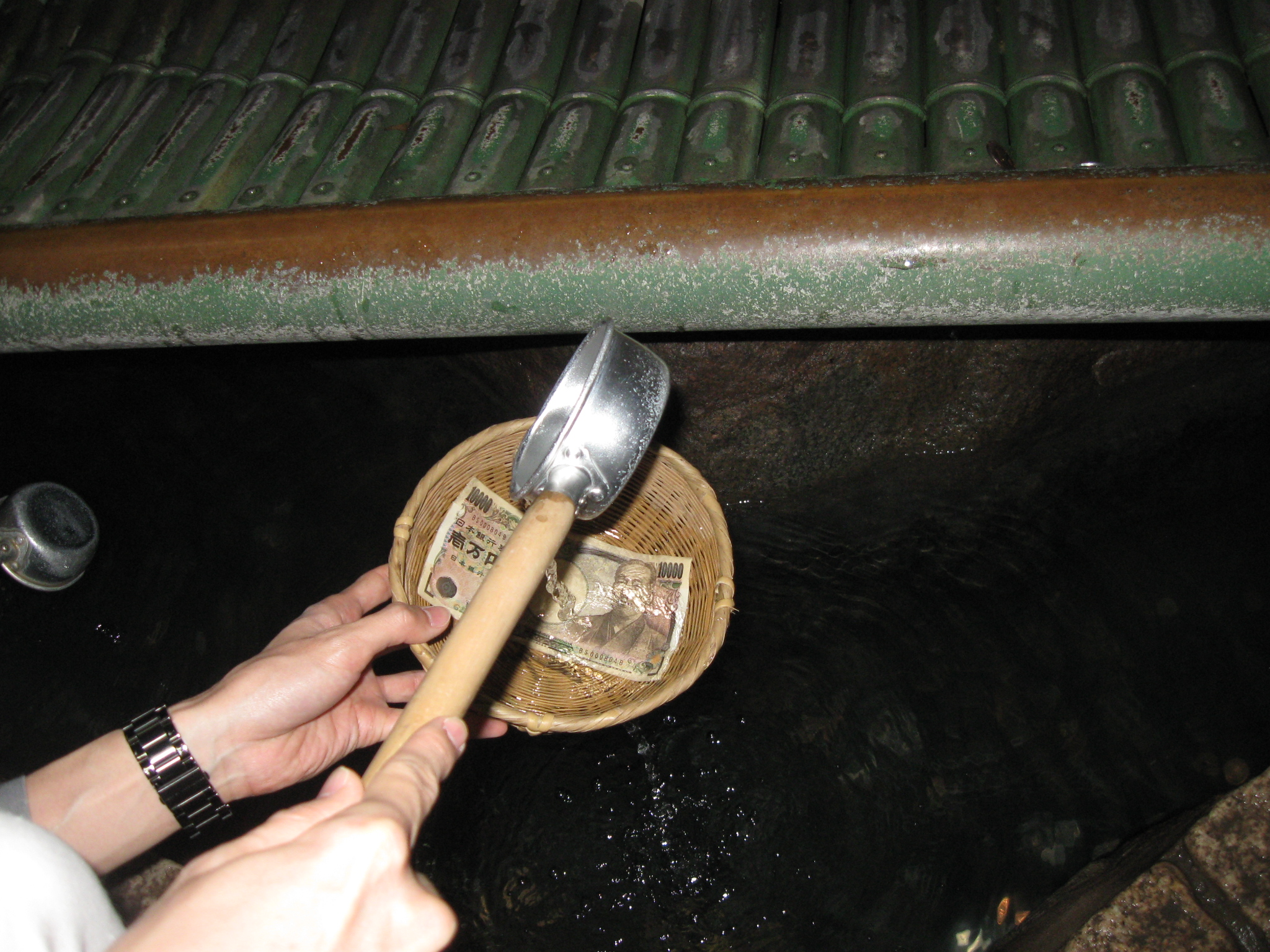
Visitors wash money.

The tradition of washing money at the spring in the hope of seeing it multiply was born in 1257 (Shōka 1) when Kamakura's ruler Hōjō Tokiyori came here to worship and recommended the faithful to wash their coins, saying that if they did so, they certainly would be rewarded by Ugafukujin, who would multiply them and grant their descendants prosperity. He himself did so, and people started imitating him, starting a tradition which continues to this day and is the reason for the shrine's popularity. Its spring came to be called Zeniarai-mizu (銭洗水, money washing water) and during the Edo period was considered one of the Five Famous Springs of Kamakura (鎌倉五名水), noted for the quality of their waters. (Note: Kamakura has many "numbered" locality names like Five Famous Springs, Kamakura's Seven Entrances, etc. These are not traditional, but rather a creation of Tokugawa Mitsukuni's Shinpen Kamakurashi, an Edo period book and the first guide to Kamakura.)

The shintai (the object of worship, which houses the kami) is a stone snake with a human head, symbol of Ugafukujin, the kami of waters. The kami came to be identified and merged with Buddhist goddess Benzaiten (Sarasvati in Sanskrit) according to the then-dominant syncretic honji suijaku theory, which saw Japanese kami as no more than local manifestations of Indian Buddhist gods. Later, this syncretic entity came also to be associated with harvests, and now it is worshiped as a kami of prosperity.

The shrine has dozens of torii (Shinto gates), but also many Buddhist statues. The scent of incense, normally used only by Buddhist temples, is present. The reason is that Zeniarai Benzaiten is an uncommon example of the fusion of Buddhism and Shinto elements (Shinbutsu shūgō) that used to be the norm in Japan before the Meiji period, when most shrines were forced to get rid of all their Buddhist objects. Zeniarai Benten is one of those which, unlike Tsurugaoka Hachiman-gū, were able to retain them.

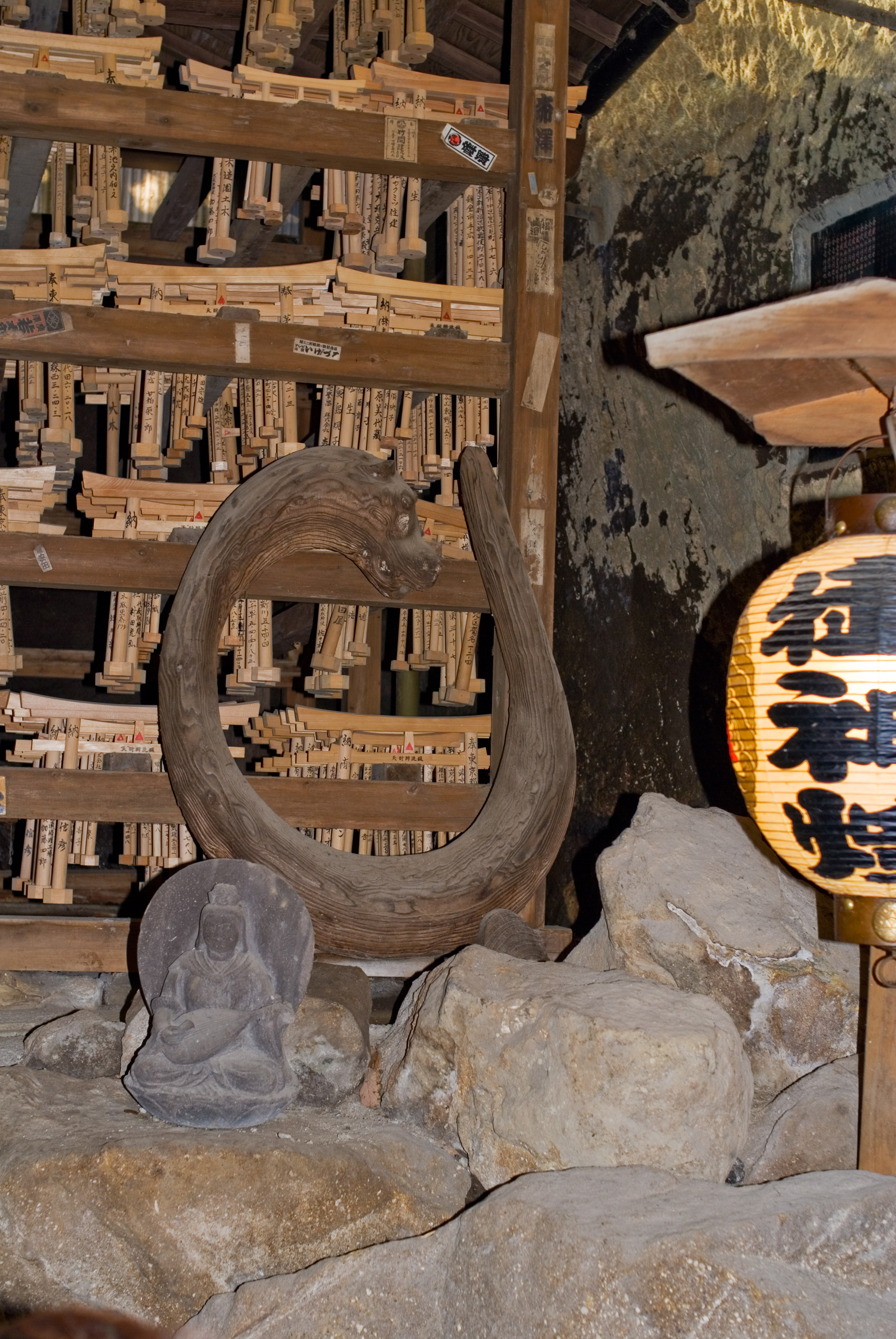
Ugafukujin's effigy in the Okunomiya

This 800-year-old shrine is unusual for several reasons, the first being that it is completely surrounded by high rock walls. Totally invisible from the outside, Zeniarai Benzaiten can be reached only through a tunnel (see photo above) and a narrow trail on its rear. Also, because it was built on irregular ground, its various buildings stand at different heights and are connected by stairs. The Naikū (内宮) enshrines Ichikishima-Hime-no-Mikoto (市杵島姫命). Its most visited hall, the Okugū (奥宮), dedicated to Ugafukujin/Benzaiten, is not a building but a cave. In it, water flows and the faithful can wash their bills and coins with sieves (available from the shrine counter for a small fee). There are also shrines dedicated to the Seven Lucky Gods (Shichifuku Jinja (七幅神社), upper shrine) and to the god of water (水波売神 (Mizuhame-no-kami), lower shrine).

A 1970 survey revealed a group of yagura dating back to at least the 10th century (Note: Artificial caves used as tombs during the Kamakura and Muromachi periods) above the shrine's tunnel (see photo above). Excavations revealed several Buddhist steles, which are now at the Kamakura Museum of National Treasures.

Because of its convenience, the tunnel is now the de facto main entrance of the shrine, however it and its approach (sandō) were built in 1958. The shrine's main approach is on the opposite side of the shrine, near the tea houses. Like the first, it is covered by several torii donated by the faithful. It leads to a narrow road and then to the Sasukegayatsu (佐助ヶ谷) valley. In the past it was the only entrance to the shrine, and this seems to be the reason for the name "Kakurezato" (see above) given at the time to the area.
