= Enoshima Engi =

The Enoshima Engi (江嶋縁起) is a history of the temples and shrines on Enoshima Island in Sagami Bay. It was written in Chinese, the scholarly language of the time, by the Japanese Buddhist monk Kōkei in 1047 AD.

The Enoshima Engi consists of two separate parts. The first tells the story of the tribulations of prehistoric villagers who lived in the vicinity of Enoshima. The villagers were plagued for a period of a thousand-some years by a destructive, five-headed dragon (Gozuryu:五頭竜) that had its lair in a nearby lake. Aware of their suffering, on May 31, 552 AD, the Goddess Benzaiten caused the island of Enoshima to arise from the bottom of the bay to serve as her abode. She then descended onto the island amidst a series of spectacular terrestrial and aerial phenomena. The dragon fell in love with the beautiful goddess and asked her to be his consort. Benzaiten, who was widely known for her persuasive eloquence, rejected the dragon's proposal and made it understand that it had been doing wrong by plaguing the villagers. Ashamed, the dragon promised to cease its wrongdoing. It then faced south (devotedly facing the island where Benzaiten lived) and changed into a hill. To this day, the hill is known as Dragon's-Mouth Hill (Japanese: tatsu-no-kuchi yama 龍の口山).

Although this story seems fantastic on the surface, it very likely contains many factual elements. The dragon, for example, is probably a metaphor for the water of a violent local river that is still notorious for its floods. Its five heads were probably four of the river's tributaries plus the mouth of the river. The descent of the goddess may have been inspired by aerial phenomena such as the passage of a large meteor.

The second part of the Enoshima Engi relates visits to Enoshima by eminent monks. Among the visitors was Jikaku Daishi (慈覺大師), the posthumous name of Ennin (圓仁, 792-862 AD), the third chief priest of Enryaku-ji (延暦寺), the center of Buddhism in Japan.
