= Tōkai-ji (Chiba) =

Buddhist temple in Chiba Prefecture, Japan

Coordinates: 35°53′N 140°0′E

Tōkai-ji 東海寺
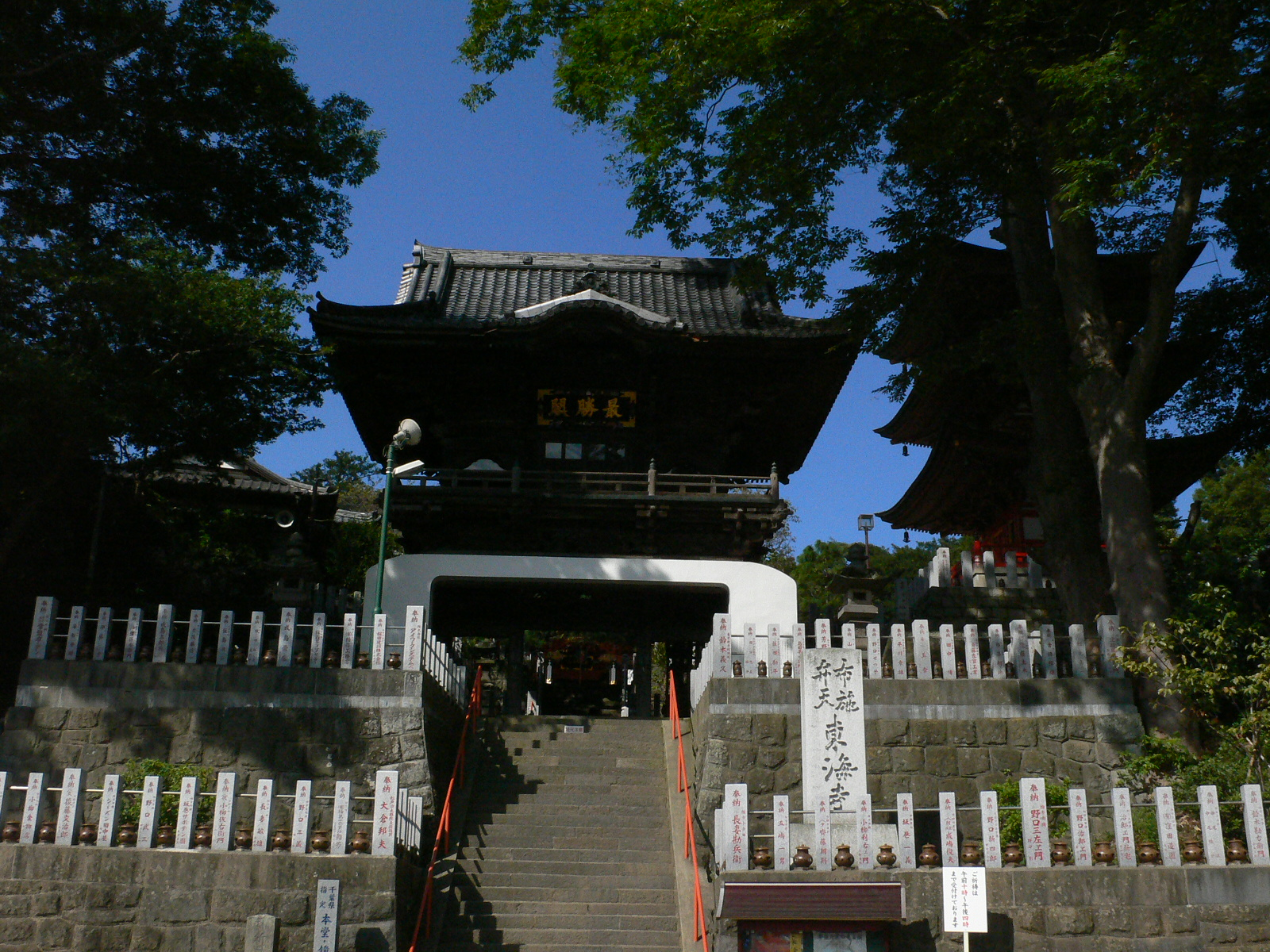

Religion
- Affiliation: Shingon Buzan Sect
- Deity: Benzaiten

Location
- Location: 1738 Fuse, Kashiwa, Chiba Prefecture
- Country: Japan
- Interactive map of Tōkai-ji 東海寺

Architecture
- Founder: Emperor Saga (traditionally)
- Completed: 807 (traditionally)

Website
- http://huse-benten.com/

Tōkai-ji (東海寺), formally called Kōryūzan Fuse Benten Tōkai-ji (紅龍山布施弁天東海寺), is a Buddhist temple located in the city of Kashiwa in Chiba Prefecture, Japan.

== History ==
In the year 807, Emperor Saga requested Kūkai to found this temple.

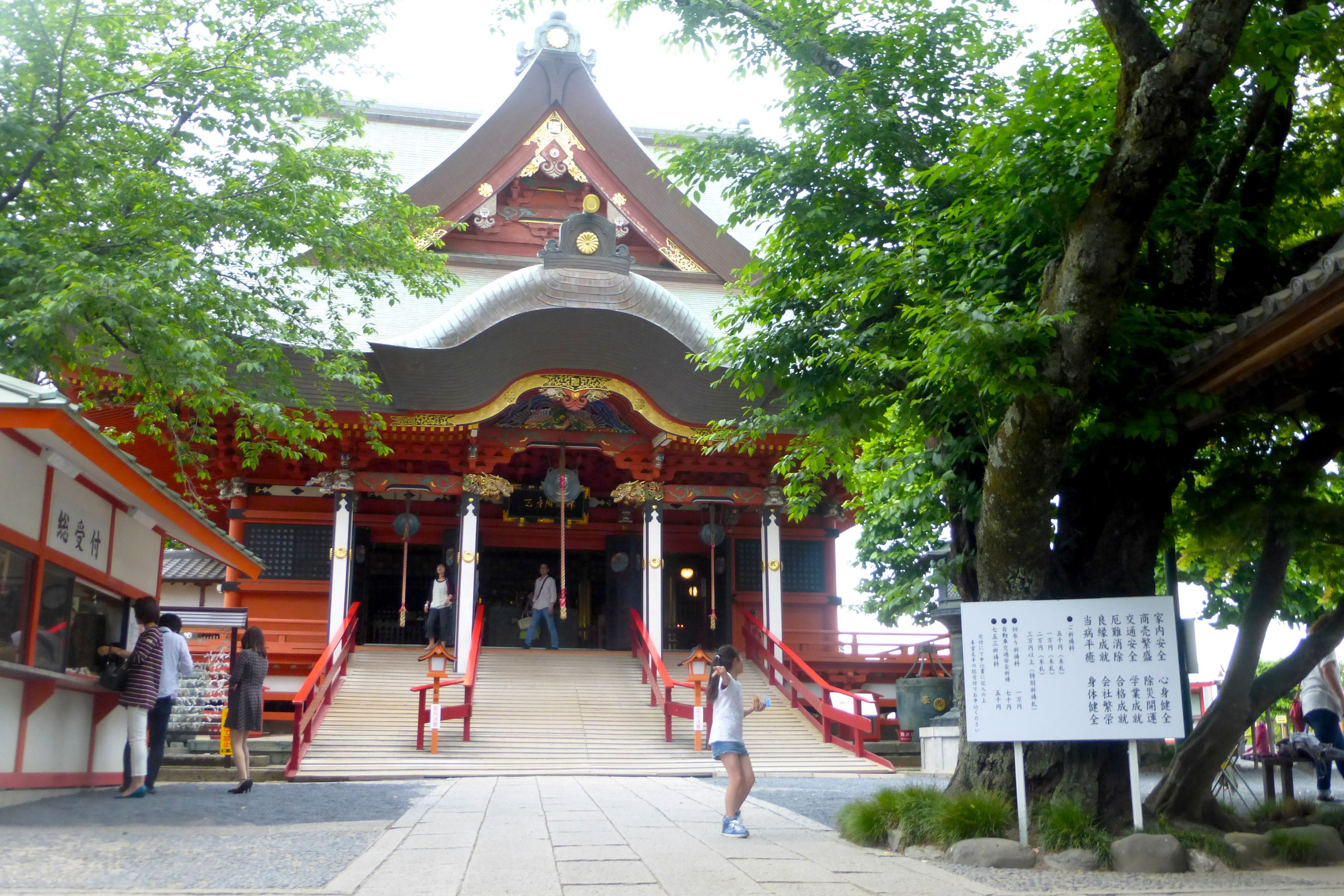

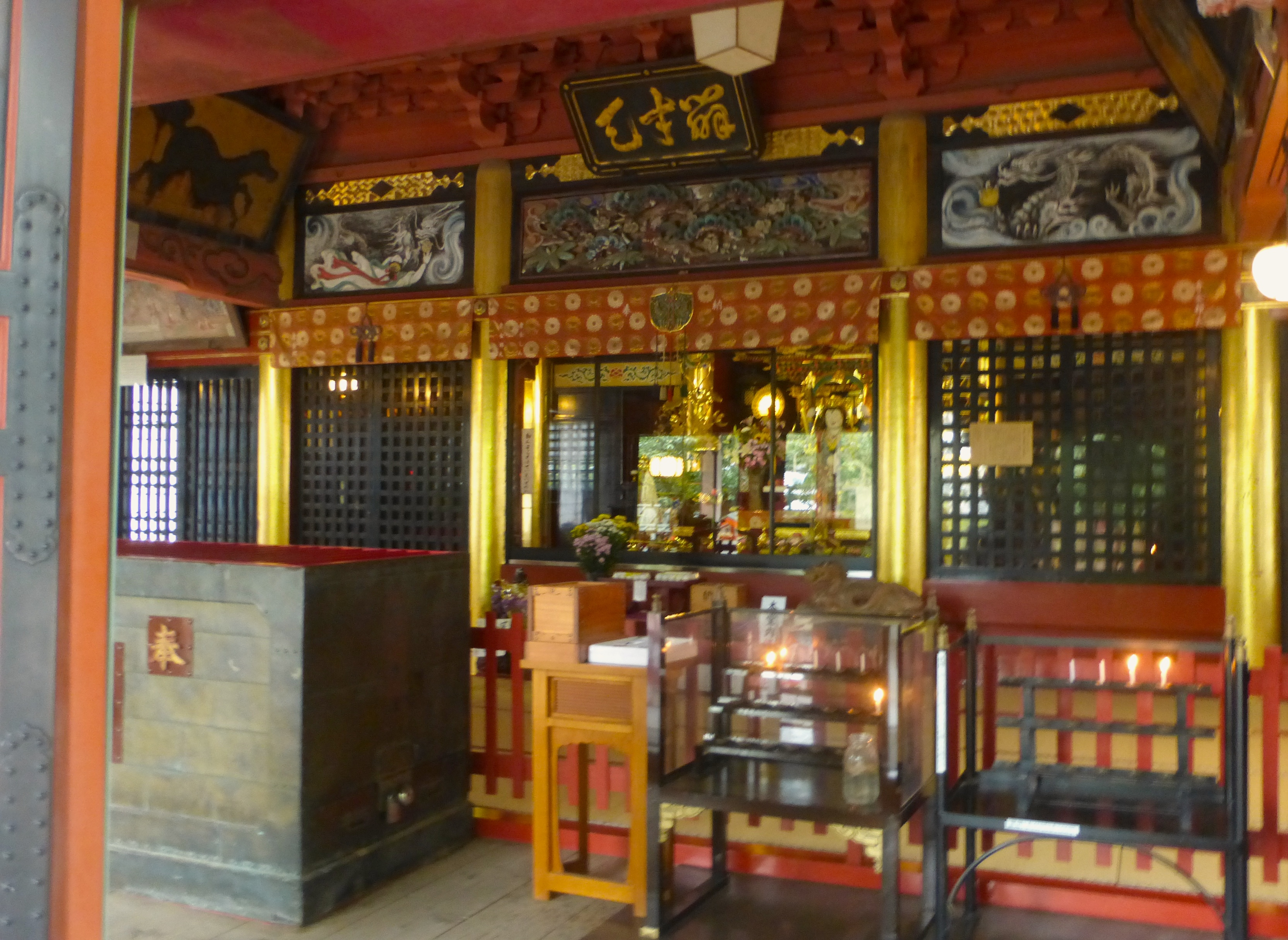

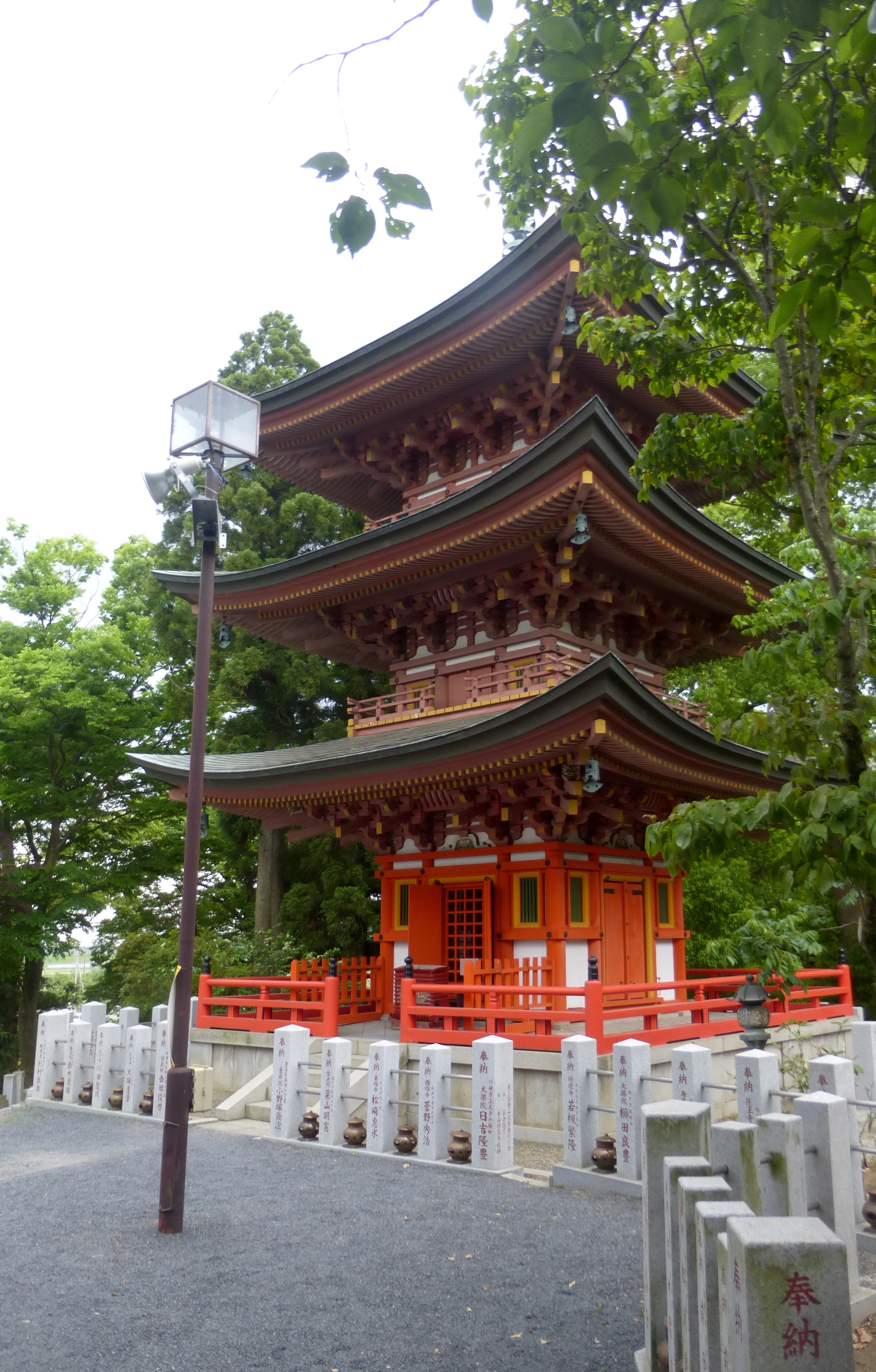

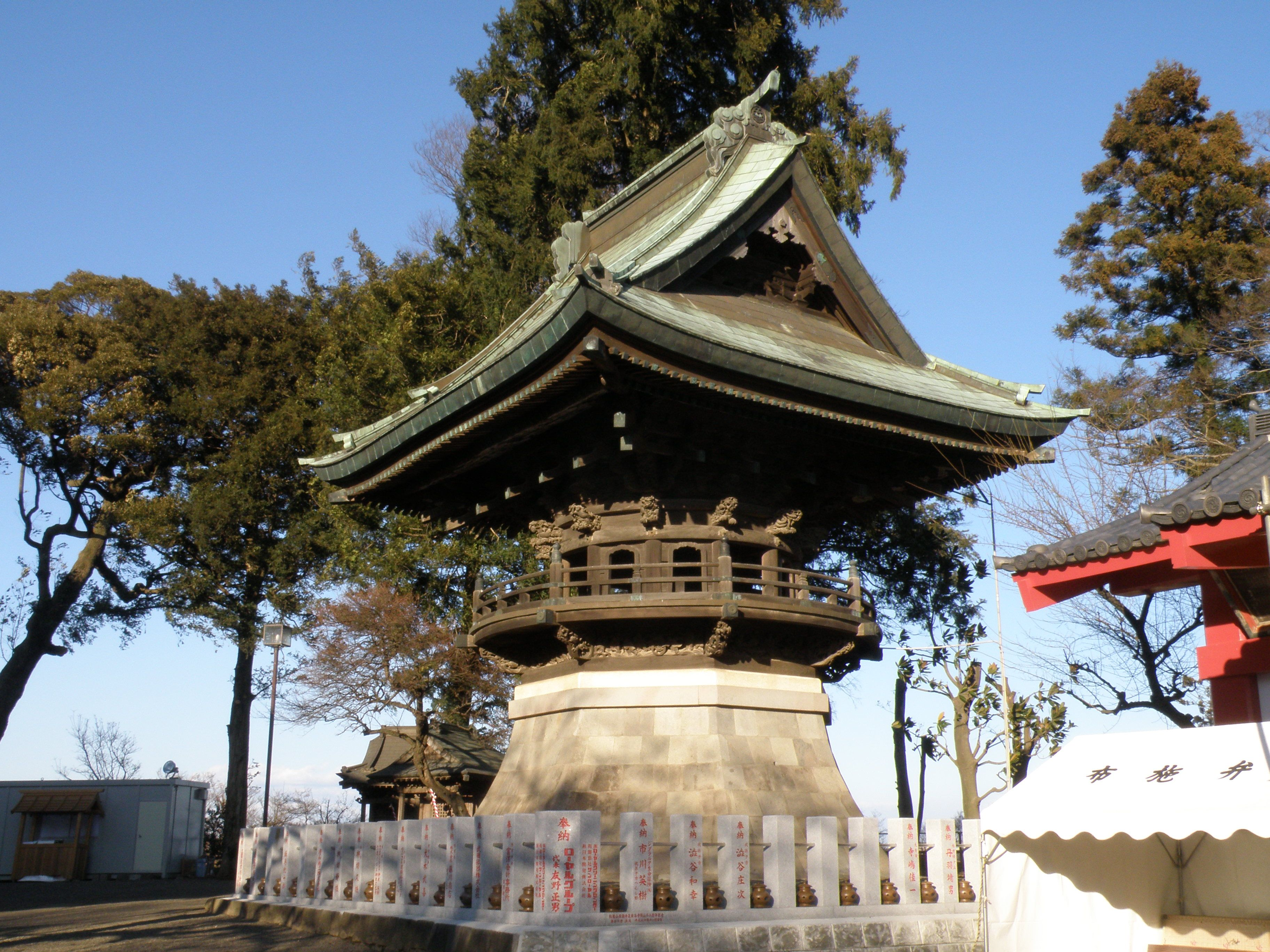
