= Namuchi =

Asura (demon) in Hindu mythology

- Member of Rakshasas
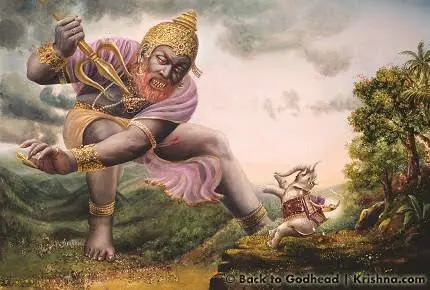
- Namuchi attacking Indra and his elephant Airavata.
- Other names: Namuki
- Abode: Atala
- Battles: Devasura War

Namuchi (Sanskrit: नमुचि, romanized: Namuchi), also written as Namuci and known as Namuki in Vedic texts, is an Asura (demon) in Hindu mythology. He was mentioned in the Rigveda and later in the Mahabharata and Puranas which offer varying accounts of his life and death. Namuchi is often associated with other powerful Asuras and is portrayed as an adversary of the gods, particularly Indra.

== Etymology ==
The name Namuchi is derived from the Sanskrit roots na (न), meaning "not," and much (मुच्), meaning "to release" or "to let go." This etymology is symbolic of his character.

== Legend and literature ==
The stories of Namuchi mostly vary in different aspects in different texts. The stories although mainly focuses on fights between Namuchi and Indra, where Indra always wins. Most known stories of Namuchi are:

1) In the Mahabharata, Namuchi was a fierce Rakshasa. He was the son of Prajapati Kashyapa and Danu, and thus a brother to the Daityas and Danavas who often stood against the Devas in their cosmic battles. His stature among the Asuras was such that even Indra, the king of the gods, found himself unable to defeat him by conventional means.

During one of the great wars between the gods and the Asuras, Namuchi led a vast army against the Devas. Indra struck down countless Asura warriors. Yet Namuchi remained impervious to every attack. Realizing that he could not be slain by Indra's weapons, Namuchi retreated into the rays of the Sun, as Surya's rays protected him.

Indra, however, discovered him. Cornered, Namuchi proposed a pact that would make him untouchable. He declared that he could not be slain by staff or bow, nor by the palm of Indra's hand nor by his fist. He further insisted that he could not be killed during day or night, nor by anything that was either wet or dry. These conditions were phrased so carefully that they seemed to rule out any possible means of attack. At last, Indra agreed.

"Oh, noble giant, I will not kill you by wet or dry thing, in the night or in the day, with my fist nor palm, with a staff nor bow. What I say is true."

With this assurance, Namuchi emerged from the rays of the Sun. Through the power of Sura-liquor, he deprived Indra of his very strength. In some accounts, he stripped from him the essence of food itself and even the Soma. Indra, suddenly weakened and desperate, sought the help of the Ashvins, as well as the goddess Saraswati. He lamented to them that though he had kept his word and honored the treaty.

By means of the Surâ-liquor Namuki, the Asura, carried off Indra's (source of) strength, the essence of food, the Soma-drink. He (Indra) hasted up to the Asvins and Sarasvatî, crying, 'I have sworn to Namuki, saying, "I will slay thee neither by day nor by night, neither with staff nor with bow, neither with the palm of my hand nor with the fist, neither with the dry nor with the moist!" and yet has he taken these things from me: seek ye to bring me back these things! — Satapatha Brahmana, translated by Julius Eggeling (1900), Kanda XII, Adhyaya VII, Brahmana III, Verse 1

It was with their guidance that Indra found a way to turn the conditions of the pact against Namuchi himself. Indra waited until twilight, time which is neither fully day nor fully night. Namuchi was again cornered at the seashore and he was suffocated with sea foam a substance that is neither entirely wet nor entirely dry. With this strange weapon, he struck Namuchi and severed his head.

This victory came with a great cause. Though Indra had not broken the literal terms of his vow, he had violated its spirit. Namuchi, as a son of the sage Kashyapa, was regarded as a Brahmin, and in killing him Indra incurred the terrible sin of Brahmahatya. This sin manifested as Namuchi's severed head which rose against Indra following him across the worlds.

At last, unable to bear the torment, Indra sought the counsel of Brahma, who instructed him to perform an act of purification. Indra was told to bathe at the sacred confluence of rivers known as Arunasangama. Obeying the command, he immersed himself in the holy waters, and there the sin of Brahmahatya was washed away. From that time, Arunasangama was regarded as a pilgrimage.

2) In the Padma Purana, Namuchi is described as a captain of the Asura king Hiranyaksha's army. In this account, he fights Indra and briefly renders him unconscious. He made the elephant Airāvata thrust its tusks on the ground. He then uses his magical powers to create an army of monstrous creatures. However, Vishnu intervenes and destroys Namuchi's creations with the Sudarshana Chakra. Ultimately, it is Indra who delivers the final blow and kills him.

The Indra-Namuchi myth' has varying stories across puranas like Padma Purana. Some are scattered throughout the Brahmana literature (cf. VS [Vajaseneyi Samhita] 10.34; PB [Pancavimsa Brahmana] 12.6.8, MS [Maitrayani Samhita] IV.34; TB [Taittiriya Brahmana] 1.7.1.6)', the fullest version is in the Shatapatha Brahmana. Indra defeating Namuchi itself originates from the Rigveda (e.g. 10.73):

tvaṃ jaghantha namuciṃ makhasyuṃ dāsaṃ kṛṇvāna ṛṣayevimāyam |
tvaṃ cakartha manave syonān patho devatrāñjasevayānān ||

— RigVeda transliteration of Book 10, Hymn 73, Verse 7
Translation:

War-loving Namuci thou smotest, robbing the Dāsa of his magic for the Ṛṣi.
For man thou madest ready pleasant pathways, paths leading as it were directly God-ward.

— RigVeda translation by Ralph T.H. Griffith (1896) of Book 10, Hymn 73, Verse 7

== See also ==
- Bali
- Brahmahatya
- Danu
- Mara (demon)
- Shatapatha Brahmana
- Vritra
