= Ugajin =

Japanese mythology deity (kami)

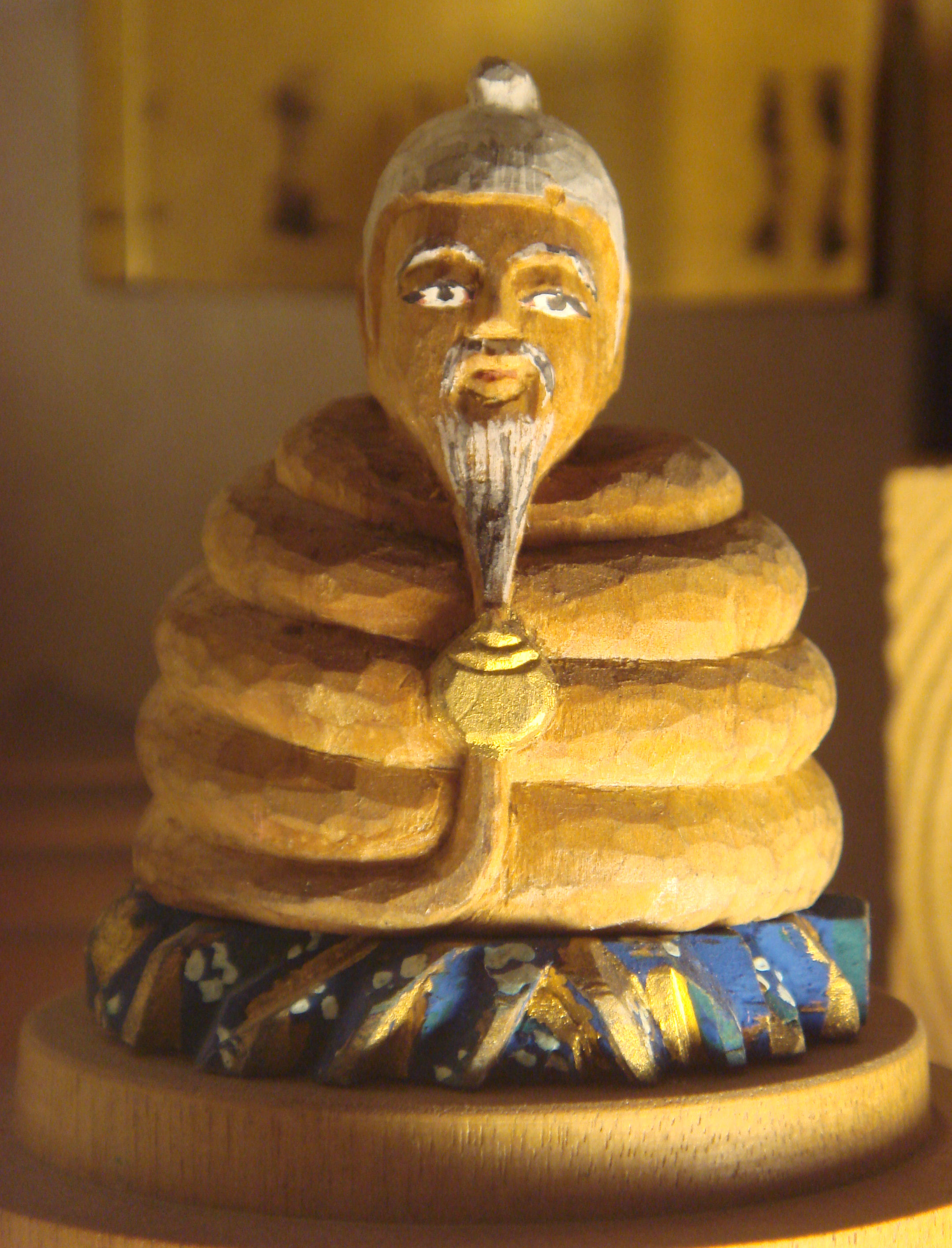
Ugajin (宇賀神), masculine form

Ugajin (宇賀神) is a harvest and fertility kami of Japanese mythology. Ugajin is represented both as a male and a female, and is often depicted with the body of a snake and the head of a bearded man, for the masculine variant, or the head of a woman, for the female variant. In Tendai Buddhism Ugajin was syncretically fused with Buddhist goddess Benzaiten, which became known as Uga Benzaiten or Uga Benten. The goddess sometimes carries on her head Ugajin's effigy.

In this limited sense, the kami is part of the Japanese Buddhist pantheon.

== Gallery ==
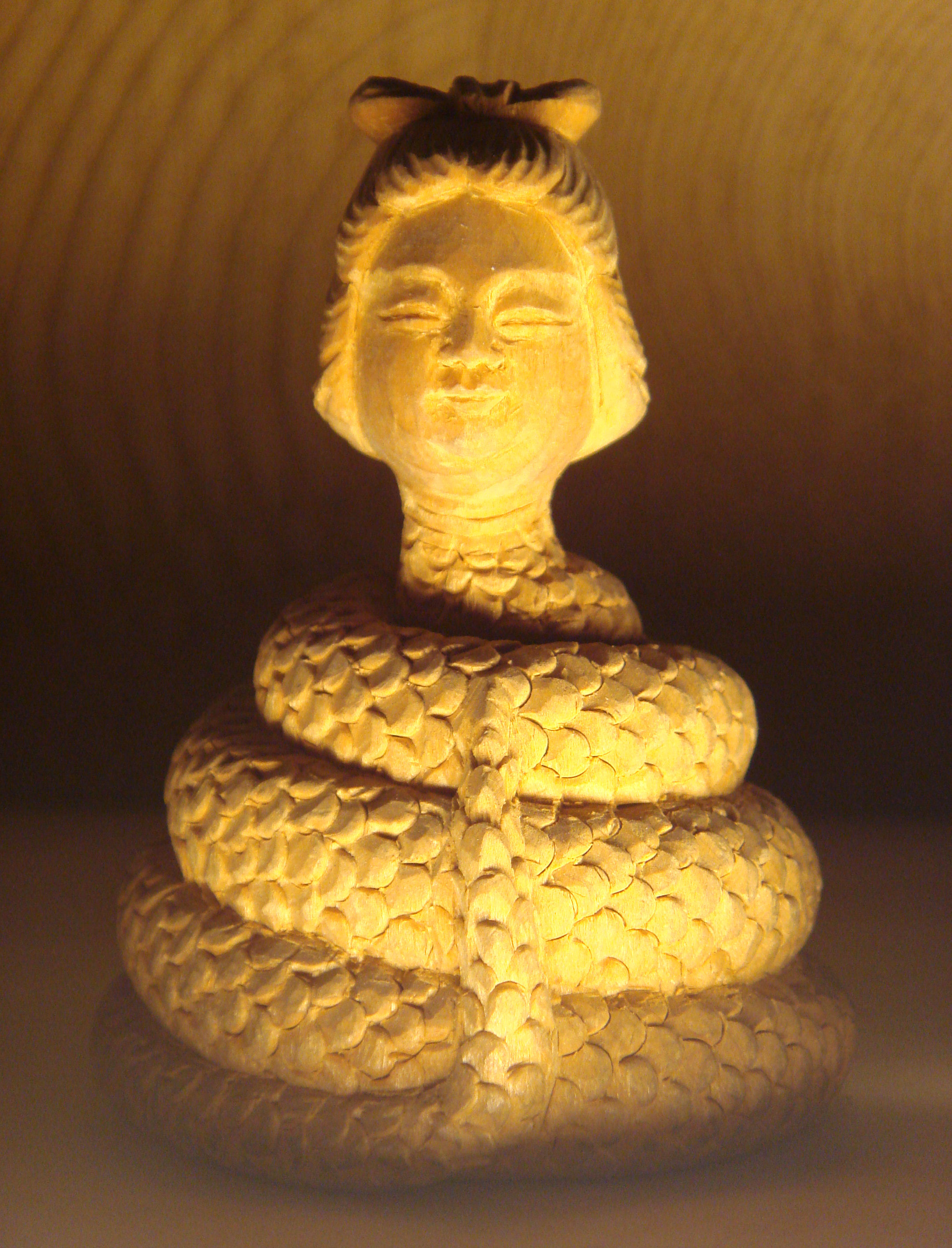
Ugajin's feminine form

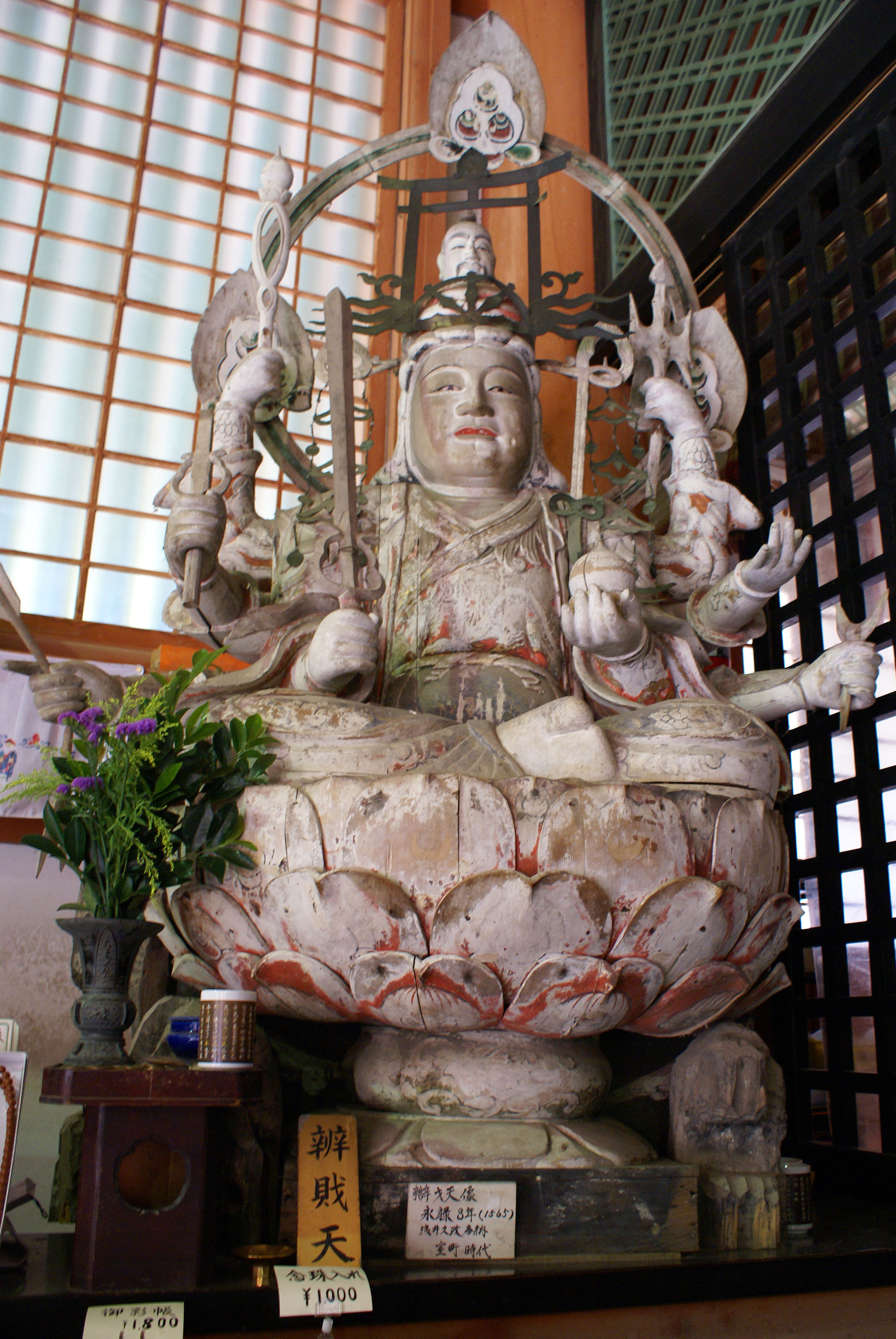
Statue of Benzaiten, a torii and a male Ugajin visible on her head (whose coiled serpent body is barely visible behind her crown)

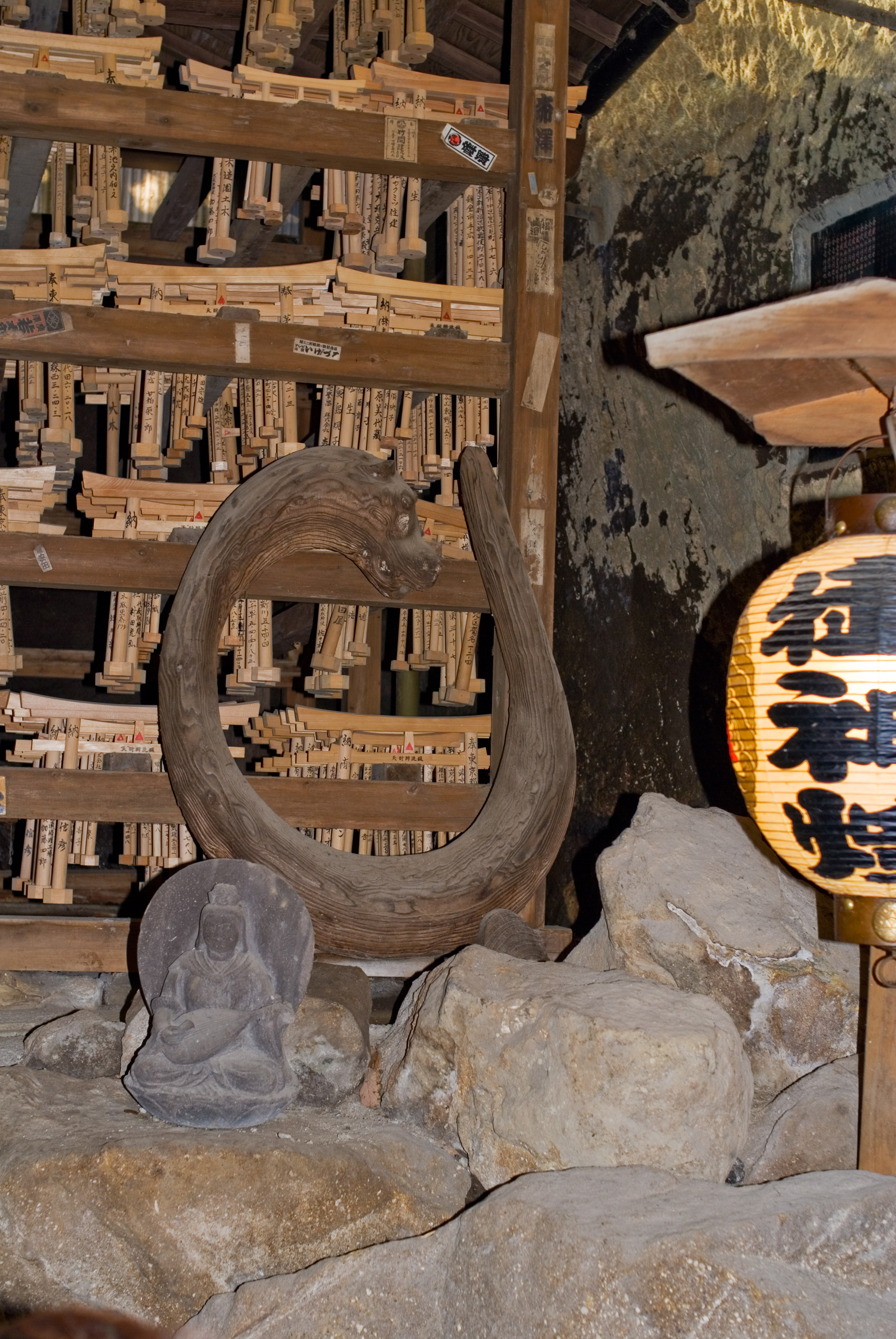
Wooden snake at Zeniarai Benzaiten Ugafuku Shrine
