= Bodhisattva =

Buddhist term for aspirant to enlightenment

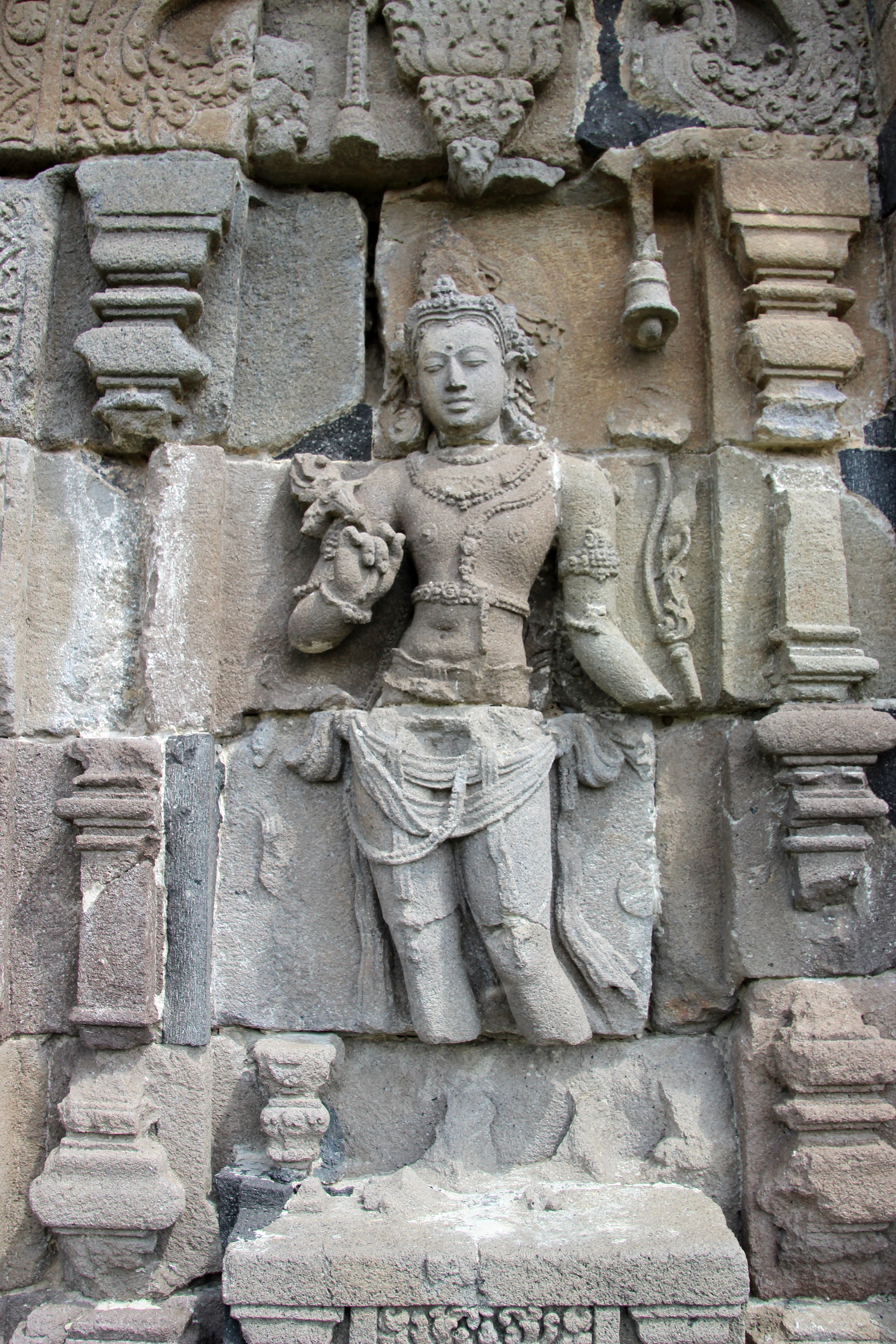
- A 9th-century relief depicting Avalokiteśvara Bodhisattva, from the Candi Plaosan temple located in Central Java, Indonesia
- Sanskrit: बोधिसत्त्व (bodhisattva)
- Pāli: बोधिसत्त (bodhisatta)
- Burmese: ဗောဓိသတ် (bɔ́dḭθaʔ)
- Chinese: 菩薩/菩提薩埵, (pinyin: púsà/pútísàduǒ), (Jyutping: pou4 saat3/pou4 tai4 saat3 do3), (Wade–Giles: p'u^{2}-sa^{4})
- Indonesian: Bodhisatwa
- Japanese: 菩薩/菩提薩埵 (romaji: bosatsu/bodaisatta)
- Khmer: ពោធិសត្វ (UNGEGN: poŭthĭsât)
- Korean: 보살, 菩薩 / 보리살타, 菩提薩埵 (RR: bosal / borisalta)
- Mongolian: Бодисад / Бодисадва (bodisad / bodisadva)
- Sinhala: බෝධි සත්ත්ව (bodhisatva)
- Tagalog: Bodisatta ᜊᜓᜇ᜔ᜑᜒᜐᜆ
- Thai: โพธิสัตว์ (phothisat)
- Tibetan: བྱང་ཆུབ་སེམས་དཔའ་ (jang chup sem pa)
- Vietnamese: Bồ Tát 菩薩/Bồ-đề-tát-đóa 菩提薩埵

Information
- Venerated by: Theravāda, Mahāyāna, Vajrayāna, Navayāna

In Buddhism, a bodhisattva (Note: English: /ˌboʊdiːˈsʌtvə/ BOH-dee-SUT-və; Sanskrit: बोधिसत्त्व, romanized: bodhisattva; Pali: बोधिसत्त, romanized: bodhisatta, also spelled bodhisatva) is a person who has attained, or is striving towards, bodhi (meaning ‘awakening', 'enlightenment') or Buddhahood. Often, the term specifically refers to a person who forgoes or delays personal nirvana or bodhi in order to compassionately help other individuals reach Buddhahood.

In the Early Buddhist schools, as well as modern Theravāda Buddhism, bodhisattva (or bodhisatta) refers to someone who has made a resolution to become a Buddha and has also received a confirmation or prediction from a living Buddha that this will come to pass. In Theravāda Buddhism, the bodhisattva is mainly seen as an exceptional and rare individual. Only a few select individuals are ultimately able to become bodhisattvas, such as Maitreya.

In Mahāyāna Buddhism, a bodhisattva refers to anyone who has generated bodhicitta, a spontaneous wish and compassionate mind to attain Buddhahood for the benefit of all sentient beings. Mahayana bodhisattvas are spiritually heroic persons that work to attain awakening and are driven by a great compassion (mahākaruṇā). These beings are exemplified by important spiritual qualities such as the "four divine abodes" (brahmavihāras) of loving-kindness (maitrī), compassion (karuṇā), empathetic joy (muditā) and equanimity (upekṣā), as well as the various bodhisattva "perfections" (pāramitās), which include prajñāpāramitā ("transcendent knowledge" or "perfection of wisdom") and skillful means (upāya).

Mahāyāna Buddhism generally understands the bodhisattva path as being open to everyone, and Mahāyāna Buddhists encourage all individuals to become bodhisattvas. Spiritually advanced bodhisattvas such as Avalokiteshvara, Maitreya, and Manjushri are also widely venerated across the Mahāyāna Buddhist world and are believed to possess great magical power, which they employ to help all living beings.

== Etymology ==
Bodhisattva is a combination of two Sanskrit words: Bodhi (बोधि), meaning "awakening" or "enlightenment" and Sattva (सत्त्व), meaning "being", as pertaining to a person who has achieved, or is striving towards, bodhi ('awakening' or 'enlightenment') or Buddhahood. The etymology of the Indic terms bodhisattva and bodhisatta is not fully understood. The term bodhi is uncontroversial and means "awakening" or "enlightenment" (from the root budh-). The second part of the compound has many possible meanings or derivations, including:

- Sattva and satta commonly means "living being", "sentient being" or "person" and many modern scholars adopt an interpretation based on this etymology. Examples include: "a sentient or reasonable being, possessing bodhi" (H. Kern), "a bodhi-being, i.e. a being destined to attain fullest Enlightenment" (T. W. Rhys Davids and W. Stede), "A being seeking for bodhi" (M. Anesaki), "Erleuchtungswesen" (Enlightenment Being) (M. Winternitz), and "Weisheitswesen" ("Wisdom Being") (M. Walleser). This etymology is also supported by the Mahayana Samādhirāja Sūtra, which defines a bodhisattva as "one who admonishes or exhorts all beings."
- According to Har Dayal, the term bodhi-satta may correspond with the Sanskrit bodhi-sakta which means "one who is devoted to bodhi" or "attached to bodhi". Later, the term may have been wrongly sanskritized to bodhi-satva. Hayal notes that the Sanskrit term sakta (from sañj) means "clung, stuck or attached to, joined or connected with, addicted or devoted to, fond of, intent on". This etymology for satta is supported by some passages in the Early Buddhist Texts (such as at SN 23.2, parallel at SĀ 122). The etymology is also supported by the Pāli commentaries, Jain sources and other modern scholars like Tillman Vetter and Neumann. Another related possibility pointed out by K.R. Norman and others is that satta carries the meaning of śakta, and so bodhisatta means "capable of enlightenment."
- The Sanskrit term sattva may mean "strength, energy, vigour, power, courage"; therefore, bodhisattva could mean "one whose energy and power is directed towards bodhi". This reading of sattva is found in Ksemendra's AvadanakalpaIata. Har Dayal supports this reading, noting that sattva is "almost certainly related to the Vedic word satvan, which means 'a strong or valiant man, hero, warrior'" and thus, the term bodhisatta should be interpreted as "heroic being, spiritual warrior."
- Sattva may also mean spirit, mind, sense, consciousness, or geist. Various Indian commentators like Prajñakaramati interpret the term as a synonym for citta (mind, thought) or vyavasāya (decision, determination). Thus, the term bodhisattva could also mean: "one whose mind, intentions, thoughts or wishes are fixed on bodhi". In this sense, this meaning of sattva is similar to the meaning it has in the Yoga-sutras, where it means mind.
- Tibetan lexicographers translate bodhisattva as byang chub (bodhi) sems dpa (sattva). In this compound, sems means mind, while dpa means "hero, strong man" (Skt. vīra). Thus, this translation combines two possible etymologies of sattva explained above: as "mind" and as "courageous, hero".
- Chinese Buddhists generally use the term pusa (菩薩), a phonetic transcription of the Sanskrit term. However, early Chinese translators sometimes used a meaning translation of the term bodhisattva, which they rendered as mingshi (明士), which means "a person who understands", reading sattva as "man" or "person" (shi, 士).
- In Sanskrit, sattva can mean "essence, nature, true essence", and the Pali satta can mean "substance". Some modern scholars interpret bodhisattva in this light, such as Monier-Williams, who translates the term as "one who has bodhi or perfect wisdom as his essence."

== Early Buddhism ==
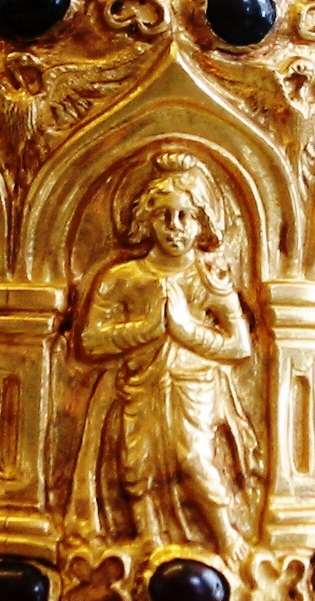
Probable early image of a bodhisattva (Bimaran casket, 50 CE)

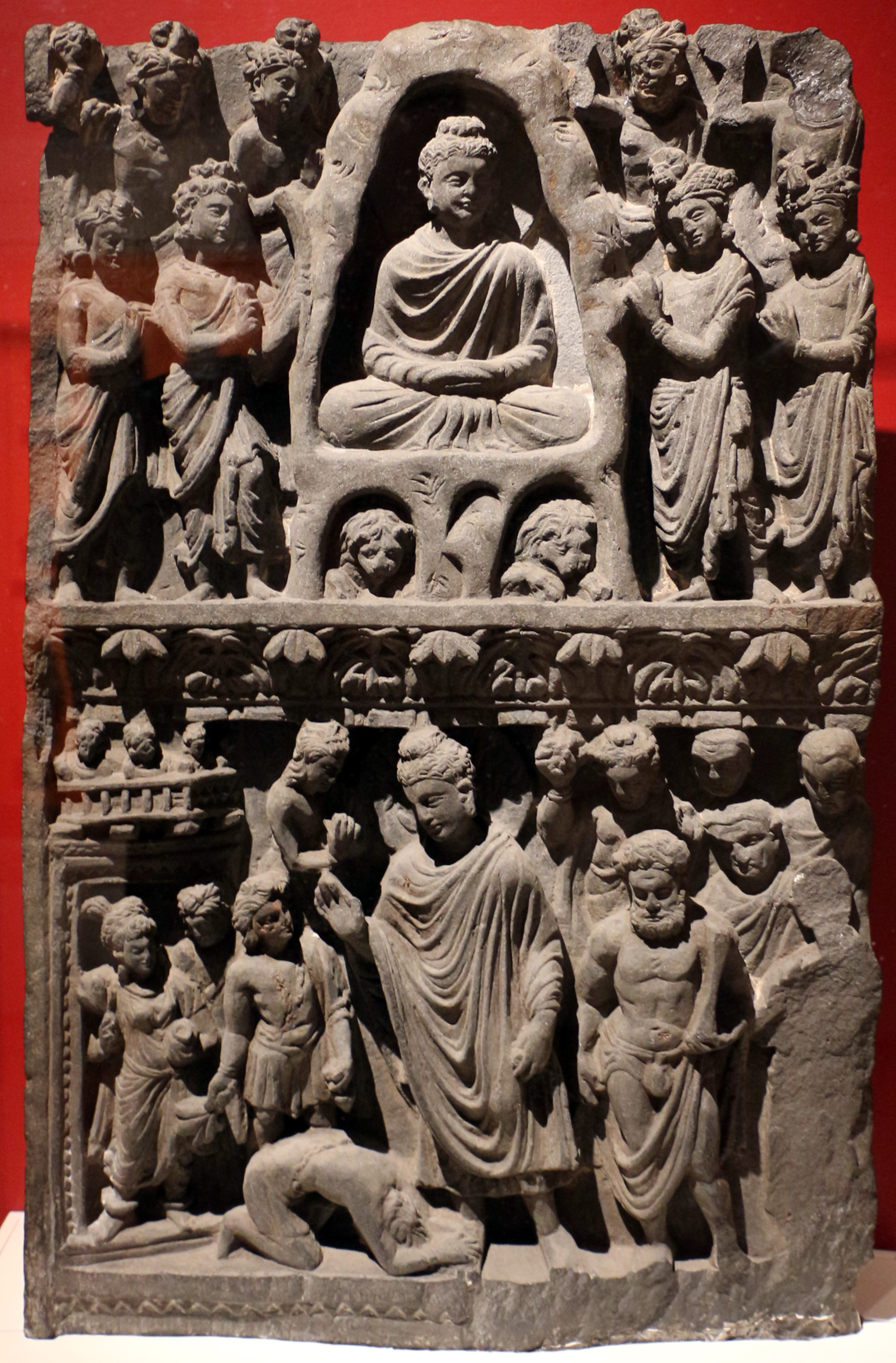
Gandharan relief depicting the bodhisattva (future Gautama Buddha) taking a vow at the foot of Dipankara Buddha, Art Institute of Chicago

In pre-sectarian Buddhism, the term bodhisatta is used in the early texts to refer to Gautama Buddha in his previous lives and as a young man in his last life, when he was working towards liberation. In the early Buddhist discourses, the Buddha regularly uses the phrase "when I was an unawakened Bodhisatta" to describe his experiences before his attainment of awakening. The early texts which discuss the period before the Buddha's awakening mainly focus on his spiritual development. According to Bhikkhu Analayo, most of these passages focus on three main themes: "the bodhisattva's overcoming of unwholesome states of mind, his development of mental tranquillity, and the growth of his insight."

Other early sources like the Acchariyabbhutadhamma-sutta (MN 123, and its Chinese parallel in Madhyama-āgama 32) discuss the marvelous qualities of the bodhisattva Gautama in his previous life in Tuṣita heaven. The Pali text focuses on how the bodhisattva was endowed with mindfulness and clear comprehension while living in Tuṣita, while the Chinese source states that his lifespan, appearance, and glory was greater than all the devas (gods). These sources also discuss various miracles which accompanied the bodhisattva's conception and birth; most famously, his taking seven steps and proclaiming that this was his last life. The Chinese source (titled Discourse on Marvellous Qualities) also states that while living as a monk under the Buddha Kāśyapa he "made his initial vow to [realize] Buddhahood [while] practicing the holy life."

Another early source that discusses the qualities of bodhisattvas is the Mahāpadāna sutta. This text discusses bodhisattva qualities in the context of six previous Buddhas who lived long ago, such as Buddha Vipaśyī. Yet another important element of the bodhisattva doctrine, the prediction of someone's future Buddhahood, is found in another Chinese early Buddhist text, the Discourse on an Explanation about the Past (MĀ 66). In this discourse, a monk named Maitreya aspires to become a Buddha in the future and the Buddha then predicts that Maitreya will become a Buddha in the future. Other discourses found in the Ekottarika-āgama present the "bodhisattva Maitreya" as an example figure (EĀ 20.6 and EĀ 42.6); one sutra in this collection discusses how the Buddha taught the bodhisattva path of the six perfections to Maitreya (EĀ 27.5).

'Bodhisatta' may also connote a being who is "bound for enlightenment"; in other words, a person whose aim is to become fully enlightened. In the Pāli canon, the Bodhisatta (bodhisattva) is described as someone who is still subject to birth, illness, death, sorrow, defilement, and delusion. According to the Theravāda monk Bhikkhu Bodhi, while all the Buddhist traditions agree that to attain Buddhahood, one must "make a deliberate resolution" and fulfill the spiritual perfections (pāramīs or pāramitās) as a bodhisattva, the actual bodhisattva path is not taught in the earliest strata of Buddhist texts such as the Pali Nikayas (and their counterparts such as the Chinese Āgamas) which instead focus on the ideal of the arahant.

The oldest known story about how Gautama Buddha becomes a bodhisattva is the story of his encounter with the previous Buddha, Dīpankara. During this encounter, a previous incarnation of Gautama, variously named Sumedha, Megha, or Sumati offers five blue lotuses and spreads out his hair or entire body for Dīpankara to walk on, resolving to one day become a Buddha. Dīpankara then confirms that they will attain Buddhahood. Early Buddhist authors saw this story as indicating that the making of a resolution (abhinīhāra) in the presence of a living Buddha and his prediction/confirmation (vyākaraṇa) of one's future Buddhahood was necessary to become a bodhisattva. According to Drewes, "all known models of the path to Buddhahood developed from this basic understanding."

Stories and teachings on the bodhisattva ideal are found in the various Jataka tale sources, which mainly focus on stories of the past lives of the Sakyamuni. Among the non-Mahayana Nikaya schools, the Jataka literature was likely the main genre that contained bodhisattva teachings. These stories had certainly become an important part of popular Buddhism by the time of the carving of the Bharhut Stupa railings (c. 125–100 BCE), which contain depictions of around thirty Jataka tales. Thus, it is possible that the bodhisattva ideal was popularized through the telling of Jatakas. Jataka tales contain numerous stories which focus on the past life deeds of Sakyamuni when he was a bodhisattva. These deeds generally express bodhisattva qualities and practices (such as compassion, the six perfections, and supernatural power) in dramatic ways, and include numerous acts of self-sacrifice.

Apart from Jataka stories related to Sakyamuni, the idea that Metteya (Maitreya), who currently resides in Tuṣita, would become the future Buddha and that this had been predicted by the Buddha Sakyamuni was also an early doctrine related to the bodhisattva ideal. It first appears in the Cakkavattisihanadasutta. According to A. L. Basham, it is also possible that some of the Ashokan edicts reveal knowledge of the bodhisattva ideal. Basham even argues that Ashoka may have considered himself a bodhisattva, as one edict states that he "set out for sambodhi."

== Nikāya schools ==
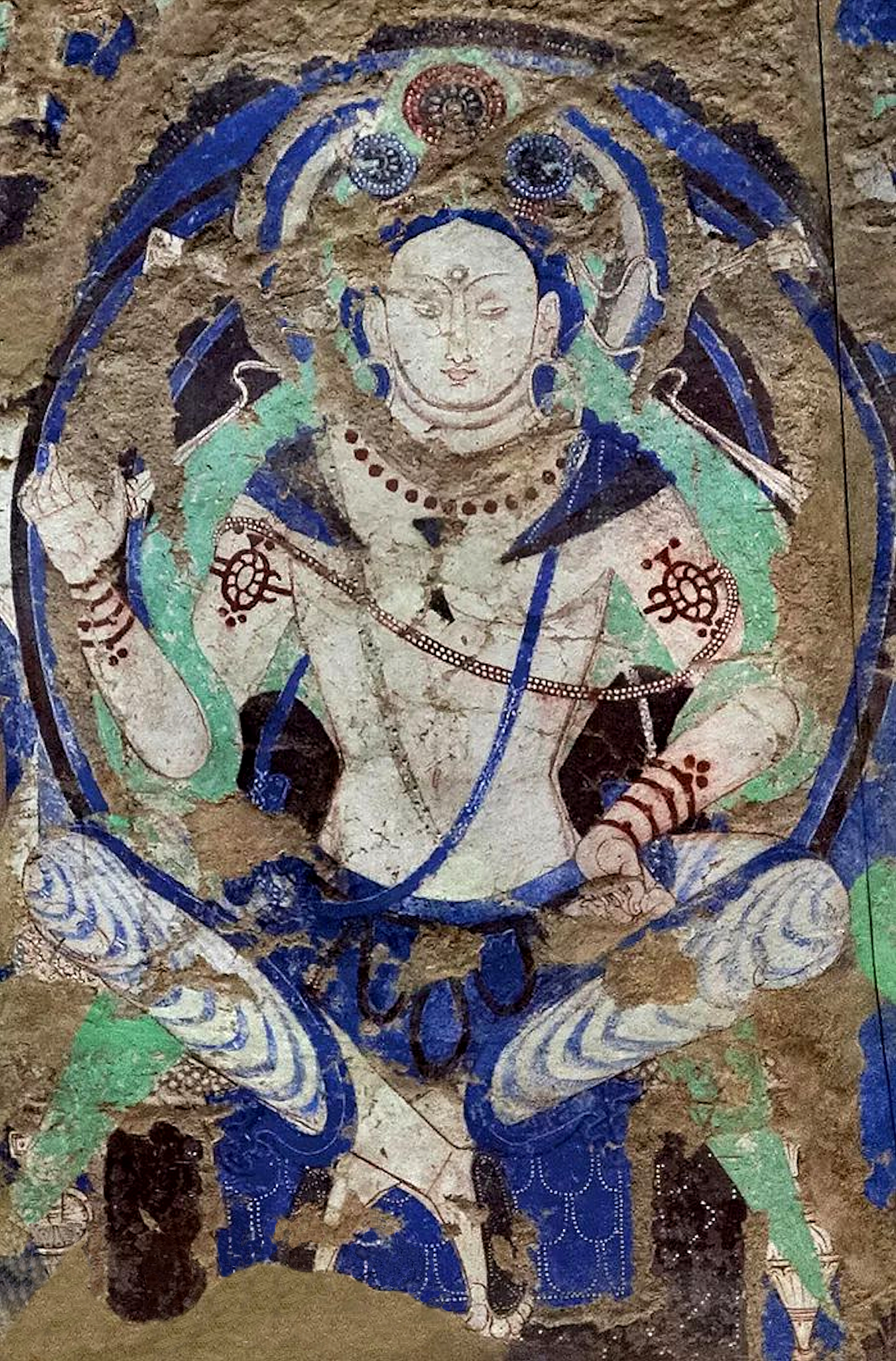
6th century painting of Maitreya, Kizil Caves, Cave 224

By the time that the Buddhist tradition had developed into various competing sects, the idea of the bodhisattva vehicle (Sanskrit: bodhisattvayana) as a distinct (and superior) path from that of the arhat and solitary buddha was widespread among all the major non-Mahayana Buddhist traditions or Nikaya schools, including Theravāda, Sarvāstivāda and Mahāsāṃghika. The doctrine is found, for example, in 2nd century CE sources like the Avadānaśataka and the Divyāvadāna. The bodhisattvayana was referred by other names such as "vehicle of the perfections" (pāramitāyāna), "bodhisatva dharma", "bodhisatva training", and "vehicle of perfect Buddhahood".

According to various sources, some of the Nikaya schools (such as the Dharmaguptaka and some of the Mahasamghika sects) transmitted a collection of texts on bodhisattvas alongside the Tripitaka, which they termed "Bodhisattva Piṭaka" or "Vaipulya (Extensive) Piṭaka". None of these have survived. Dar Hayal attributes the historical development of the bodhisattva ideal to "the growth of bhakti (devotion, faith, love) and the idealisation and spiritualisation of the Buddha."

The North Indian Sarvāstivāda school held it took Gautama three "incalculable aeons" (asaṃkhyeyas) and ninety one aeons (kalpas) to become a Buddha after his resolution (praṇidhāna) in front of a past Buddha. During the first incalculable aeon he is said to have encountered and served 75,000 Buddhas, and 76,000 in the second, after which he received his first prediction (vyākaraṇa) of future Buddhahood from Dīpankara, meaning that he could no longer fall back from the path to Buddhahood. For Sarvāstivāda, the first two incalculable aeons is a period of time in which a bodhisattva may still fall away and regress from the path. At the end of the second incalculable aeon, they encounter a buddha and receive their prediction, at which point they are certain to achieve Buddhahood.

Thus, the presence of a living Buddha is also necessary for Sarvāstivāda. The Mahāvibhāṣā explains that its discussion of the bodhisattva path is partly meant "to stop those who are in fact not bodhisattvas from giving rise to the self-conceit that they are." However, for Sarvāstivāda, one is not technically a bodhisattva until the end of the third incalculable aeon, after which one begins to perform the actions which lead to the manifestation of the marks of a great person.

The Mahāvastu of the Mahāsāṃghika-Lokottaravādins presents various ideas regarding the school's conception of the bodhisattva ideal. According to this text, bodhisattva Gautama had already reached a level of dispassion at the time of Buddha Dīpaṃkara many aeons ago and he is also said to have attained the perfection of wisdom countless aeons ago.

The Mahāvastu also presents four stages or courses (caryās) of the bodhisattva path without giving specific time frames (though it's said to take various incalculable aeons). This set of four phases of the path is also found in other sources, including the Gandhari “Many-Buddhas Sūtra” (*Bahubudha gasutra) and the Chinese Fó běnxíng jí jīng (佛本行 集經, Taisho vol. 3, no. 190, pp. 669a1–672a11).

The four caryās (Gandhari: caria) are the following:

1. Natural (Sanskrit: prakṛti-caryā, Gandhari: pragidi, Chinese: 自性行 zì xìng xíng), one first plants the roots of merit in front of a Buddha to attain Buddhahood.
2. Resolution (praṇidhāna-caryā, G: praṇisi, C: 願性行 yuàn xìng xíng), one makes their first resolution to attain Buddhahood in the presence of a Buddha.
3. Continuing (anuloma-caryā, C: 順性行 shùn xìng xíng) or "development" (vivartana, G: vivaṭaṇa), in which one continues to practice until one meets a Buddha who confirms one's future Buddhahood.
4. Irreversible (anivartana-caryā, C: 轉性行 zhuǎn xìng xíng) or “course of purity” (G: śukracaria), this is the stage at which one cannot fall back and is assured of future Buddhahood.

== Theravāda ==
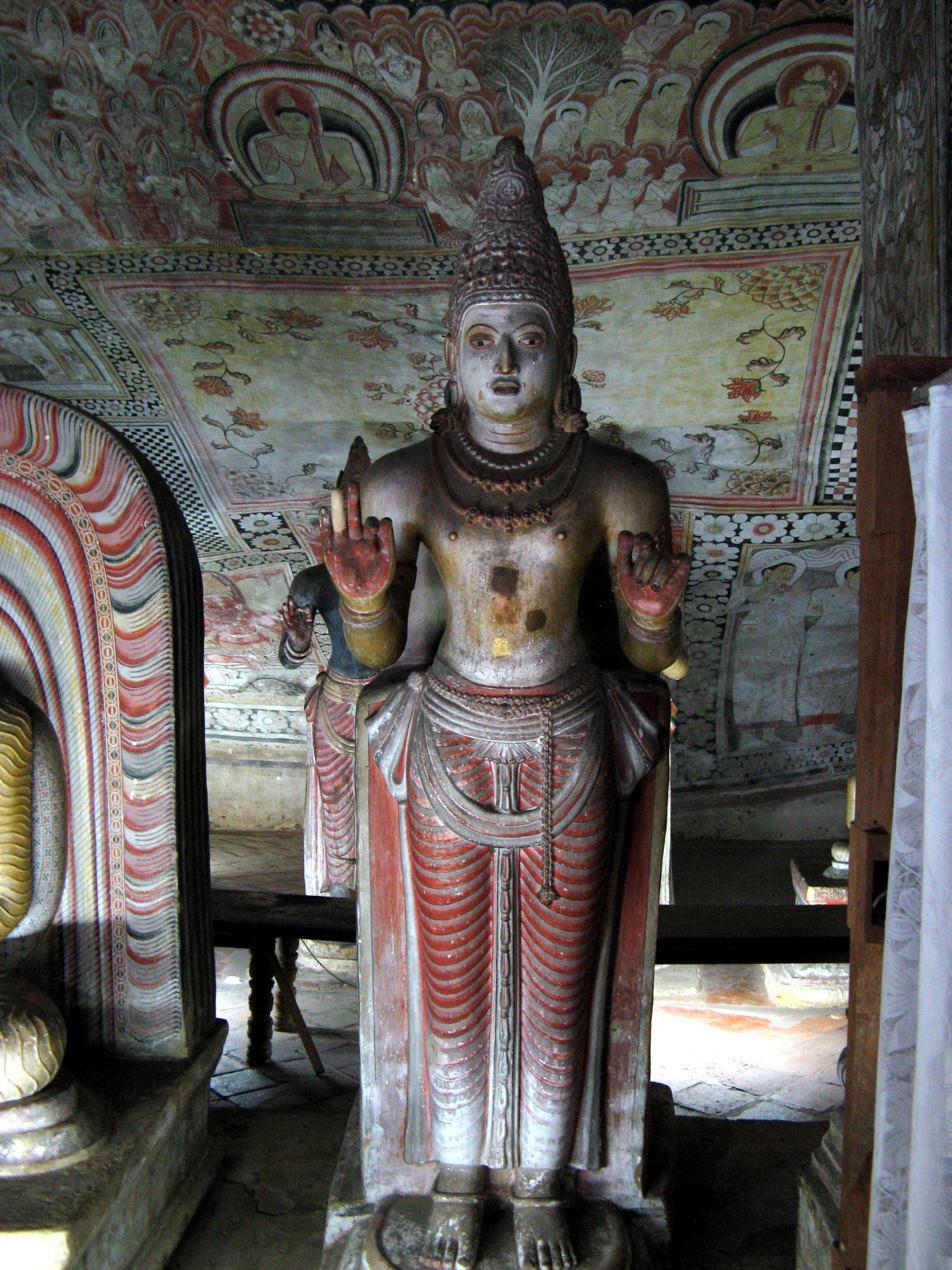
Sinhalese statue of Avalokiteśvara (also known as Natha, Lokeshvara Natha, Natha Deviyo) in Dambulla cave temple

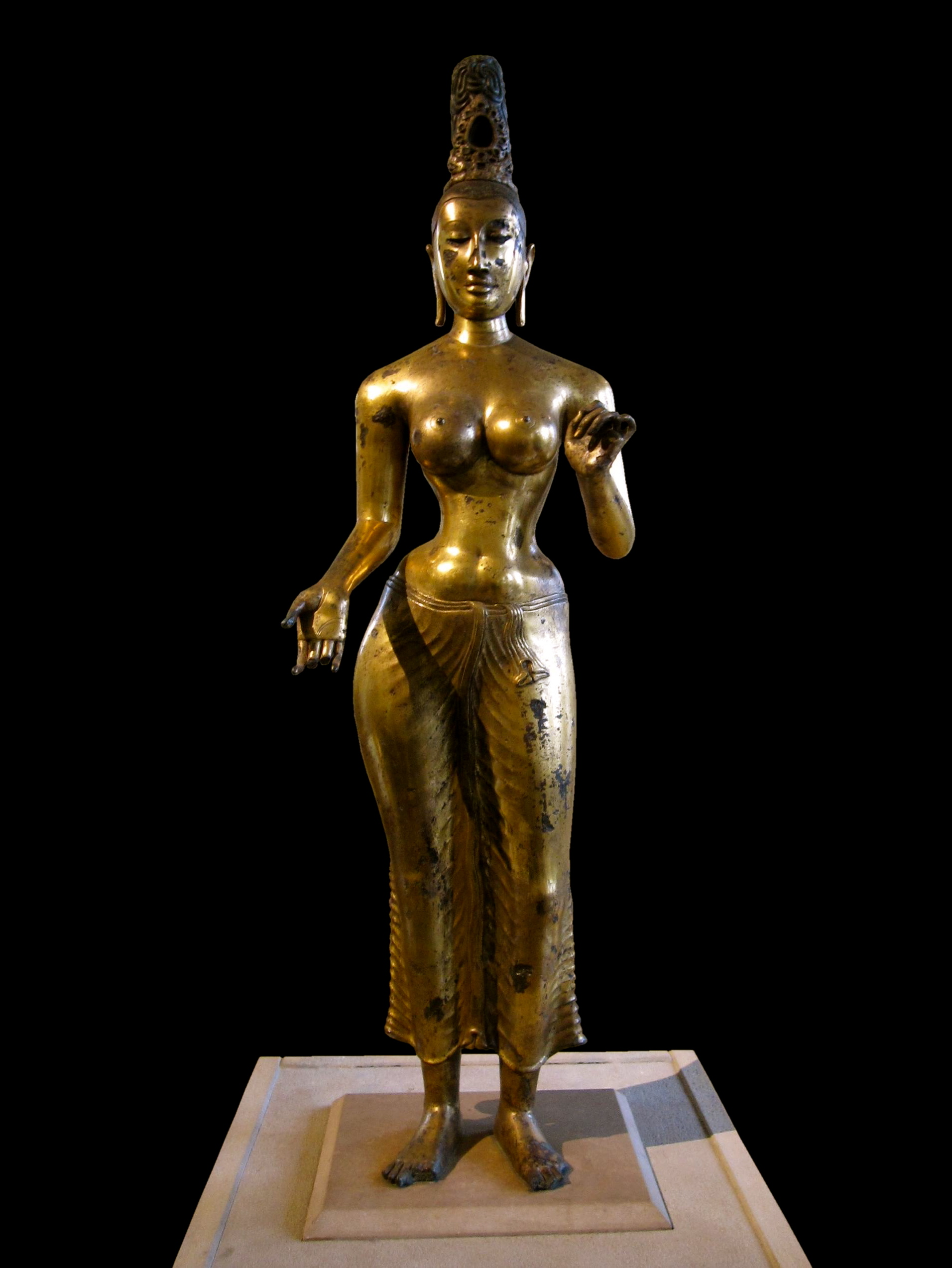
Gilded bronze statue of Tara, Sri Lanka, 8th century CE

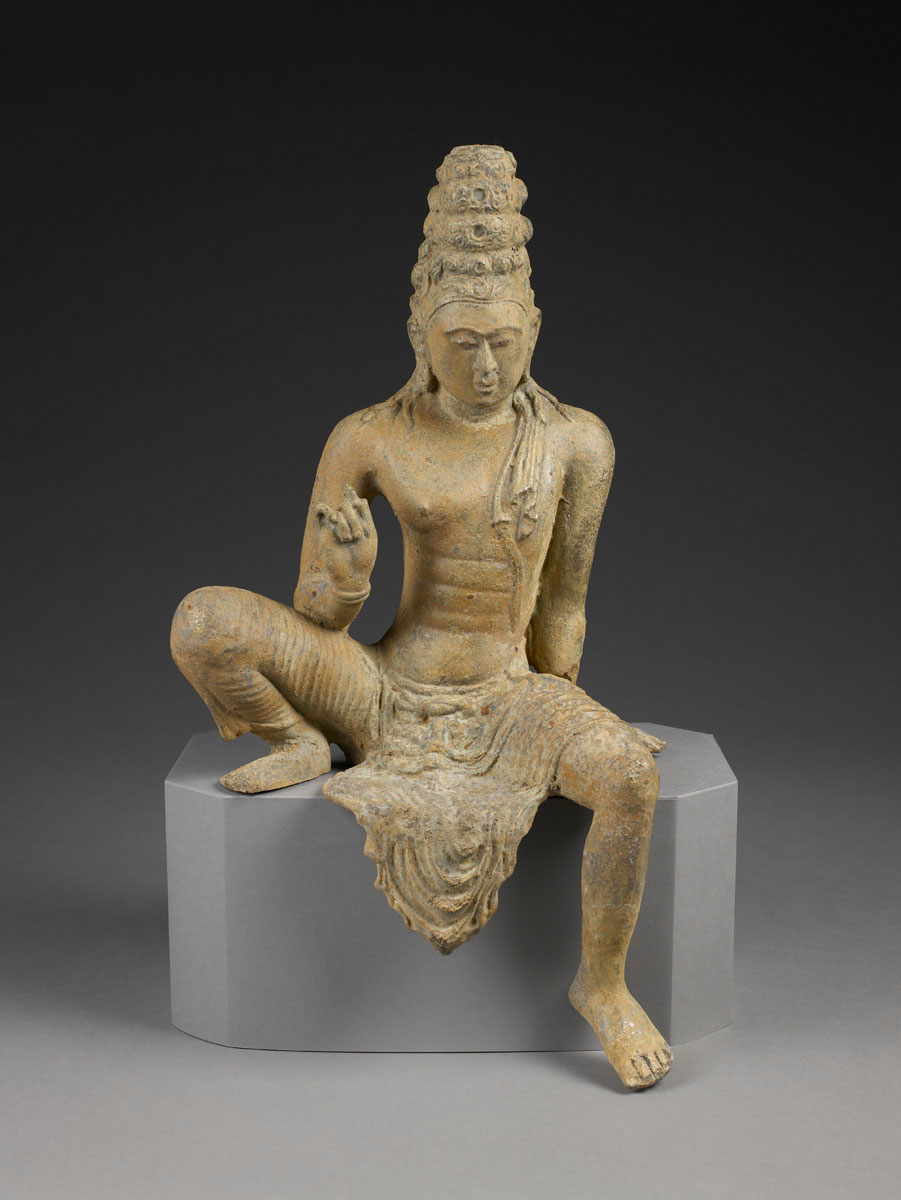
Bronze statue of the bodhisattva Avalokiteśvara. Sri Lanka, c. 750 CE

The bodhisattva ideal is also found in southern Buddhist sources, like the Theravāda school's Buddhavaṃsa (1st-2nd century BCE), which explains how Gautama, after making a resolution (abhinīhāra) and receiving his prediction (vyākaraṇa) of future Buddhahood from past Buddha Dīpaṃkara, he became certain (dhuva) to attain Buddhahood. Gautama then took four incalculable aeons and a hundred thousand, shorter kalpas (aeons) to reach Buddhahood. Several sources in the Pali Canon depict the idea that there are multiple Buddhas and that there will be many future Buddhas, all of which must train as bodhisattas. Non-canonical Theravada Jataka literature also teaches about bodhisattvas and the bodhisattva path. The worship of bodhisattvas like Metteya, Saman (Samantabhadra) and Natha (Avalokiteśvara) can also be found in Theravada Buddhism.

By the time of the great scholar Buddhaghosa (5th-century CE), orthodox Theravāda held the standard Indian Buddhist view that there were three main spiritual paths within Buddhism: the way of the Buddhas (buddhayāna) i.e. the bodhisatta path; the way of the individual Buddhas (paccekabuddhayāna); and the way of the disciples (sāvakayāna).

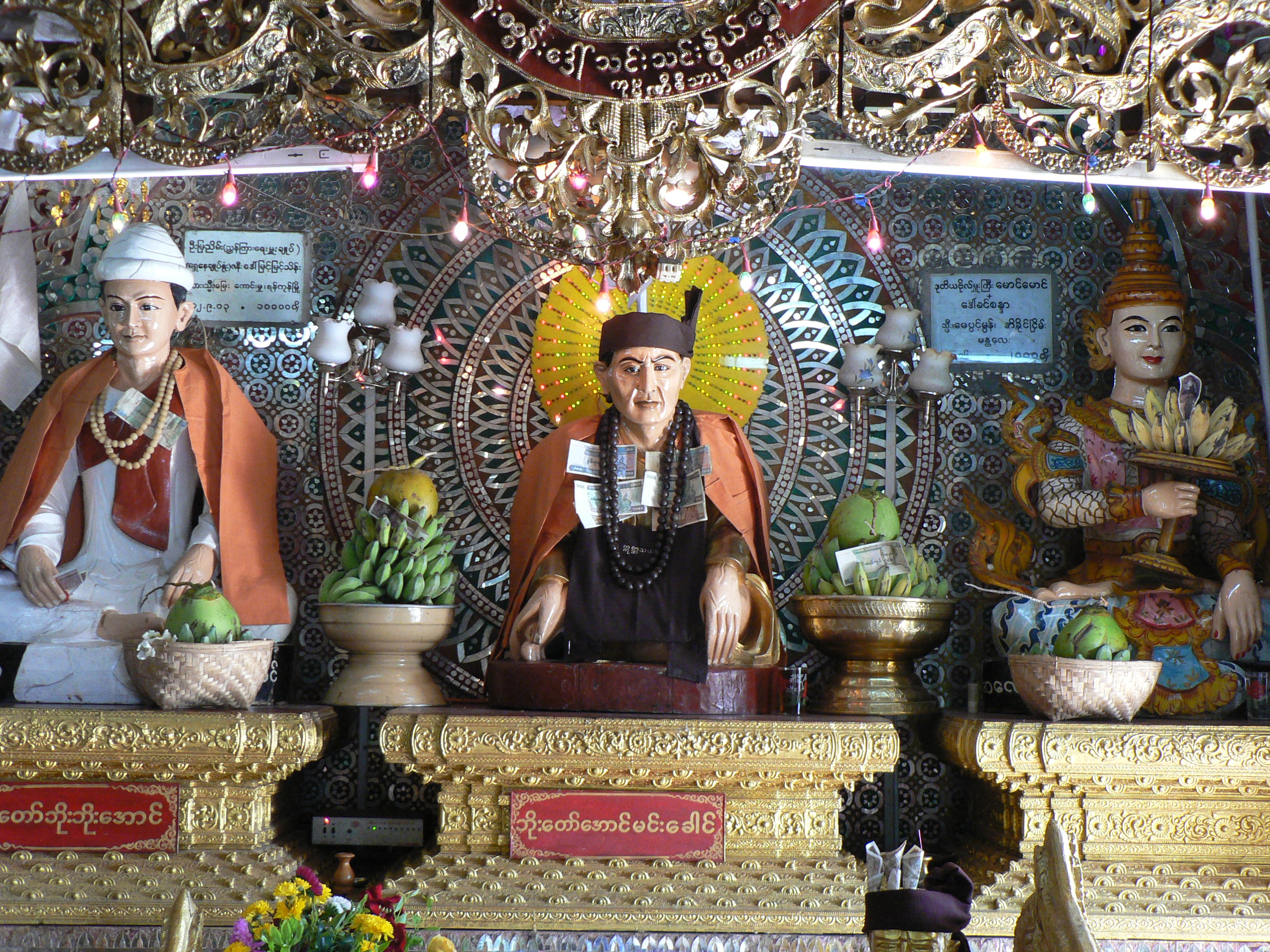
An altar depicting Burmese Buddhist weizzas. In this esoteric tradition, weizzas consider themselves to be bodhisattvas

The Sri Lankan commentator Dhammapāla (6th century CE) wrote a commentary on the Cariyāpiṭaka, a text which focuses on the bodhisattva path and on the ten perfections of a bodhisatta. Dhammapāla's commentary notes that to become a bodhisattva one must make a valid resolution in front of a living Buddha. The Buddha then must provide a prediction (vyākaraṇa) which confirms that one is irreversible (anivattana) from the attainment of Buddhahood. The Nidānakathā, as well as the Buddhavaṃsa and Cariyāpiṭaka commentaries makes this explicit by stating that one cannot use a substitute (such as a Bodhi tree, Buddha statue or Stupa) for the presence of a living Buddha, since only a Buddha has the knowledge for making a reliable prediction. This is the generally accepted view maintained in orthodox Theravada today.

According to Theravāda commentators like Dhammapāla as well as the Suttanipāta commentary, there are three types of bodhisattvas:

- Bodhisattvas "preponderant in wisdom" (paññādhika), like Gautama, reach Buddhahood in four incalculable aeons (asaṃkheyyas) and a hundred thousand kalpas.
- Bodhisattvas "preponderant in faith" (saddhādhika) take twice as long as paññādhika bodhisattvas
- Bodhisattvas "preponderant in vigor" (vīriyādhika) take four times as long as paññādhika bodhisattvas

According to modern Theravada authors, meeting a Buddha is needed to truly make someone a bodhisattva because any other resolution to attain Buddhahood may easily be forgotten or abandoned during the aeons ahead. The Burmese monk Ledi Sayadaw (1846–1923) explains that though it is easy to make vows for future Buddhahood by oneself, it is very difficult to maintain the necessary conduct and views during periods when the Dharma has disappeared from the world. One will easily fall back during such periods and this is why one is not truly a full bodhisattva until one receives recognition from a living Buddha.

Because of this, it was and remains a common practice in Theravada to attempt to establish the necessary conditions to meet the future Buddha Maitreya and thus receive a prediction from him. Medieval Theravada literature and inscriptions report the aspirations of monks, kings and ministers to meet Maitreya for this purpose. Modern figures such as Anagarika Dharmapala (1864–1933), and U Nu (1907–1995) both sought to receive a prediction from a Buddha in the future and believed meritorious actions done for the good of Buddhism would help in their endeavor to become bodhisattvas in the future.

Over time the term came to be applied to other figures besides Gautama Buddha in Theravada lands, possibly due to the influence of Mahayana. The Theravada Abhayagiri tradition of Sri Lanka practiced Mahayana Buddhism and was very influential until the 12th century. Kings of Sri Lanka were often described as bodhisattvas, starting at least as early as Sirisanghabodhi (r. 247–249), who was renowned for his compassion, took vows for the welfare of the citizens, and was regarded as a mahāsatta (Sanskrit: mahāsattva), an epithet used almost exclusively in Mahayana Buddhism. Many other Sri Lankan kings from the 3rd until the 15th century were also described as bodhisattas and their royal duties were sometimes clearly associated with the practice of the ten pāramitās. In some cases, they explicitly claimed to have received predictions of Buddhahood in past lives.

Popular Buddhist figures have also been seen as bodhisattvas in Theravada Buddhist lands. Shanta Ratnayaka notes that Anagarika Dharmapala, Asarapasarana Saranarikara Sangharaja, and Hikkaduwe Sri Sumamgala "are often called bodhisattvas". Buddhaghosa was also traditionally considered to be a reincarnation of Maitreya. Paul Williams writes that some modern Theravada meditation masters in Thailand are popularly regarded as bodhisattvas. Various modern figures of esoteric Theravada traditions (such as the weizzās of Burma) have also claimed to be bodhisattvas.

Theravada bhikkhu and scholar Walpola Rahula writes that the bodhisattva ideal has traditionally been held to be higher than the state of a śrāvaka not only in Mahayana but also in Theravada. Rahula writes "the fact is that both the Theravada and the Mahayana unanimously accept the Bodhisattva ideal as the highest...Although the Theravada holds that anybody can be a Bodhisattva, it does not stipulate or insist that all must be Bodhisattva which is considered not practical." He also quotes the 10th century king of Sri Lanka, Mahinda IV (956–972 CE), who had the words inscribed "none but the bodhisattvas will become kings of a prosperous Lanka," among other examples.

Jeffrey Samuels echoes this perspective, noting that while in Mahayana Buddhism the bodhisattva path is held to be universal and for everyone, in Theravada it is "reserved for and appropriated by certain exceptional people."

== Mahāyāna ==
=== Early Mahāyāna ===
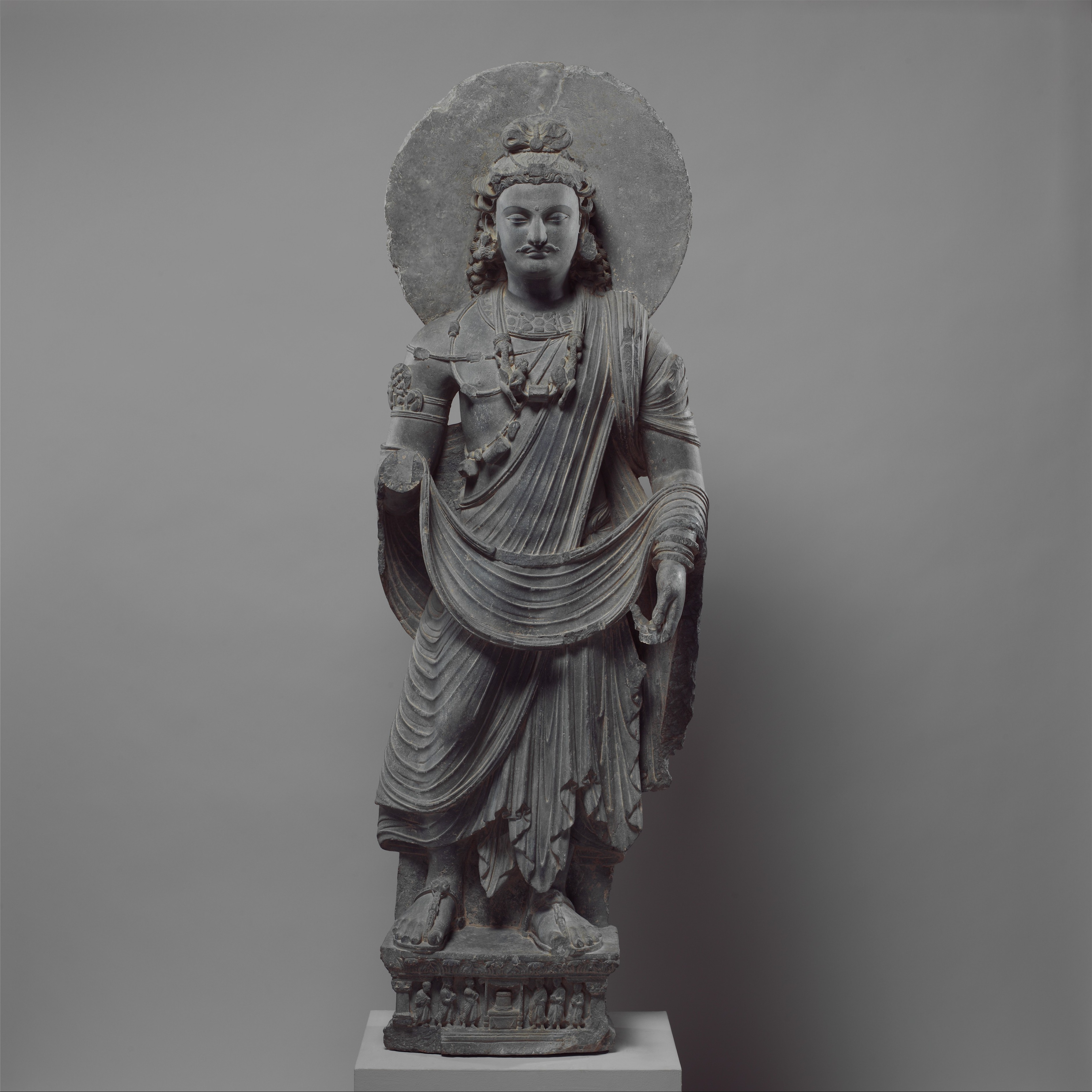
Greco-Buddhist standing Maitreya (3rd century), Metropolitan Museum of Art, New York

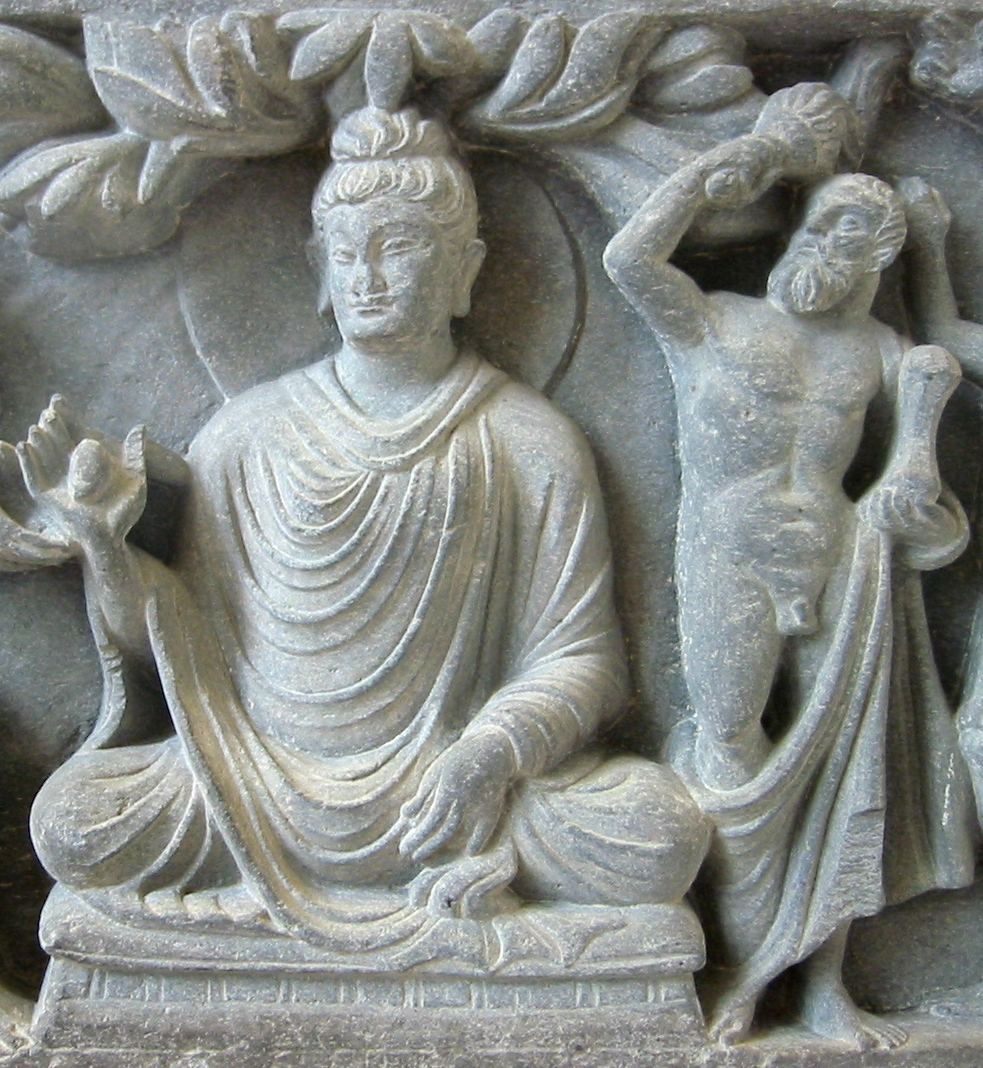
Greco-Buddhist Vajrapāni (the protector of the Buddha) resembling Heracles, second-century

Mahāyāna Buddhism (often also called Bodhisattvayāna, "Bodhisattva Vehicle") is based principally upon the path of a bodhisattva. This path was seen as higher and nobler than becoming an arhat or a solitary Buddha. Hayal notes that Sanskrit sources generally depict the bodhisattva path as reaching a higher goal (i.e. anuttara-samyak-sambodhi) than the goal of the path of the "disciples" (śrāvakas), which is the nirvana attained by arhats. For example, the Lotus Sutra states:

To the sravakas, he preached the doctrine which is associated with the four Noble Truths and leads to Dependent Origination. It aims at transcending birth, old age, disease, death, sorrow, lamentation, pain, distress of mind and weariness; and it ends in nirvana. But, to the great being, the bodhisattva, he preached the doctrine, which is associated with the six perfections and which ends in the Knowledge of the Omniscient One after the attainment of the supreme and perfect bodhi.

According to Peter Skilling, the Mahayana movement began when "at an uncertain point, let us say in the first century BCE, groups of monks, nuns, and lay-followers began to devote themselves exclusively to the Bodhisatva vehicle." These Mahayanists universalized the bodhisattvayana as a path which was open to everyone and which was taught for all beings to follow. This was in contrast to the Nikaya schools, which held that the bodhisattva path was only for a rare set of individuals. Indian Mahayanists preserved and promoted a set of texts called Vaipulya ("Extensive") sutras (later called Mahayana sutras).

Mahayana sources like the Lotus Sutra also claim that arhats that have reached nirvana have not truly finished their spiritual quest, for they still have not attained the superior goal of sambodhi (Buddhahood) and thus must continue to strive until they reach this goal.

The Aṣṭasāhasrikā Prajñāpāramitā Sūtra, one of the earliest known Mahayana texts, contains a simple and brief definition for the term bodhisattva, which is also the earliest known Mahāyāna definition. This definition is given as the following: "Because he has bodhi as his aim, a bodhisattva-mahāsattva is so called."

Mahayana sutras also depict the bodhisattva as a being which, because they want to reach Buddhahood for the sake of all beings, is more loving and compassionate than the sravaka (who only wishes to end their own suffering). Thus, another major difference between the bodhisattva and the arhat is that the bodhisattva practices the path for the good of others (par-ārtha), due to their bodhicitta, while the sravakas do so for their own good (sv-ārtha) and thus, do not have bodhicitta (which is compassionately focused on others).

Mahayana bodhisattvas were not just abstract models for Buddhist practice, but also developed as distinct figures which were venerated by Indian Buddhists. These included figures like Manjushri and Avalokiteshvara, which are personifications of the basic virtues of wisdom and compassion respectively and are the two most important bodhisattvas in Mahayana. The development of bodhisattva devotion parallels the development of the Hindu bhakti movement. Indeed, Dayal sees the development of Indian bodhisattva cults as a Buddhist reaction to the growth of bhakti centered religion in India which helped to popularize and reinvigorate Indian Buddhism.

Some Mahayana sutras promoted another revolutionary doctrinal turn, claiming that the three vehicles of the Śrāvakayāna, Pratyekabuddhayāna and the Bodhisattvayāna were really just one vehicle (ekayana). This is most famously promoted in the Lotus Sūtra which claims that the very idea of three separate vehicles is just an upaya, a skillful device invented by the Buddha to get beings of various abilities on the path. But ultimately, it will be revealed to them that there is only one vehicle, the ekayana, which ends in Buddhahood.

=== Mature scholastic Mahāyāna ===
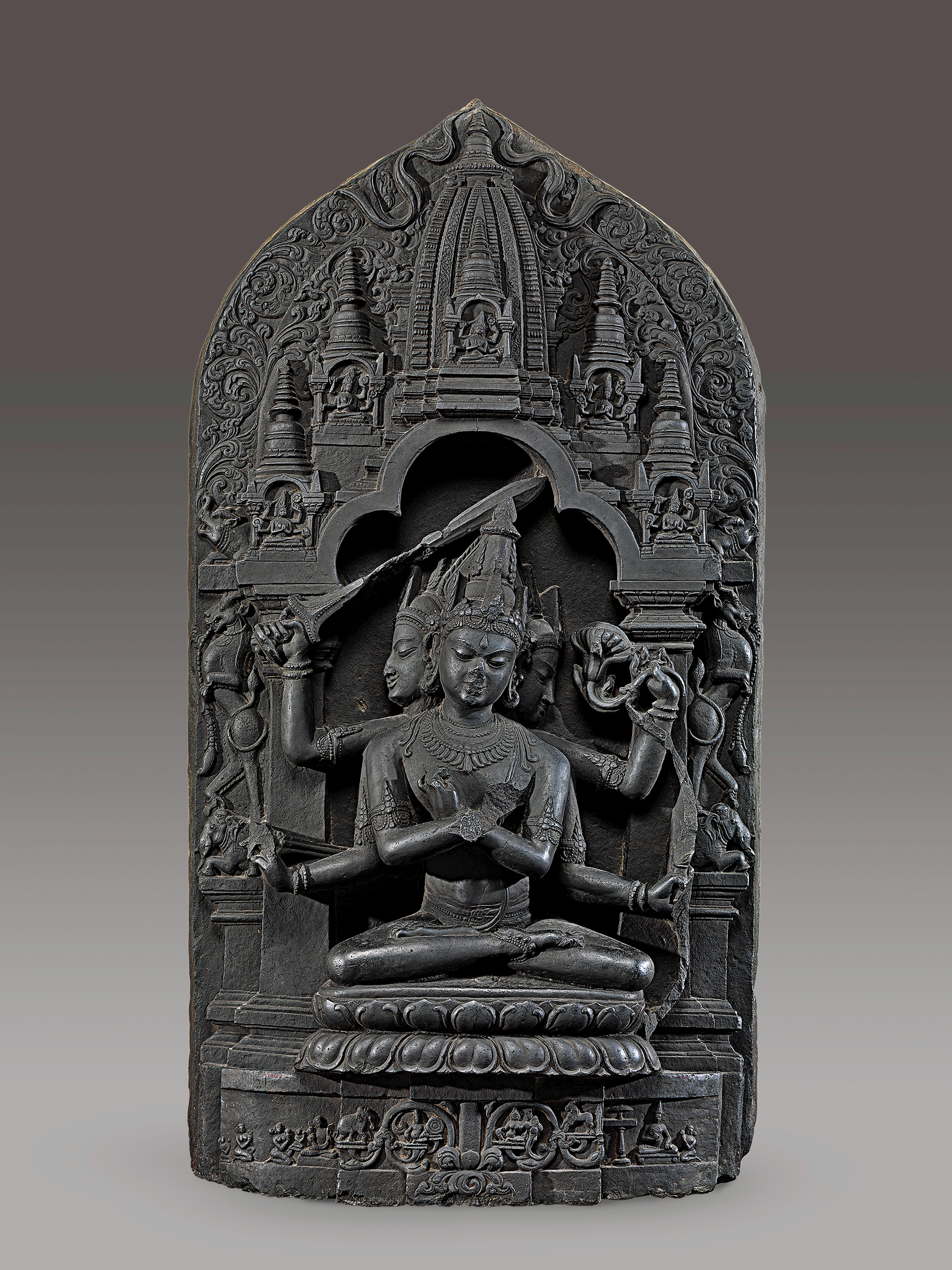
Bengali Sculpture of Manjushri, the bodhisattva of wisdom, 11th century

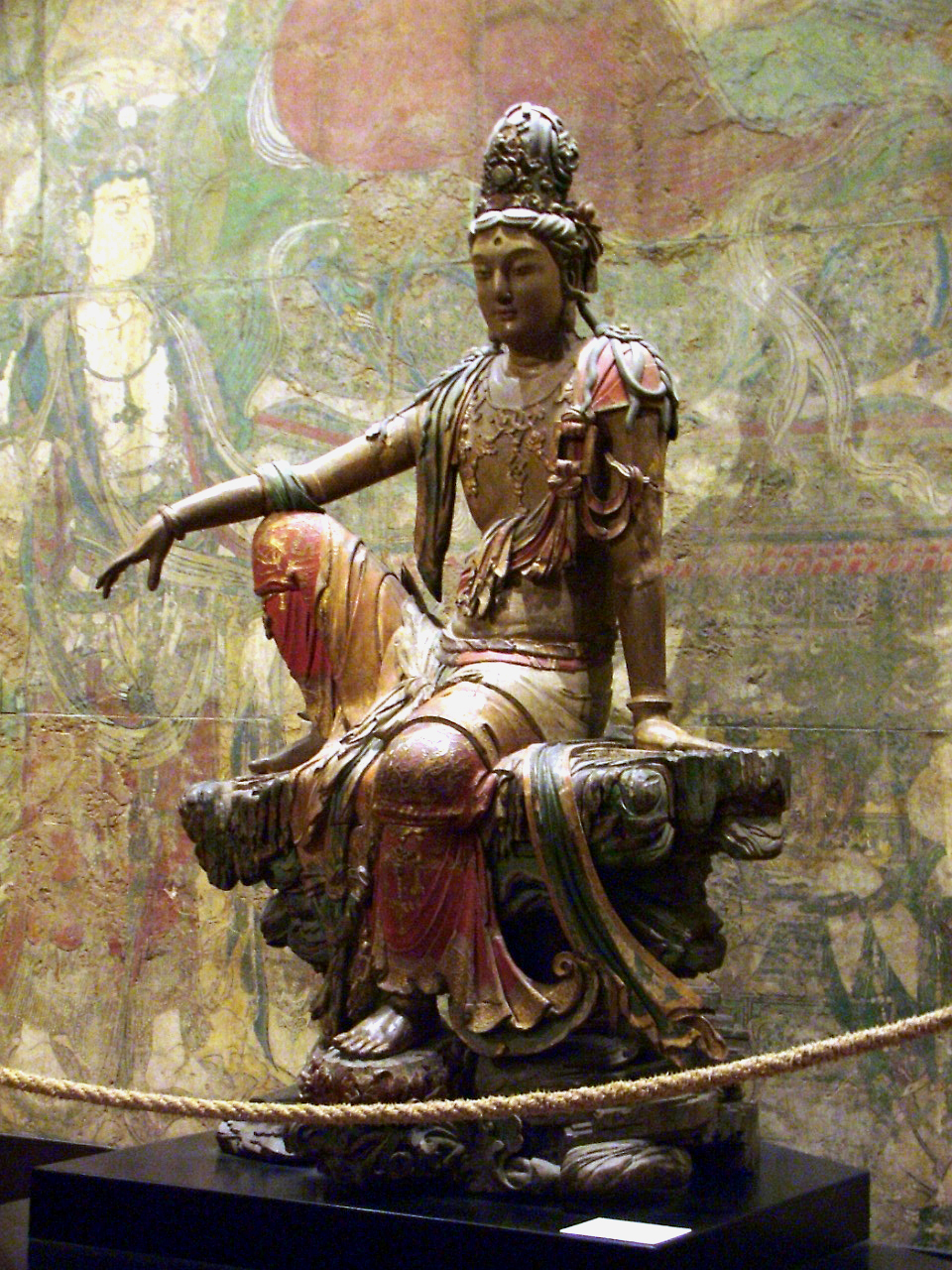
Wood carving of Guanyin (the East Asian form of Avalokiteśvara). Liao China, 907–1125

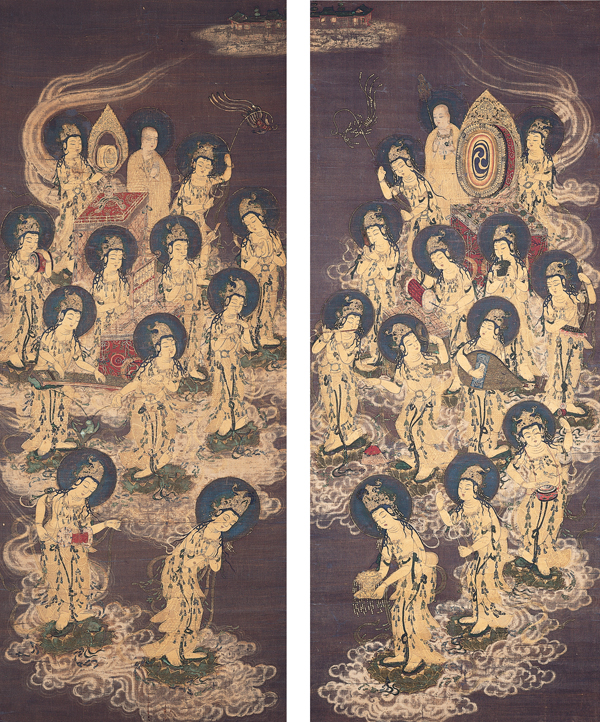
Twenty-five Bodhisattvas Descending from Heaven. Japanese painting, c. 1300

Classical Indian mahayanists held that the only sutras which teach the bodhisattva vehicle are the Mahayana sutras. Thus, Nagarjuna writes "the subjects based on the deeds of Bodhisattvas were not mentioned in [non-Mahāyāna] sūtras." They also held that the bodhisattva path was superior to the śrāvaka vehicle and so the bodhisattva vehicle is the "great vehicle" (mahayana) due to its greater aspiration to save others, while the śrāvaka vehicle is the "small" or "inferior" vehicle (hinayana). Thus, Asanga argues in his Mahāyānasūtrālaṃkāra that the two vehicles differ in numerous ways, such as intention, teaching, employment (i.e., means), support, and the time that it takes to reach the goal.

Over time, Mahayana Buddhists developed mature systematized doctrines about the bodhisattva. The authors of the various Madhyamaka treatises often presented the view of the ekayana, and thus held that all beings can become bodhisattvas. The texts and sutras associated with the Yogacara school developed a different theory of three separate gotras (families, lineages), that inherently predisposed a person to either the vehicle of the arhat, pratyekabuddha or samyak-saṃbuddha (fully self-awakened one). For the yogacarins then, only some beings (those who have the "bodhisattva lineage") can enter the bodhisattva path. In East Asian Buddhism, the view of the one vehicle (ekayana) which holds that all Buddhist teachings are really part of a single path, is the standard view.

The term bodhisattva was also used in a broader sense by later authors. According to the eighth-century Mahāyāna philosopher Haribhadra, the term "bodhisattva" can refer to those who follow any of the three vehicles, since all are working towards bodhi. Therefore, the specific term for a Mahāyāna bodhisattva is a mahāsattva (great being) bodhisattva. According to Atiśa's 11th century Bodhipathapradīpa, the central defining feature of a Mahāyāna bodhisattva is the universal aspiration to end suffering for all sentient beings, which is termed bodhicitta (the mind set on awakening).

The bodhisattva doctrine went through a significant transformation during the development of Buddhist tantra, also known as Vajrayana. This movement developed new ideas and texts which introduced new bodhisattvas and re-interpreted old ones in new forms, developed in elaborate mandalas for them and introduced new practices which made use of mantras, mudras and other tantric elements.

=== Entering the bodhisattva path ===
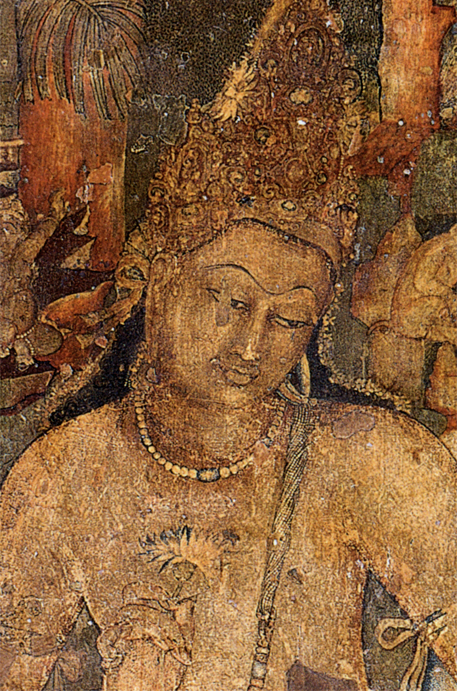
Mural of bodhisattva Padmapani in Ajanta Caves. India, 5th century

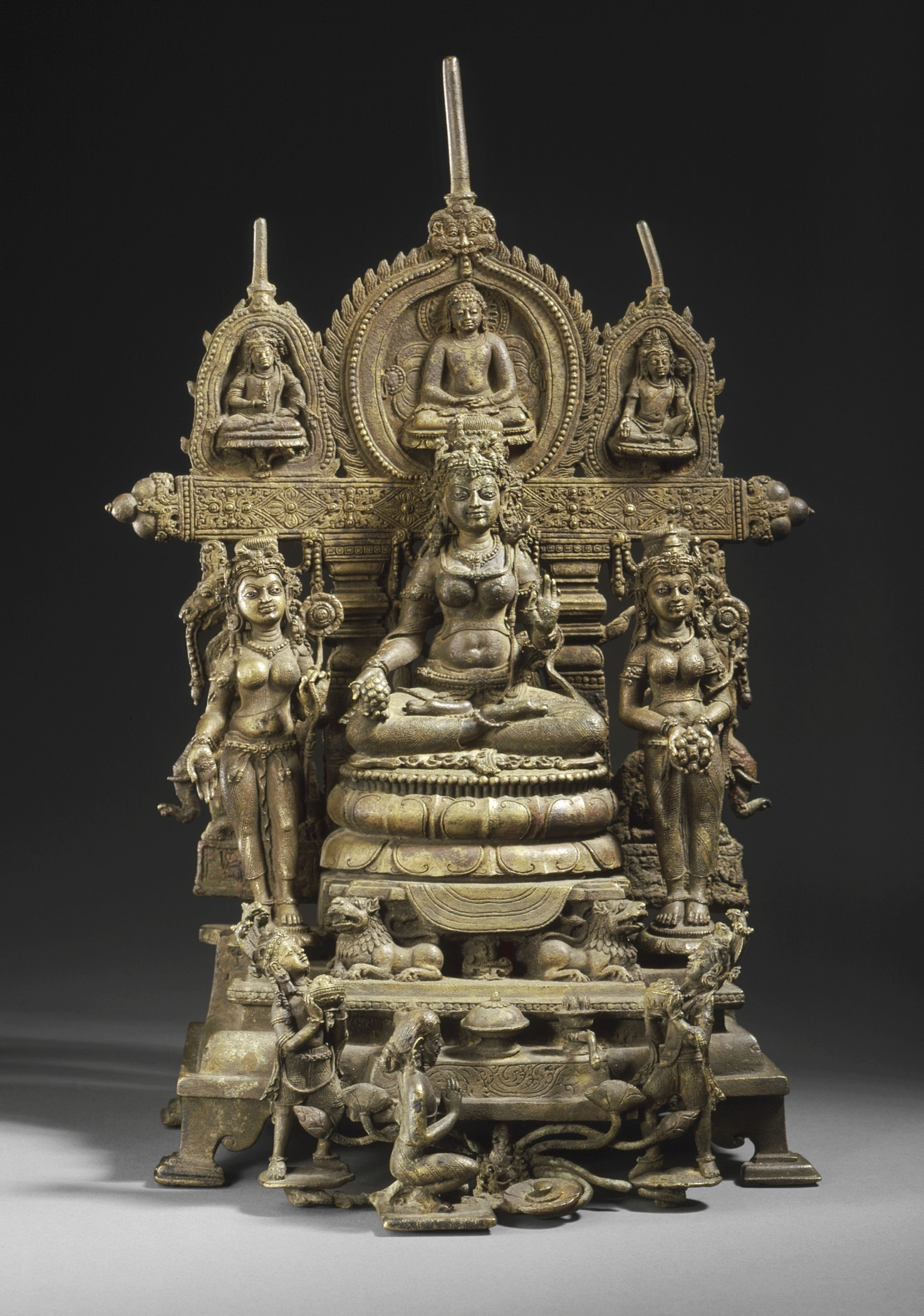
Green Tara attended by White Tara and Bhrikuti, India, Madhya Pradesh, Sirpur, c. 8th century

According to David Drewes, "Mahayana sutras unanimously depict the path beginning with the first arising of the thought of becoming a Buddha (prathamacittotpāda), or the initial arising of bodhicitta, typically aeons before one first receives a Buddha's prediction, and apply the term bodhisattva from this point." The Ten Stages Sutra, for example, explains that the arising of bodhicitta is the first step in the bodhisattva's career. Thus, the arising of bodhicitta, the compassionate mind aimed at awakening for the sake of all beings, is a central defining element of the bodhisattva path.

Another key element of the bodhisattva path is the concept of a bodhisattva's praṇidhāna - which can mean a resolution, resolve, vow, prayer, wish, aspiration and determination. This more general idea of an earnest wish or solemn resolve which is closely connected with bodhicitta (and is the cause and result of bodhicitta) eventually developed into the idea that bodhisattvas take certain formulaic "bodhisattva vows." One of the earliest of these formulas is found in the Aṣṭasāhasrikā Prajñāpāramitā Sūtra and states:

We having crossed (the stream of samsara), may we help living beings to cross! We being liberated, may we liberate others! We being comforted, may we comfort others! We being finally released, may we release others!

Other sutras contain longer and more complex formulas, such as the ten vows found in the Ten Stages Sutra.

Mahayana sources also discuss the importance of a Buddha's prediction (vyākaraṇa) of a bodhisattva's future Buddhahood. This is seen as an important step along the bodhisattva path.

Later Mahayana Buddhists also developed specific rituals and devotional acts for which helped to develop various preliminary qualities, such as faith, worship, prayer, and confession, that lead to the arising of bodhicitta. These elements, which constitute a kind of preliminary preparation for bodhicitta, are found in the "seven part worship" (saptāṅgavidhi, saptāṇgapūjā or saptavidhā anuttarapūjā). This ritual form is visible in the works of Shantideva (8th century) and includes:

- Vandana (obeisance, bowing down)
- Puja (worship of the Buddhas)
- Sarana-gamana (going for refuge)
- Papadesana (confession of bad deeds)
- Punyanumodana (rejoicing in merit of the good deeds of oneself and others)
- Adhyesana (prayer, entreaty) and yacana (supplication) – request to Buddhas and Bodhisattvas to continue preaching Dharma
- Atmabhavadi-parityagah (surrender) and pariṇāmanā (the transfer of one's Merit to the welfare of others)

After these preliminaries have been accomplished, then the aspirant is seen as being ready to give rise to bodhicitta, often through the recitation of a bodhisattva vow. Contemporary Mahāyāna Buddhism encourages everyone to give rise to bodhicitta and ceremonially take bodhisattva vows. With these vows and precepts, one makes the promise to work for the complete enlightenment of all sentient beings by practicing the transcendent virtues or paramitas.

In Mahāyāna, bodhisattvas are often not Buddhist monks and are former lay practitioners.

=== Bodhisattva conduct (caryā) ===
After a being has entered the path by giving rise to bodhicitta, they must make effort in the practice or conduct (caryā) of the bodhisattvas, which includes all the duties, virtues and practices that bodhisattvas must accomplish to attain Buddhahood. An important early Mahayana source for the practice of the bodhisattva is the Bodhisattvapiṭaka sūtra, a major sutra found in the Mahāratnakūṭa collection which was widely cited by various sources. According to Ulrich Pagel, this text is "one of the longest works on the bodhisattva in Mahayana literature" and thus provides extensive information on the topic of bodhisattva training, especially the perfections (pāramitā). Pagel also argues that this text was quite influential on later Mahayana writings which discuss the bodhisattva and thus was "of fundamental importance to the evolution of the bodhisattva doctrine." Other sutras in the Mahāratnakūṭa collection are also important sources for the bodhisattva path.

According to Pagel, the basic outline of the bodhisattva practice in the Bodhisattvapiṭaka is outlined in a passage which states "the path to enlightenment comprises benevolence towards all sentient beings, striving after the perfections and compliance with the means of conversion." This path begins with contemplating the failures of samsara, developing faith in the Buddha, giving rise to bodhicitta and practicing the four immesurables. It then proceeds through all six perfections and finally discusses the four means of converting sentient beings (saṃgrahavastu). The path is presented through prose exposition, mnemonic lists (matrka) and also through Jataka narratives. Using this general framework, the Bodhisattvapiṭaka incorporates discussions related to other practices including super knowledge (abhijñā), learning, 'skill' (kauśalya), accumulation of merit (puṇyasaṃbhāra), the thirty-seven factors of awakening (bodhipakṣadharmas), perfect mental quietude (śamatha) and insight (vipaśyanā).

Later Mahayana treatises (śāstras) like the Bodhisattvabhumi and the Mahāyānasūtrālamkāra provide the following schema of bodhisattva practices:

- Bodhipakṣa-caryā, the practice of the 37 bodhipakṣadharmas (the principles conducive to bodhi) which are: the four applications of mindfulness, the four right efforts, the four bases of spiritual power, the five spiritual faculties, the five strengths, the seven factors of awakening and the noble eightfold path.
- Abhijñā-caryā, the practice of the super-knowledges (which are mainly developed in order to convert, help and guide others).
- Pāramitā-caryā, the practice of the perfections, which are: Dāna (generosity), Śīla (virtue, ethics), Kṣānti (patient endurance), Vīrya (heroic energy), Dhyāna (meditation), Prajñā (wisdom), Upāya (skillful means), Praṇidhāna (vow, resolve), Bala (spiritual power), and Jñāna (knowledge).
- Sattvaparipāka-caryā, the practice of maturing the living beings, i.e. preaching and teaching others.

The first six perfections (pāramitās) are the most significant and popular set of bodhisattva virtues and thus they serve as a central framework for bodhisattva practice. They are the most widely taught and commented upon virtues throughout the history of Mahayana Buddhist literature and feature prominently in major Sanskrit sources such as the Bodhisattvabhumi, the Mahāyānasūtrālamkāra, the King of Samadhis Sutra and the Ten Stages Sutra. They are extolled and praised by these sources as "the great oceans of all the bright virtues and auspicious principles" (Bodhisattvabhumi) and "the Teacher, the Way and the Light...the Refuge and the Shelter, the Support and the Sanctuary" (Aṣṭasāhasrikā).

While many Mahayana sources discuss the bodhisattva's training in ethical discipline (śīla) in classic Buddhist terms, over time, there also developed specific sets of ethical precepts for bodhisattvas (Skt. bodhisattva-śīla). These various sets of precepts are usually taken by bodhisattva aspirants (lay and ordained monastics) along with classic Buddhist pratimoksha precepts. However, in some Japanese Buddhist traditions, monastics rely solely on the bodhisattva precepts.

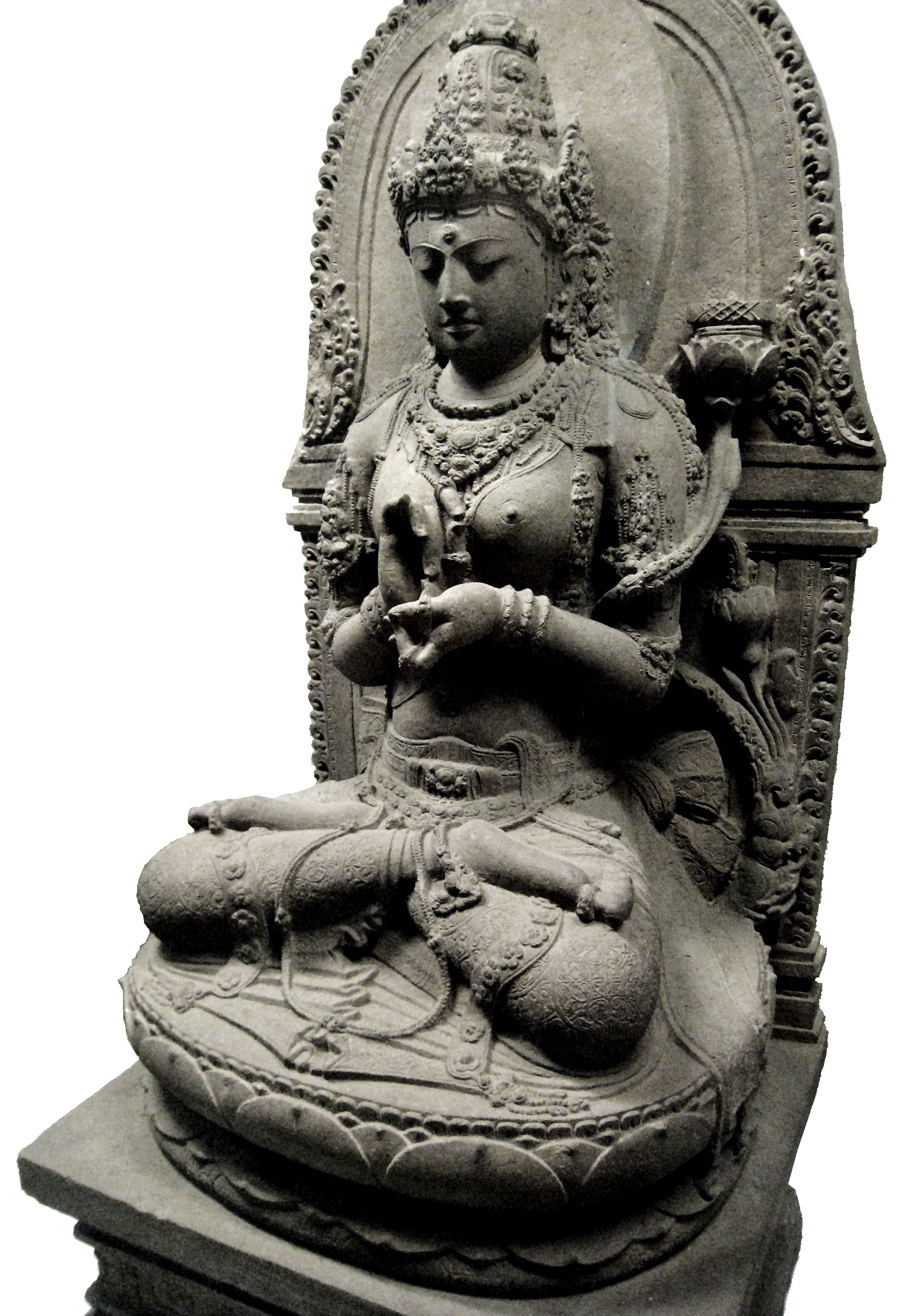
Bodhisattva Prajñaparamita, a female personification of the perfection of wisdom, Singhasari period, East Java, Indonesia, 13th century

The perfection of wisdom (prajñāpāramitā) is generally seen as the most important and primary of the perfections, without which all the others fall short. Thus, the Madhyamakavatara (6:2) states that wisdom leads the other perfections as a man with eyes leads the blind. This perfect or transcendent wisdom has various qualities, such as being non-attached (asakti), non-conceptual and non-dual (advaya) and signless (animitta). It is generally understood as a kind of insight into the true nature of all phenomena (dharmas) which in Mahayana sutras is widely described as emptiness (shunyatā).

Another key virtue which the bodhisattva must develop is great compassion (mahā-karuṇā), a vast sense of care aimed at ending the suffering of all sentient beings. This great compassion is the ethical foundation of the bodhisattva, and it is also an applied aspect of their bodhicitta. Great compassion must also be closely joined with the perfection of wisdom, which reveals that all the beings that the bodhisattva strives to save are ultimately empty of self (anātman) and lack inherent existence (niḥsvabhāva). Due to the bodhisattva's compassionate wish to save all beings, they develop innumerable skillful means or strategies (upaya) with which to teach and guide different kinds of beings with all sorts of different inclinations and tendencies.

Another key virtue for the bodhisattva is mindfulness (smṛti), which Dayal calls "the sine qua non of moral progress for a bodhisattva." Mindfulness is widely emphasized by Buddhist authors and Sanskrit sources and it appears four times in the list of 37 bodhipakṣadharmas. According to the Aṣṭasāhasrikā, a bodhisattva must never lose mindfulness so as not to be confused or distracted. The Mahāyānasūtrālamkāra states that mindfulness is the principal asset of a bodhisattva, while both Asvaghosa and Shantideva state that without mindfulness, a bodhisattva will be helpless and uncontrolled (like a mad elephant) and will not succeed in conquering the mental afflictions.

=== Length and nature of the path ===
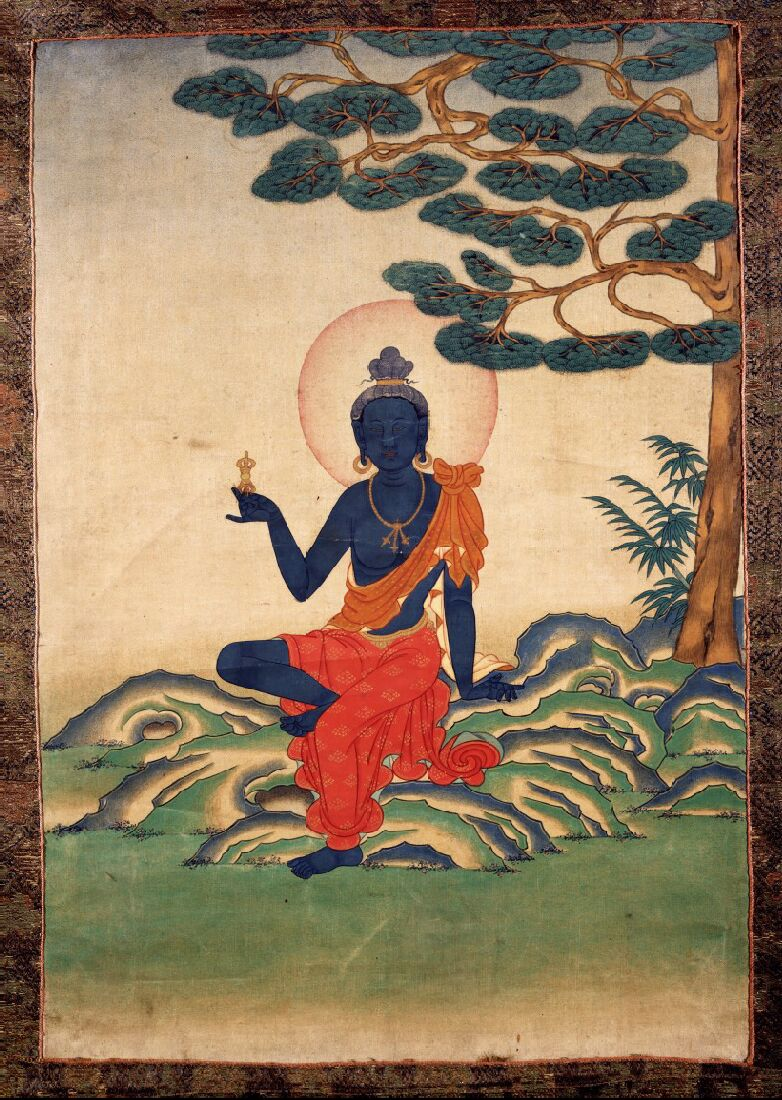
Tibetan painting of Vajrapani, 19th-century

Just as with non-Mahayana sources, Mahayana sutras generally depict the bodhisattva path as a long path that takes many lifetimes across many aeons. Some sutras state that a beginner bodhisattva could take anywhere from 3 to 22 countless eons (mahāsaṃkhyeya kalpas) to become a Buddha. The Mahāyānasaṃgraha of Asanga states that the bodhisattva must cultivate the six paramitas for three incalculable aeons (kalpāsaṃkhyeya). Shantideva meanwhile states that bodhisattvas must practice each perfection for sixty aeons or kalpas and also declares that a bodhisattva must practice the path for an "inconceivable" (acintya) number of kalpas. Thus, the bodhisattva path could take many billions upon billions of years to complete.

Later developments in Indian and Asian Mahayana Buddhism (especially in Vajrayana or tantric Buddhism) lead to the idea that certain methods and practices could substantially shorten the path (and even lead to Buddhahood in a single lifetime). In Pure Land Buddhism, an aspirant might go to a Buddha's pure land or buddha-field (buddhakṣetra), like Sukhavati, where they can study the path directly with a Buddha. This could significantly shorten the length of the path, or at least make it more bearable. East Asian Pure Land Buddhist traditions, such as Jōdo-shū and Jōdo Shinshū, hold the view that realizing Buddhahood through the long bodhisattva path of the perfections is no longer practical in the current age (which is understood as a degenerate age called mappo). Thus, they rely on the salvific power of Amitabha to bring Buddhist practitioners to the pure land of Sukhavati, where they will better be able to practice the path.

This view is rejected by other schools such as Tendai, Shingon and Zen. The founders of Tendai and Shingon, Saicho and Kukai, held that anyone who practiced the path properly could reach awakening in this very lifetime. Buddhist schools like Tiantai, Huayan, Chan and the various Vajrayāna traditions maintain that they teach ways to attain Buddhahood within one lifetime.

Some of early depictions of the Bodhisattva path in texts such as the Ugraparipṛcchā Sūtra describe it as an arduous, difficult monastic path suited only for the few which is nevertheless the most glorious path one can take. Three kinds of bodhisattvas are mentioned: the forest, city, and monastery bodhisattvas—with forest dwelling being promoted a superior, even necessary path in sutras such as the Ugraparipṛcchā and the Samadhiraja sutras. The early Rastrapalapariprccha sutra also promotes a solitary life of meditation in the forests, far away from the distractions of the householder life. The Rastrapala is also highly critical of monks living in monasteries and in cities who are seen as not practicing meditation and morality.

The Ratnagunasamcayagatha also says the bodhisattva should undertake ascetic practices (dhūtaguṇa), "wander freely without a home", practice the paramitas and train under a guru in order to perfect his meditation practice and realization of prajñaparamita. The twelve dhūtaguṇas are also promoted by the King of Samadhis Sutra, the Ten Stages Sutra and Shantideva. Some scholars have used these texts to argue for "the forest hypothesis", the theory that the initial Bodhisattva ideal was associated with a strict forest asceticism. But other scholars point out that many other Mahayana sutras do not promote this ideal, and instead teach "easy" practices like memorizing, reciting, teaching and copying Mahayana sutras, as well as meditating on Buddhas and bodhisattvas (and reciting or chanting their names). Ulrich Pagel also notes that in numerous sutras found in the Mahāratnakūṭa collection, the bodhisattva ideal is placed "firmly within the reach of non-celibate layfolk."

=== Nirvana ===
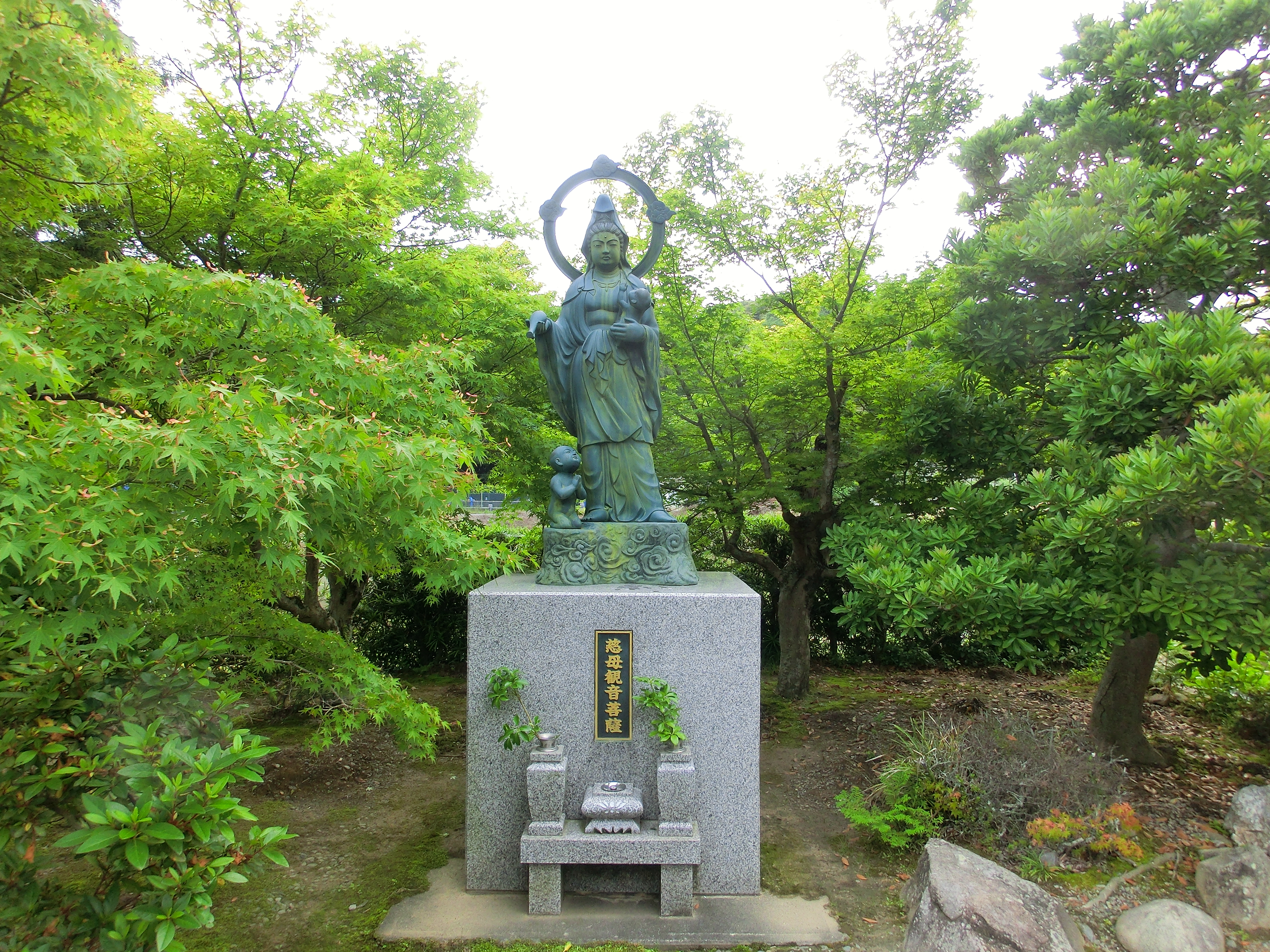
Japanese statue of Kannon (Guanyin, a popular female form of Avalokiteshvara in East Asia)

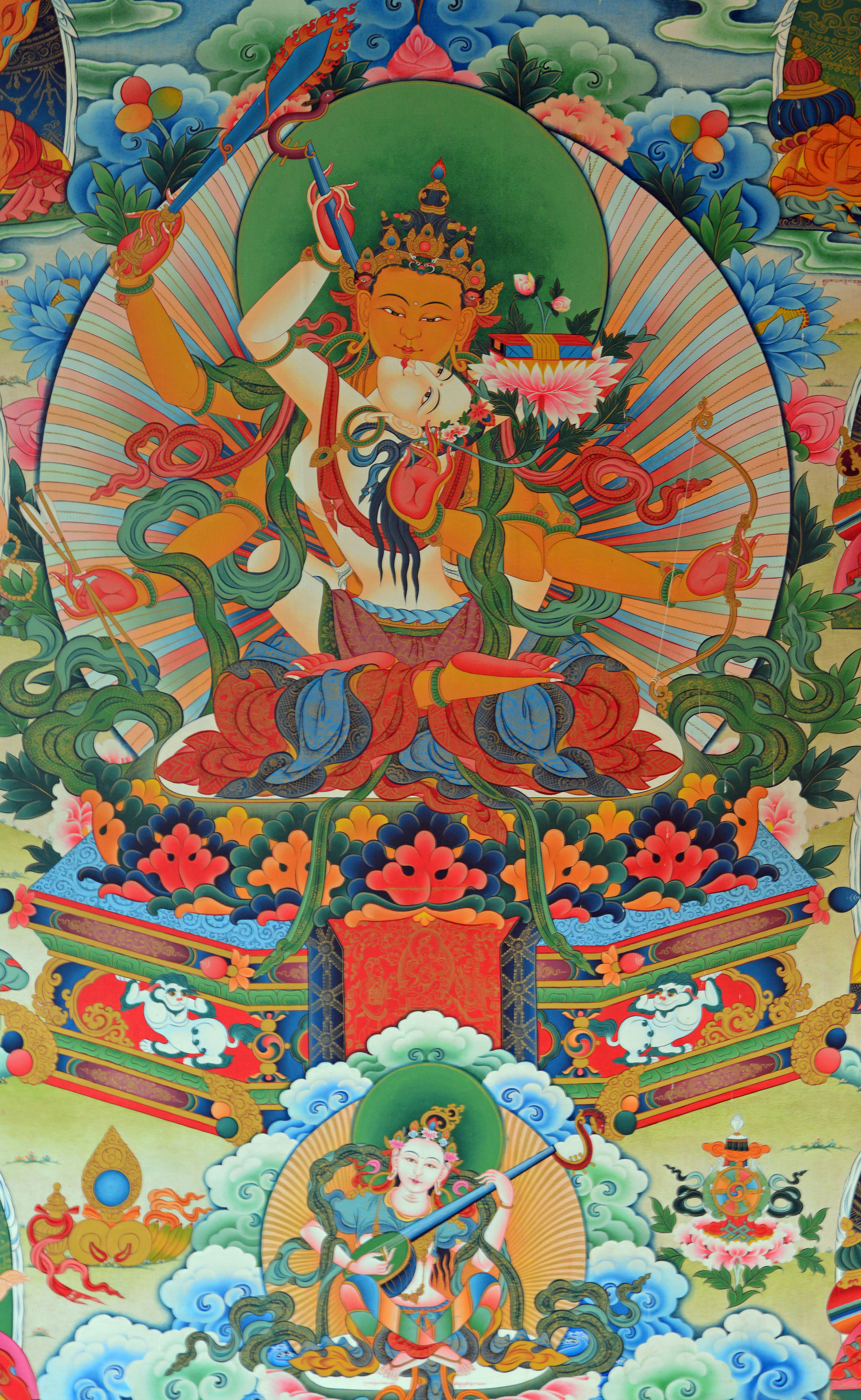
Mural painting of Manjushri in tantric union with his consort, the bodhisattva Sarasvati (also considered to be a form of Tara)

Related to the different views on the different types of yanas or vehicles is the question of a bodhisattva's relationship to nirvāṇa. In the various Mahāyāna texts, two theories can be discerned. One view is the idea that a bodhisattva must postpone their awakening until full Buddhahood is attained (at which point one ceases to be reborn, which is the classical view of nirvāṇa). This view is promoted in some sutras like the Pañcavimsatisahasrika-prajñaparamita-sutra. The idea is also found in the Laṅkāvatāra Sūtra, which mentions that bodhisattvas take the following vow: "I shall not enter into final nirvana before all beings have been liberated." Likewise, the Śikṣāsamuccaya states "I must lead all beings to Liberation. I will stay here till the end, even for the sake of one living soul."

The second theory is the idea that there are two kinds of nirvāṇa, the nirvāṇa of an arhat and a superior type of nirvāṇa called apratiṣṭhita (non-abiding) that allows a Buddha to remain engaged in the samsaric realms without being affected by them. This attainment was understood as a kind of non-dual state in which one is neither limited to samsara nor nirvana. A being who has reached this kind of nirvana is not restricted from manifesting in the samsaric realms, and yet they remain fully detached from the defilements found in these realms (and thus they can help others).

This doctrine of non-abiding nirvana developed in the Yogacara school. As noted by Paul Williams, the idea of apratiṣṭhita nirvāṇa may have taken some time to develop and is not obvious in some of the early Mahāyāna literature, therefore while earlier sutras may sometimes speak of "postponement", later texts saw no need to postpone the "superior" apratiṣṭhita nirvāṇa.

In this Yogacara model, the bodhisattva definitely rejects and avoids the liberation of the śravaka and pratyekabuddha, described in Mahāyāna literature as either inferior or "hina" (as in Asaṅga's fourth century Yogācārabhūmi) or as ultimately false or illusory (as in the Lotus Sūtra). That a bodhisattva has the option to pursue such a lesser path, but instead chooses the long path towards Buddhahood is one of the five criteria for one to be considered a bodhisattva. The other four are: being human, being a man, making a vow to become a Buddha in the presence of a previous Buddha, and receiving a prophecy from that Buddha.

Over time, a more varied analysis of bodhisattva careers developed focused on one's motivation. This can be seen in the Tibetan Buddhist teaching on three types of motivation for generating bodhicitta. According to Patrul Rinpoche's 19th-century Words of My Perfect Teacher (Kun bzang bla ma'i gzhal lung), a bodhisattva might be motivated in one of three ways. They are:

1. King-like bodhicitta – To aspire to become a Buddha first in order to then help sentient beings.
2. Boatman-like bodhicitta – To aspire to become a Buddha at the same time as other sentient beings.
3. Shepherd-like bodhicitta – To aspire to become a Buddha only after all other sentient beings have done so.

These three are not types of people, but rather types of motivation. According to Patrul Rinpoche, the third quality of intention is most noble though the mode by which Buddhahood occurs is the first; that is, it is only possible to teach others the path to enlightenment once one has attained enlightenment oneself.

=== Bodhisattva stages ===
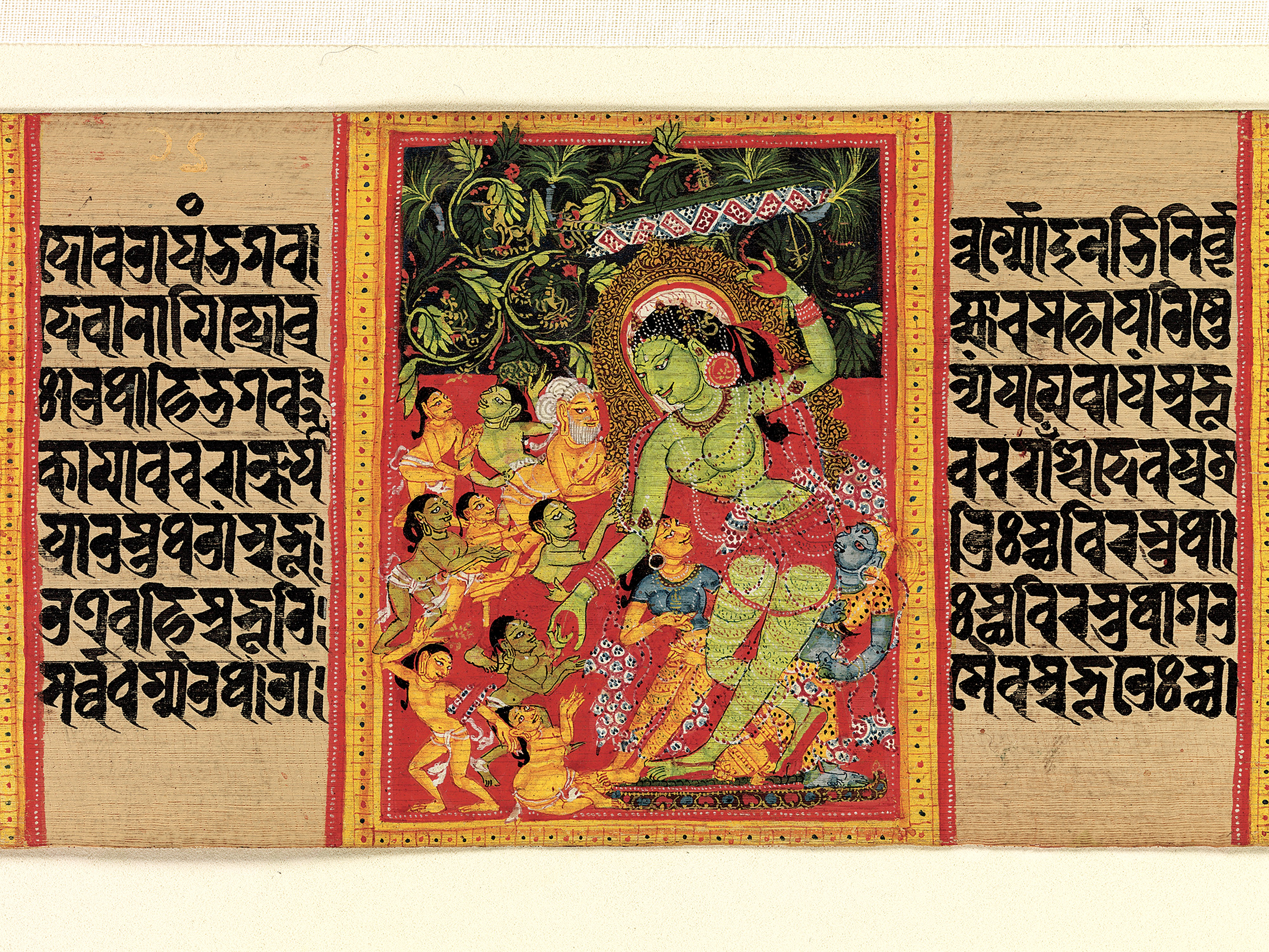
Green Tara and her devotees, Folio from a Bengali manuscript of the Aṣṭasāhasrikā Prajñāpāramitā (Perfection of Wisdom in Eight Thousand Lines), MET

According to James B. Apple, if one studies the earliest textual materials which discuss the bodhisattva path (which includes the translations of Lokakshema and the Gandharan manuscripts), "one finds four key stages that are demarcated throughout this early textual material that constitute the most basic elements in the path of a bodhisattva". These main elements are:

1. "The arising of the thought of awakening (bodhicittotpāda), when a person first aspires to attain the state of Buddhahood and thereby becomes a bodhisattva"
2. "Endurance towards the fact that things are not produced" (anutpattikadharma-kṣānti), which in various sources also entails non-retrogression.
3. "The attainment of the status of irreversibility" or non-retrogression (avaivartika) from Buddhahood, which means one is close to Buddhahood and that one can no longer turn back or regress from that attainment. They are exemplary monks, with cognitive powers equal to arhats. They practice the four dhyanas, have a deep knowledge of perfect wisdom and teach it to others. In the Lokakshema's Chinese translation of the Aṣṭasāhasrikā, the Daoxing Banruo Jing, this stage is closely related to a concentration (samadhi) that "does not grasp at anything at all" (sarvadharmāparigṛhīta).
4. The prediction (vyākaraṇa), "the event when a Buddha predicts the time and place of a bodhisattva's subsequent awakening." The prediction is directly associated with the status of irreversibility. The Daoxing Banruo Jing states: "all the bodhisattvas who have realized the irreversible stage have obtained their prediction to Buddhahood from the Buddhas in the past."

According to Drewes, the Aṣṭasāhasrikā Prajñāpāramitā Sūtra divides the bodhisattva path into three main stages. The first stage is that of bodhisattvas who "first set out in the vehicle" (prathamayānasaṃprasthita), then there is the "irreversible" (avinivartanīya) stage, and finally the third "bound by one more birth" (ekajātipratibaddha), as in, destined to become a Buddha in the next life. Lamotte also mentions four similar stages of the bodhiattva career which are found in the Dazhidulun translated by Kumarajiva: (1) Prathamacittotpādika ("who produces the mind of Bodhi for the first time"), (2) Ṣaṭpāramitācaryāpratipanna ("devoted to the practice of the six perfections"), (3) Avinivartanīya (non-regression), (4) Ekajātipratibaddha ("separated by only one lifetime from buddhahood").

Drewes notes that Mahāyāna sūtras mainly depict a bodhisattvas' first arising of bodhicitta as occurring in the presence of a Buddha. Furthermore, according to Drewes, most Mahāyāna sūtras "never encourage anyone to become a bodhisattva or present any ritual or other means of doing so." In a similar manner to the nikāya sources, Mahāyāna sūtras also see new bodhisattvas as likely to regress, while seeing irreversible bodhisattvas are quite rare. Thus, according to Drewes, "the Aṣṭasāhasrikā, for instance, states that as many bodhisattvas as there grains of sand in the Ganges turn back from the pursuit of Buddhahood and that out of innumerable beings who give rise to bodhicitta and progress toward Buddhahood, only one or two will reach the point of becoming irreversible."

Drewes also adds that early texts like the Aṣṭasāhasrikā treat bodhisattvas who are beginners (ādikarmika) or "not long set out in the [great] vehicle" with scorn, describing them as "blind", "unintelligent", "lazy" and "weak". Early Mahayana works identify them with those who reject Mahayana or who abandon Mahayana, and they are seen as likely to become śrāvakas (those on the arhat path). Rather than encouraging them to become bodhisattvas, what early Mahayana sutras like the Aṣṭa do is to help individuals determine if they have already received a prediction in a past life, or if they are close to this point.

The Aṣṭa provides a variety of methods, including forms of ritual or divination, methods dealing with dreams and various tests, especially tests based on one's reaction to the hearing of the content in the Aṣṭasāhasrikā itself. The text states that encountering and accepting its teachings mean one is close to being given a prediction and that if one does not "shrink back, cower or despair" from the text, but "firmly believes it", one is either irreversible or is close to this stage. Many other Mahayana sutras such as the Akṣobhyavyūha, Vimalakīrtinirdeśa, Sukhāvatīvyūha, and the Śūraṃgamasamādhi Sūtra present textual approaches to determine one's status as an advanced bodhisattva. These mainly depend on a person's attitude towards listening to, believing, preaching, proclaiming, copying or memorizing and reciting the sutra as well as practicing the sutra's teachings.

According to Drewes, this claim that merely having faith in Mahāyāna sūtras meant that one was an advanced bodhisattva, was a departure from previous Nikaya views about bodhisattvas. It created new groups of Buddhists who accepted each other's bodhisattva status. Some Mahayana texts are more open with their bodhisattva doctrine. The Lotus Sutra famously assures large numbers people that they will certainly achieve Buddhahood, with few requirements (other than hearing and accepting the Lotus Sutra itself).

==== Avaivartika (non-retrogression) ====
The term avaivartika refers to the stage in Buddhist practice where a practitioner reaches a point of irreversibility, ensuring that they will not regress in their spiritual progress. Alternative Sanskrit forms include avivartika, avinivartanīya and avaivartyabhūmi. Attaining this state guarantees that the practitioner remains steadfast on the path to enlightenment and will not abandon their aspirations or regress to a lower stage of realization.

Within the framework of the Bodhisattva path, various Buddhist scriptures identify different stages at which non-retrogression is attained. Some sources associate it with the path of preparation (prayogamārga), where a bodhisattva solidifies their commitment and will no longer turn back to pursue the path of an arhat. Others link it to the first bhūmi (stage) of the bodhisattva path or, in later systematic presentations, to the eighth bhūmi, after which full Buddhahood becomes inevitable.

The concept of avaivartika appears in early Mahāyāna texts such as the Mahāprajñāpāramitāśāstra, which distinguishes between bodhisattvas who are prone to regression (vaivartika) and those who are not (avaivartika). True bodhisattvas are those who have transcended the possibility of falling back, while those who remain susceptible to regression are considered bodhisattvas only in a nominal sense.

The Aṣṭasāhasrikā Prajñāpāramitā Sūtra, particularly in its early Chinese translation by Lokakṣema, emphasizes avaivartika as a pivotal attainment. It describes how the bodhisattva, upon reaching the state of anutpattikadharmakṣānti (the realization of the unborn nature of phenomena), becomes irreversible in their journey toward complete enlightenment. Unlike later Mahāyāna texts, which integrate this stage within the structured bhūmi system, Lokakṣema's version presents it more fluidly, portraying the avaivartin as one of a few key categories of bodhisattvas.

In Pure Land traditions, rebirth in Amitābha Buddha's Pure Land (Sukhāvatī) is equated with entering the stage of non-retrogression. It is believed that those who attain birth in Sukhāvatī are assured of progressing toward enlightenment without the risk of falling back into lower states of existence.

The attainment of avaivartika is often associated with the bodhisattva's ability to inspire and lead countless beings toward liberation. Some texts suggest that a bodhisattva's non-retrogression is linked to prior predictions (vyākaraṇa) made by past Buddhas, affirming their inevitable attainment of supreme enlightenment. Moreover, while later traditions integrate skillful means (upāyakauśalya) as a defining trait of the avaivartin, early texts such as Lokakṣema's Aṣṭa emphasize avoiding complacency in meditative absorption, which could lead to an arhat-like state rather than the full Buddhahood sought by bodhisattvas.

==== Bhūmis (stages) ====
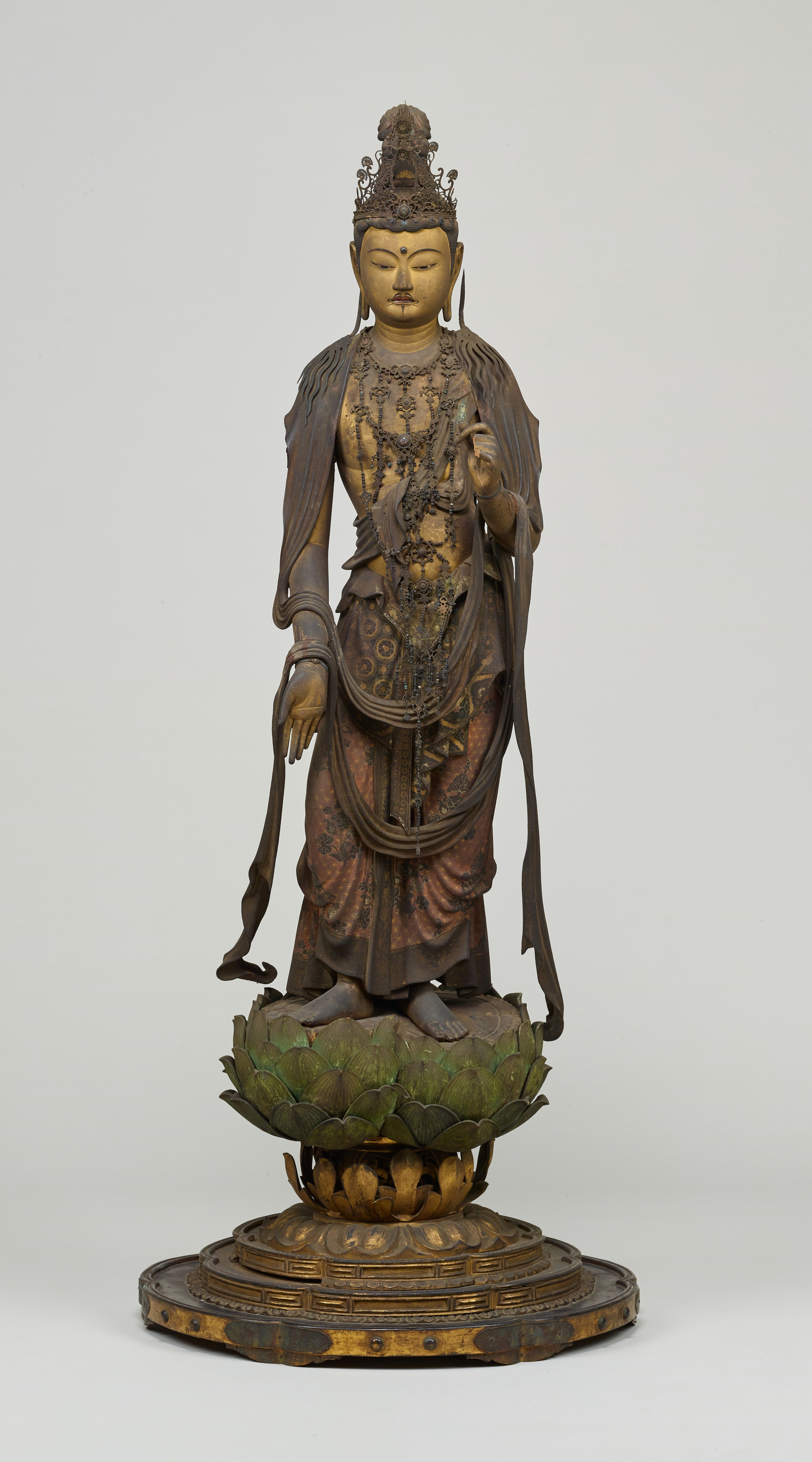
Maitreya, 13th century, Kamakura period, Tokyo National Museum, Important Cultural Property of Japan

According to various Mahāyāna sources, on the way to becoming a Buddha, a bodhisattva proceeds through various stages (bhūmis) of spiritual progress. The term bhūmi means "earth" or "place" and figurately can mean "ground, plane, stage, level; state of consciousness". There are various lists of bhumis, the most common is a list of ten found in the Daśabhūmikasūtra (but there are also lists of seven stages as well as lists which have more than 10 stages).

The Daśabhūmikasūtra lists the following ten stages:

1. Great Joy: It is said that being close to enlightenment and seeing the benefit for all sentient beings, one achieves great joy, hence the name. In this bhūmi the bodhisattvas practice all perfections (pāramitās), but especially emphasizing generosity (dāna).
2. Stainless: In accomplishing the second bhūmi, the bodhisattva is free from the stains of immorality, therefore, this bhūmi is named "stainless". The emphasized perfection is moral discipline (śīla).
3. Luminous: The light of Dharma is said to radiate for others from the bodhisattva who accomplishes the third bhūmi. The emphasized perfection is patience (kṣānti).
4. Radiant: This bhūmi it is said to be like a radiating light that fully burns that which opposes enlightenment. The emphasized perfection is vigor (vīrya).
5. Very difficult to train: Bodhisattvas who attain this ground strive to help sentient beings attain maturity, and do not become emotionally involved when such beings respond negatively, both of which are difficult to do. The emphasized perfection is meditative concentration (dhyāna).
6. Obviously Transcendent: By depending on the perfection of wisdom, [the bodhisattva] does not abide in either saṃsāra or nirvāṇa, so this state is "obviously transcendent". The emphasized perfection is wisdom (prajñā).
7. Gone afar: Particular emphasis is on the perfection of skillful means (upāya), to help others.
8. Immovable: The emphasized virtue is aspiration. This "immovable" bhūmi is where one becomes able to choose his place of rebirth.
9. Good Discriminating Wisdom: The emphasized virtue is the understanding of self and non-self.
10. Cloud of Dharma: The emphasized virtue is the practice of primordial wisdom. After this bhūmi, one attains full Buddhahood.

In some sources, these ten stages are correlated with a different schema of the buddhist path called the five paths which is derived from Vaibhasika Abhidharma sources.

The Śūraṅgama Sūtra recognizes 57 stages. Various Vajrayāna schools recognize additional grounds (varying from 3 to 10 further stages), mostly 6 more grounds with variant descriptions. A bodhisattva above the 7th ground is called a mahāsattva. Some bodhisattvas such as Samantabhadra are also said to have already attained Buddhahood.

=== Sōtō Zen ===
As part of the Sōtō Zen school of Mahāyanā, Dōgen Zenji described Four Exemplary Acts of a Bodhisattva:

- Offering Alms: Not being covetous or greedy;
- Kind Speech: Feeling genuine affection for other sentient beings and offering words that are neither harsh nor rude.
- Benevolence: Working out skillful methods to benefit sentient beings, be they of low or high station.
- Manifesting Sympathy: Not making differences, not treating yourself as different and not treating others as different.

== Mahayana bodhisattvas ==
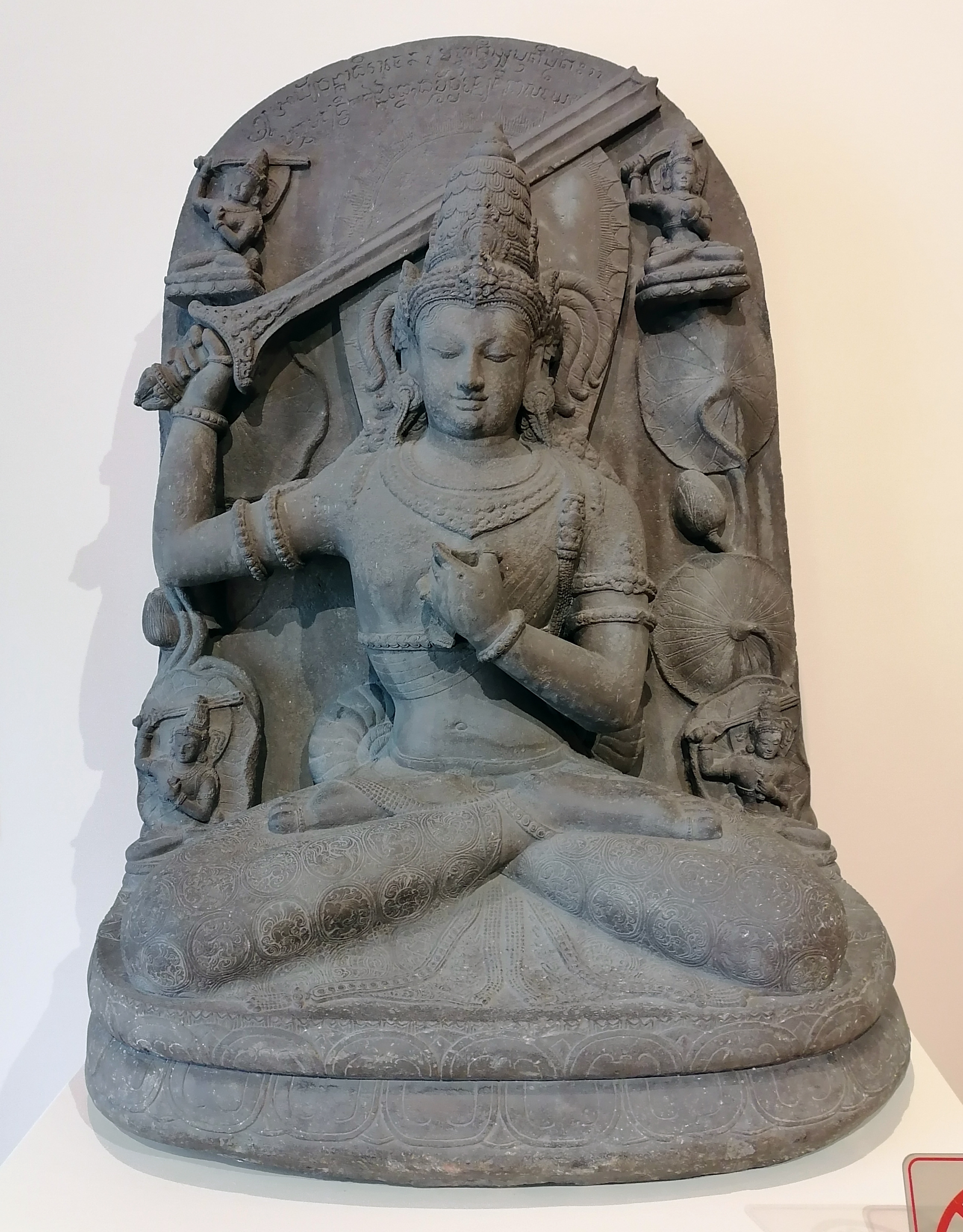
Mañjuśrī figure from Candi Jago, 14th century Java, Indonesia

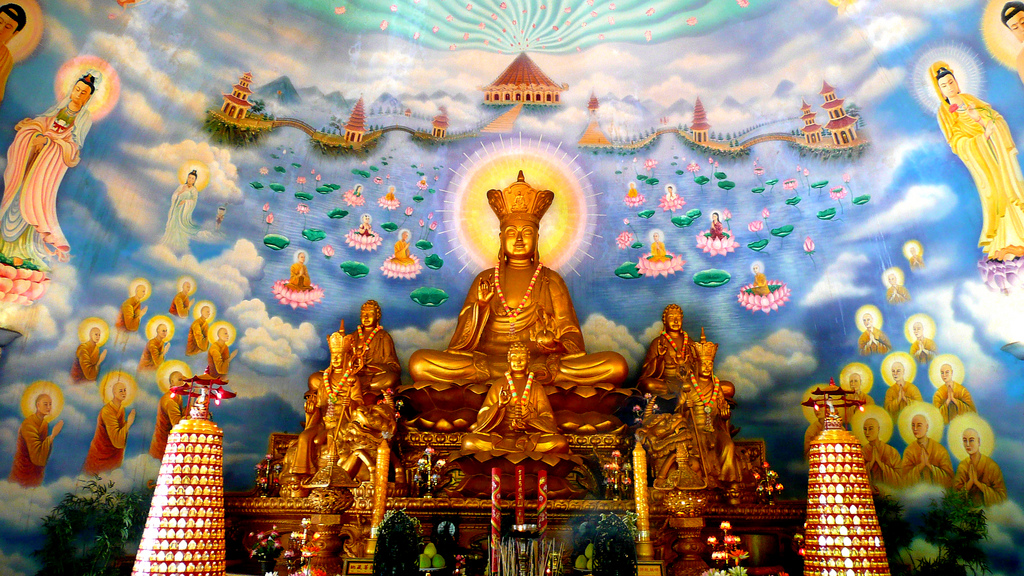
Statue of Ksitigarbha, the background art depicts his pure land and attendant bodhisattvas. From a Buddhist temple in Ho Chi Minh City, Vietnam.

Buddhists (especially Mahayanists) venerate several bodhisattvas (such as Maitreya, Manjushri and Avalokiteshvara) which are seen as highly spiritually advanced (having attained the tenth bhumi) and thus possessing immense magical power. According to Lewis Lancaster, these "celestial" or "heavenly" bodhisattvas are seen as "either the manifestations of a Buddha or they are beings who possess the power of producing many bodies through great feats of magical transformation."

The religious devotion to these bodhisattvas probably first developed in north India, and they are widely depicted in Gandharan and Kashmiri art. In Asian art, they are typically depicted as princes and princesses, with royal robes and jewellery (since they are the princes of the Dharma). In Buddhist art, a bodhisattva is often described as a beautiful figure with a serene expression and graceful manner. This is probably in accordance to the description of Prince Siddhārtha Gautama as a bodhisattva. The depiction of bodhisattva in Buddhist art around the world aspires to express the bodhisattva's qualities such as loving-kindness (metta), compassion (karuna), empathetic joy (mudita), and equanimity (upekkha).

Literature which glorifies such bodhisattvas and recounts their various miracles remains very popular in Asia. One example of such a work of literature is More Records of Kuan-shih-yin's Responsive Manifestations by Lu Kao (459–532) which was very influential in China. In Tibetan Buddhism, the Maṇi Kambum is a similarly influential text (a revealed text, or terma) which focuses on Chenrezig (Avalokiteshvara, who is seen as the country's patron bodhisattva) and his miraculous activities in Tibet.

These celestial bodhisattvas like Avalokiteshvara (Guanyin) are also seen as compassionate savior figures, constantly working for the good of all beings. The Avalokiteshvara chapter of the Lotus Sutra even states that calling Avalokiteshvara to mind can help save someone from natural disasters, demons, and other calamities. It is also supposed to protect one from the afflictions (lust, anger and ignorance). Bodhisattvas can also transform themselves into whatever physical form is useful for helping sentient beings (a god, a bird, a male or female, even a Buddha). Because of this, bodhisattvas are seen as beings that one can pray to for aid and consolation from the sufferings of everyday life as well as for guidance in the path to enlightenment. Thus, the great translator Xuanzang is said to have constantly prayed to Avalokiteshvara for protection on his long journey to India.

=== Eight main Bodhisattvas ===
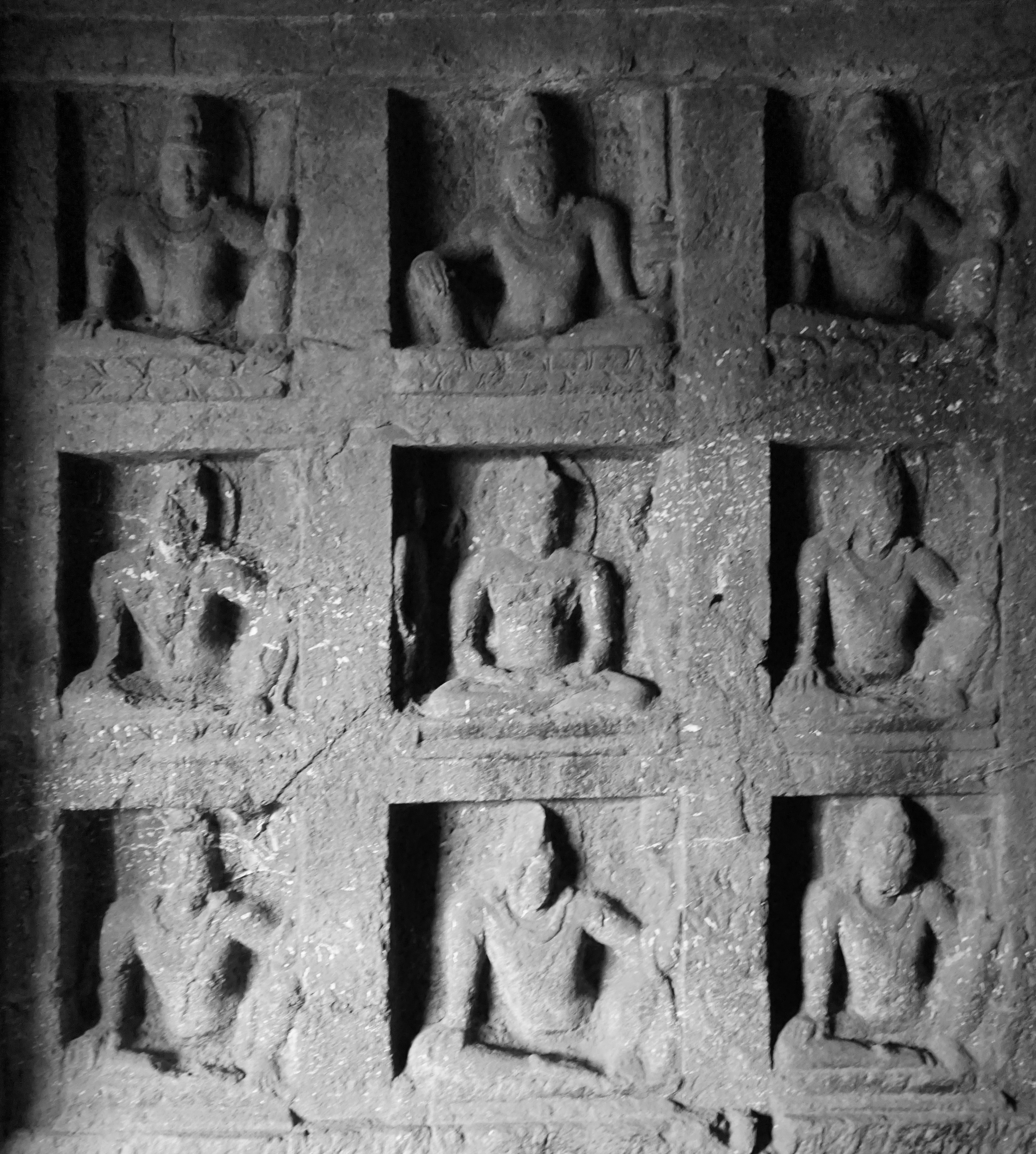
Eight great bodhisattvas at Ellora Caves (cave no. 12).

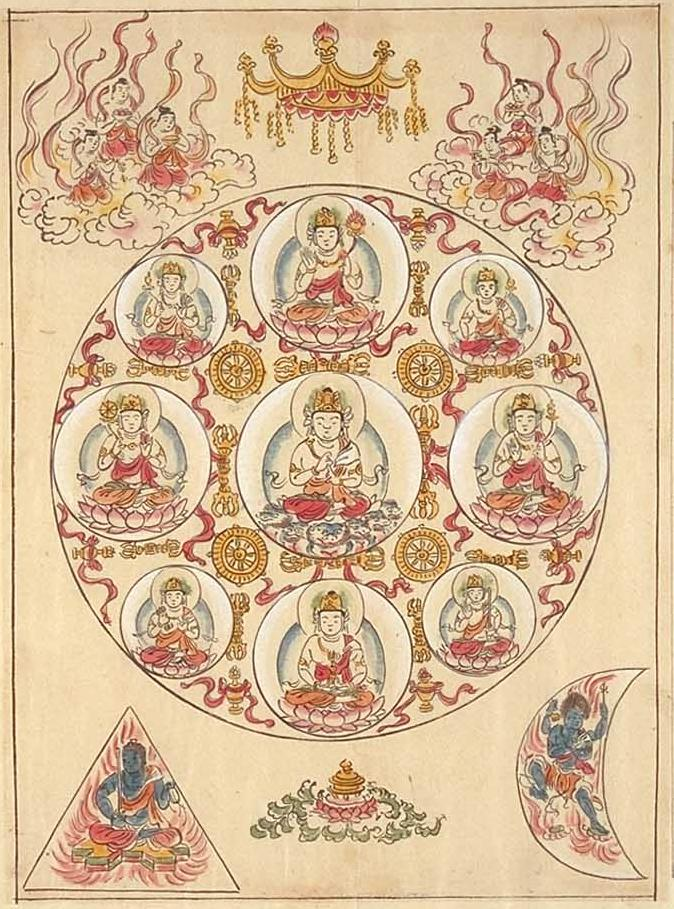
A Japanese illustration of the "sonsho mandala" which depicts Vairocana surrounded by the eight great bodhisattvas

In the later Indian Vajrayana tradition, there arose a popular grouping of eight bodhisattvas known as the "Eight Great Bodhisattvas", or "Eight Close Sons" (Skt. aṣṭa utaputra; Tib. nyewé sé gyé) and are seen as the most important Mahayana bodhisattvas and appear in numerous esoteric mandalas (e.g. Garbhadhatu mandala).

These same "Eight Great Bodhisattvas" (Chn. Bādà Púsà, Jp. Hachi Daibosatsu) also appear in East Asian Esoteric Buddhist sources, such as The Sutra on the Maṇḍalas of the Eight Great Bodhisattvas (八大菩薩曼荼羅經), translated by Amoghavajra in the 8th century and Faxian (10th century).

While there are numerous lists of Eight Great Bodhisattvas, the most widespread or "standard" listing is:

- Mañjuśrī ("Gentle Glory") Kumarabhuta ("Young Prince"), the main bodhisattva of wisdom
- Avalokiteśvara ("Lord who gazes down at the world"), the savior bodhisattva of great compassion
- Vajrapāṇi ("Vajra in hand"), the bodhisattva of protection, the protector of the Buddha (in East Asian sources, this figure appears as Mahāsthāmaprāpta)
- Maitreya ("Friendly One"), will become the Buddha of our world in the future
- Kṣitigarbha ("Earth Source")
- Ākāśagarbha ("Space Source") also known as Gaganagañja
- Sarvanivāraṇaviṣkambhin ("He who blocks the hindrances")
- Samantabhadra ("Universal Worthy", or "All Good")

=== Female bodhisattvas ===
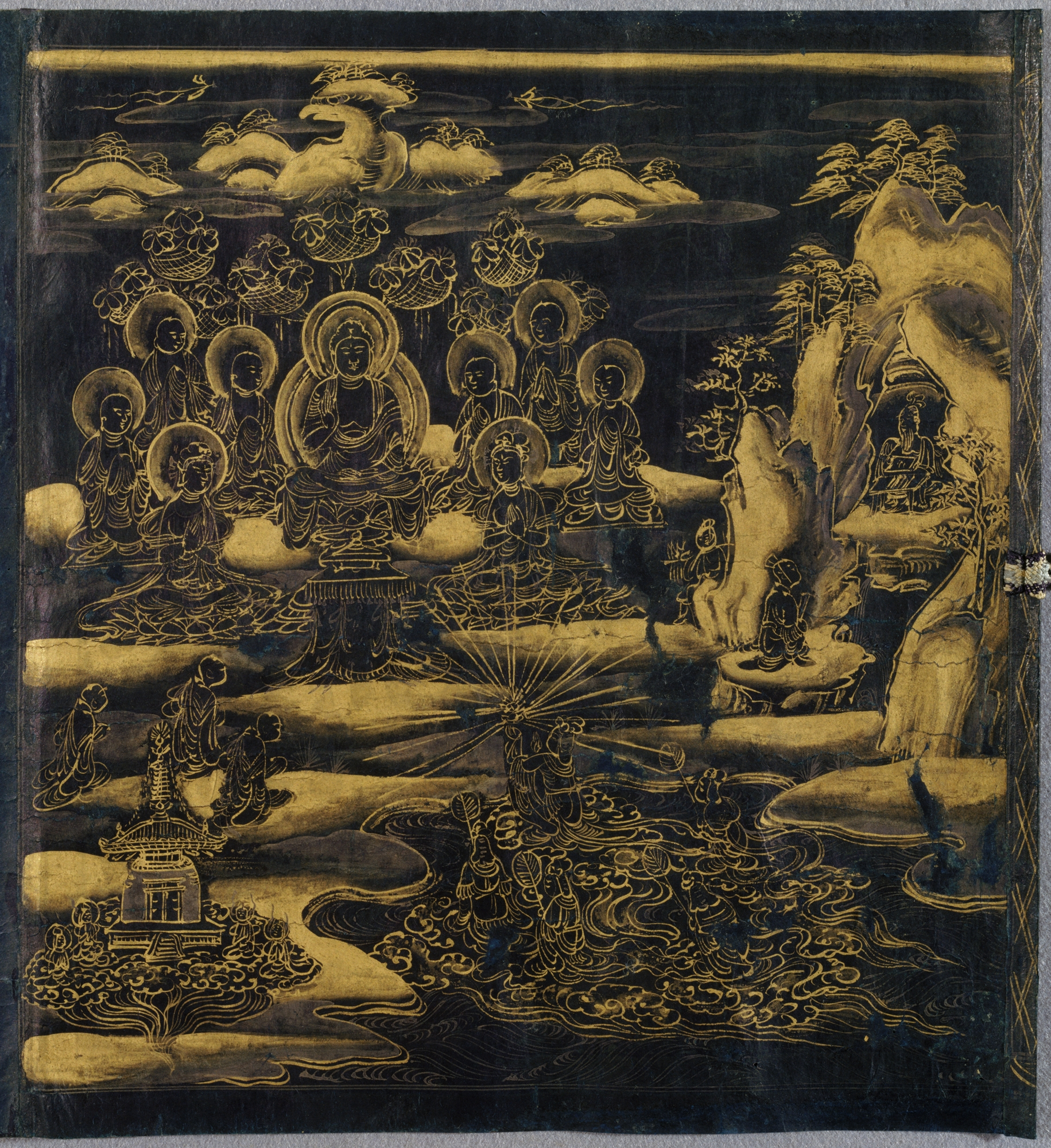
A 12th-century Japanese illustration of the nāga princess offering the jewel to the Buddha, from the Lotus Sutra

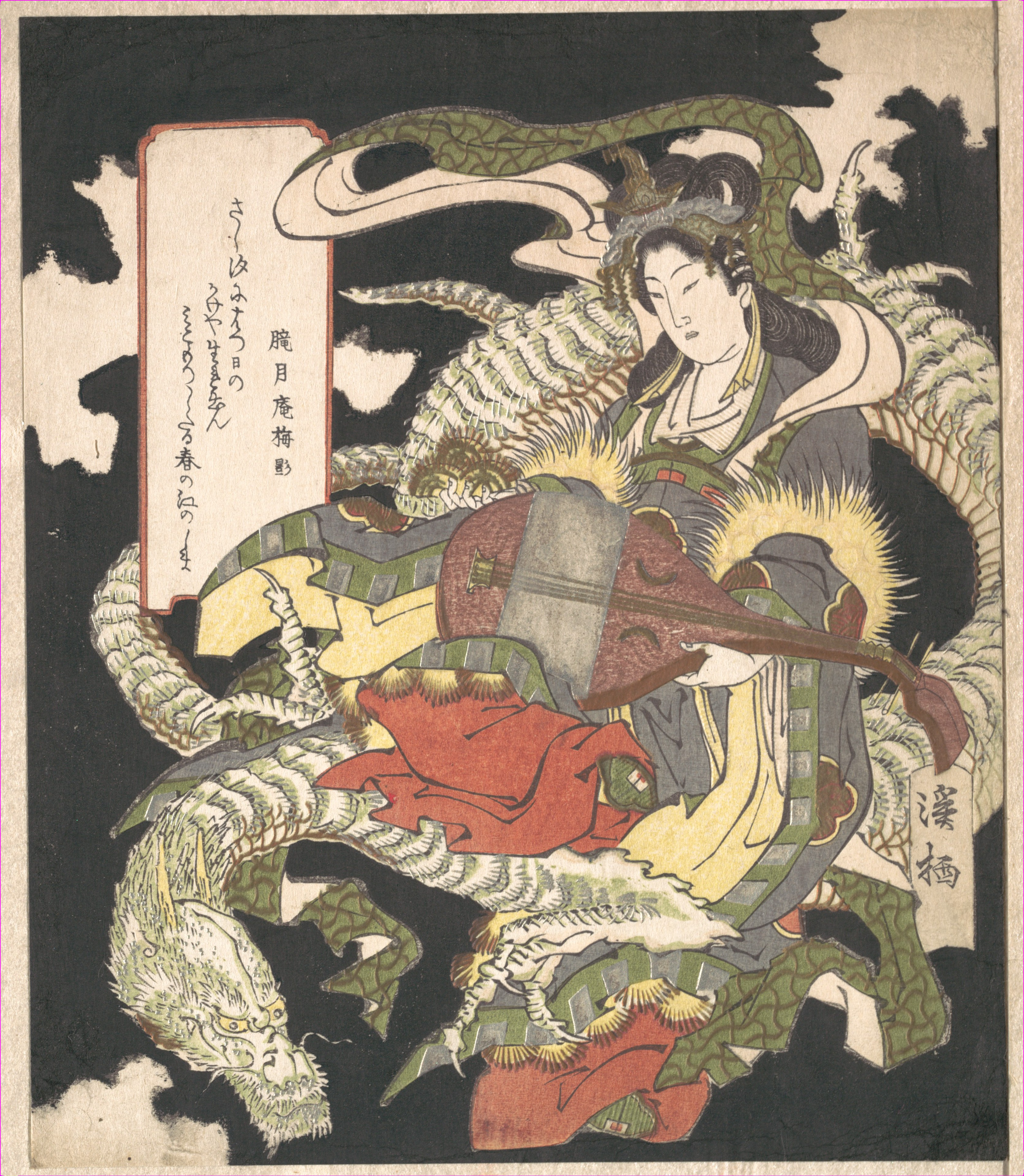
Japanese illustration of Benzaiten, seated on a white dragon. Some Japanese sources associate this figure with the naga princess in the Lotus sutra

The bodhisattva Prajñāpāramitā-devi is a female personification of the perfection of wisdom and the Prajñāpāramitā sutras. She became an important figure, widely depicted in Indian Buddhist art.

Guanyin (Jp: Kannon), a female form of Avalokiteshvara, is the most widely revered bodhisattva in East Asian Buddhism, generally depicted as a motherly figure. Guanyin is venerated in various other forms and manifestations, including Cundī, Cintāmaṇicakra, Hayagriva, Eleven-Headed Thousand-Armed Guanyin and Guanyin Of The Southern Seas among others.

Gender variant representations of some bodhisattvas, most notably Avalokiteśvara, has prompted conversation regarding the nature of a bodhisattva's appearance. Chan master Sheng Yen has stated that Mahāsattvas such as Avalokiteśvara (known as Guanyin in Chinese) are androgynous (Ch. 中性; pinyin: "zhōngxìng"), which accounts for their ability to manifest in masculine and feminine forms of various degrees.

In Tibetan Buddhism, Tara or Jetsun Dölma (rje btsun sgrol ma) is the most important female bodhisattva.

Numerous Mahayana sutras feature female bodhisattvas as main characters and discuss their life, teachings and future Buddhahood. These include The Questions of the Girl Vimalaśraddhā (Tohoku Kangyur - Toh number 84), The Questions of Vimaladattā (Toh 77), The Lion's Roar of Śrīmālādevī (Toh 92), The Inquiry of Lokadhara (Toh 174), The Sūtra of Aśokadattā's Prophecy (Toh 76), The Questions of Vimalaprabhā (Toh 168), The Sūtra of Kṣemavatī's Prophecy (Toh 192), The Questions of the Girl Sumati (Toh 74), The Questions of Gaṅgottara (Toh 75), The Questions of an Old Lady (Toh 171), The Miraculous Play of Mañjuśrī (Toh 96), and The Sūtra of the Girl Candrottarā's Prophecy (Toh 191).

=== Popular figures ===
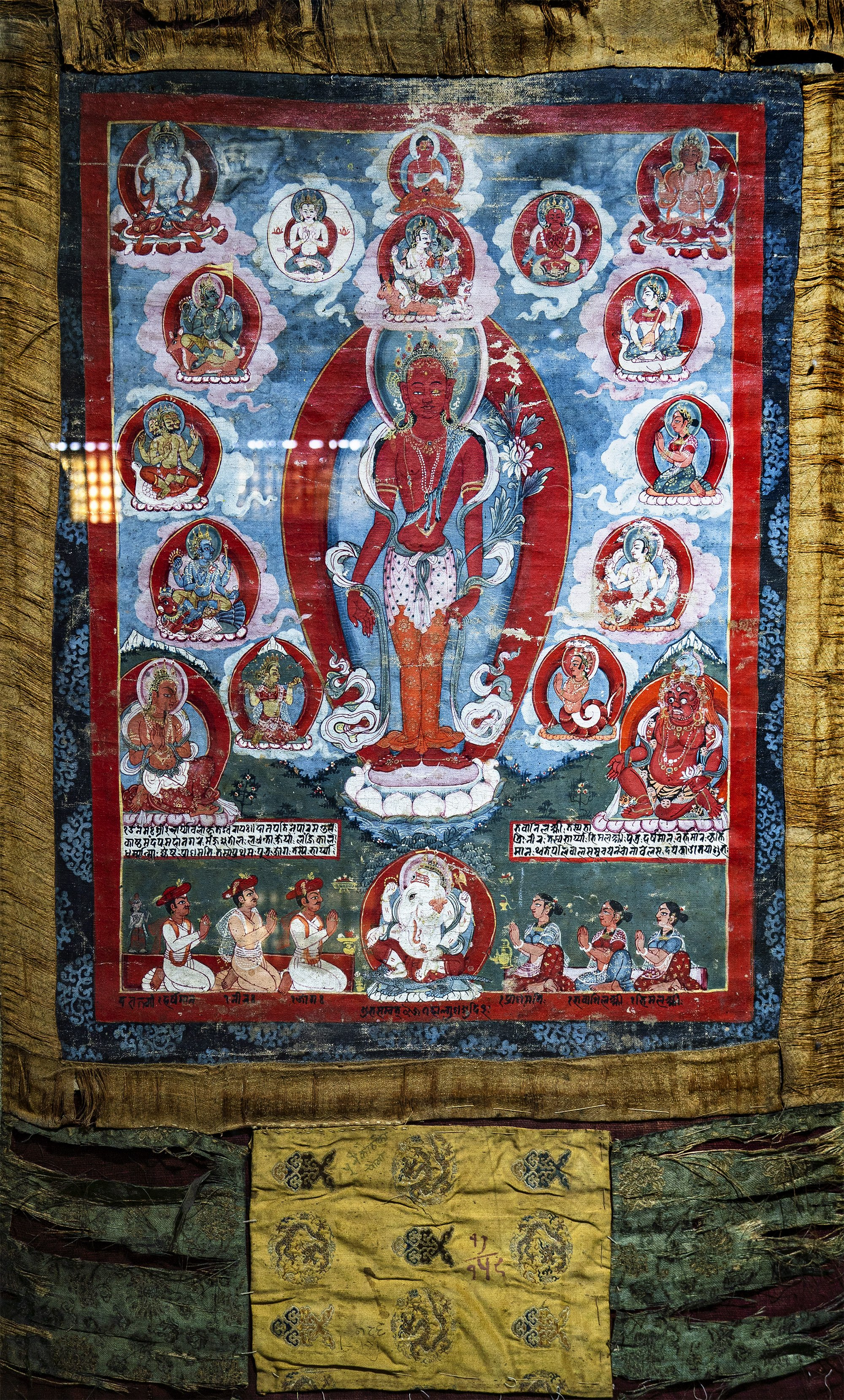
Sṛṣṭikartā Lokeśvara (Avalokiteshvara in the process of creation), in which the bodhisattva takes on the form of Sṛṣṭikartā (creator) and emanates all the Hindu gods for the benefit of sentient beings.

Over time, numerous historical Buddhist figures also came to be seen as bodhisattvas in their own right, deserving of devotion. For example, an extensive hagiography developed around Nagarjuna, the Indian founder of the madhyamaka school of philosophy. Followers of Tibetan Buddhism consider the Dalai Lamas and the Karmapas to be an emanation of Chenrezig, the Bodhisattva of Compassion. Various Japanese Buddhist schools consider their founding figures like Kukai and Nichiren to be bodhisattvas. In Chinese Buddhism, various historical figures have been called bodhisattvas.

Furthermore, various Hindu deities are considered to be bodhisattvas in Mahayana Buddhist sources. For example, in the Kāraṇḍavyūhasūtra, Vishnu, Shiva, Brahma and Saraswati are said to be bodhisattvas, all emanations of Avalokiteshvara. Deities like Saraswati (Chinese: Biàncáitiān, 辯才天, Japanese: Benzaiten) and Shiva (C: Dàzìzàitiān, 大自在天; J: Daikokuten) are still venerated as bodhisattva devas and dharmapalas (guardian deities) in East Asian Buddhism. Both figures are closely connected with Avalokiteshvara. In a similar manner, the Hindu deity Harihara is called a bodhisattva in the famed Nīlakaṇṭha Dhāraṇī, which states: "O Effulgence, World-Transcendent, come, oh Hari, the great bodhisattva."

The empress Wu Zetian of the Tang dynasty, was the only female ruler of China. She used the growing popularity of Esoteric Buddhism in China for her own needs. Though she was not the only ruler to have made such a claim, the political utility of her claims, coupled with sincerity make her a great example. She built several temples and contributed to the finishing of the Longmen Caves and even went on to patronise Buddhism over Confucianism or Daoism. She ruled by the title of "Holy Emperor", and claimed to be a Bodhisattva too. She became one of China's most influential rulers.

=== Others ===
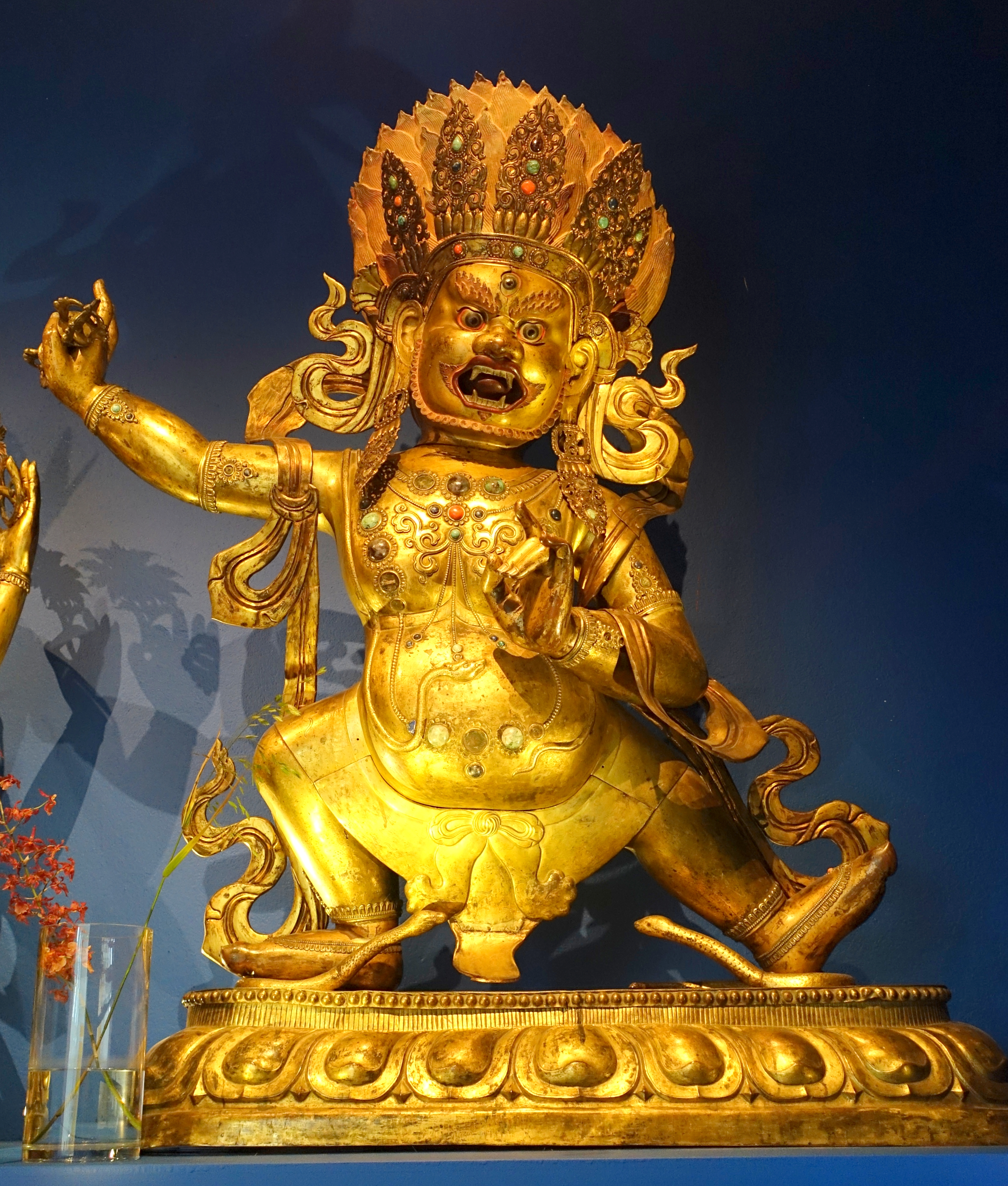
Fierce bodhisattva Vajrapani from Inner Mongolia, Östasiatiska museet, Stockholm, Sweden

Other important bodhisattvas in Mahayana Buddhism include:

- Bhadrapāla, appearing in various sutras like the Lotus
- Vajrasattva, an important figure in Vajrayana Buddhism
- Vimalakirti the famous lay bodhisattva of the Vimalakīrti Nirdeśa
- Akṣayamati, the main character in the influential Akṣayamatinirdeśa Sūtra
- Sadāprarudita, a major bodhisattva in the Prajñāpāramitā sutras
- Sudhana, the main character of the Gaṇḍavyūha Sutra
- The Four Bodhisattvas of the Earth from the Lotus Sutra
- Bhaiṣajyarāja or "Medicine King"
- Candraprabha ("Moon Light")
- Sūryaprabha ("Solar Light")
- Jambhala, a bodhisattva of wealth
- Mahāsthāmaprāpta, the second attendant bodhisattva to Amitabha (after Avalokiteshvara)
- Akṣayamati

=== Fierce bodhisattvas ===
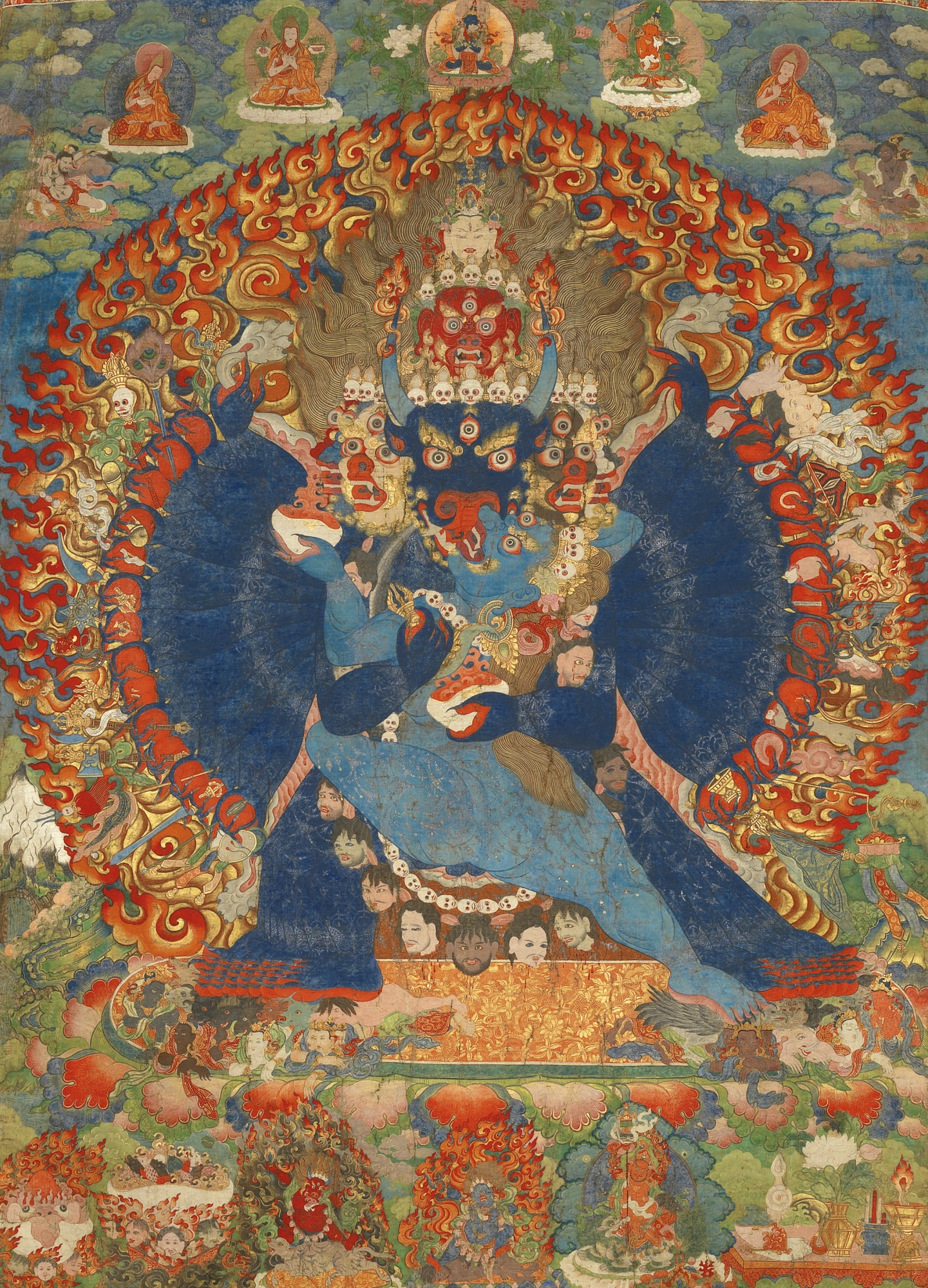
Thangka Depicting Yamantaka, a wrathful manifestation of Manjushri in Tibetan Buddhism

While bodhisattvas tend to be depicted as conventionally beautiful, there are instances of their manifestation as fierceful and monstrous looking beings. A notable example is Guanyin's manifestation as a preta named "Flaming Face" (面燃大士). This trope is commonly employed among the Wisdom Kings, among whom Mahāmāyūrī Vidyārājñī stands out with a feminine title and benevolent expression. In some depictions, her mount takes on a wrathful appearance. This variation is also found among images of Vajrapani.

In Tibetan Buddhism, fierce manifestations (Tibetan: trowo) of the major bodhisattvas are quite common and they often act as protector deities.

=== Sacred places ===
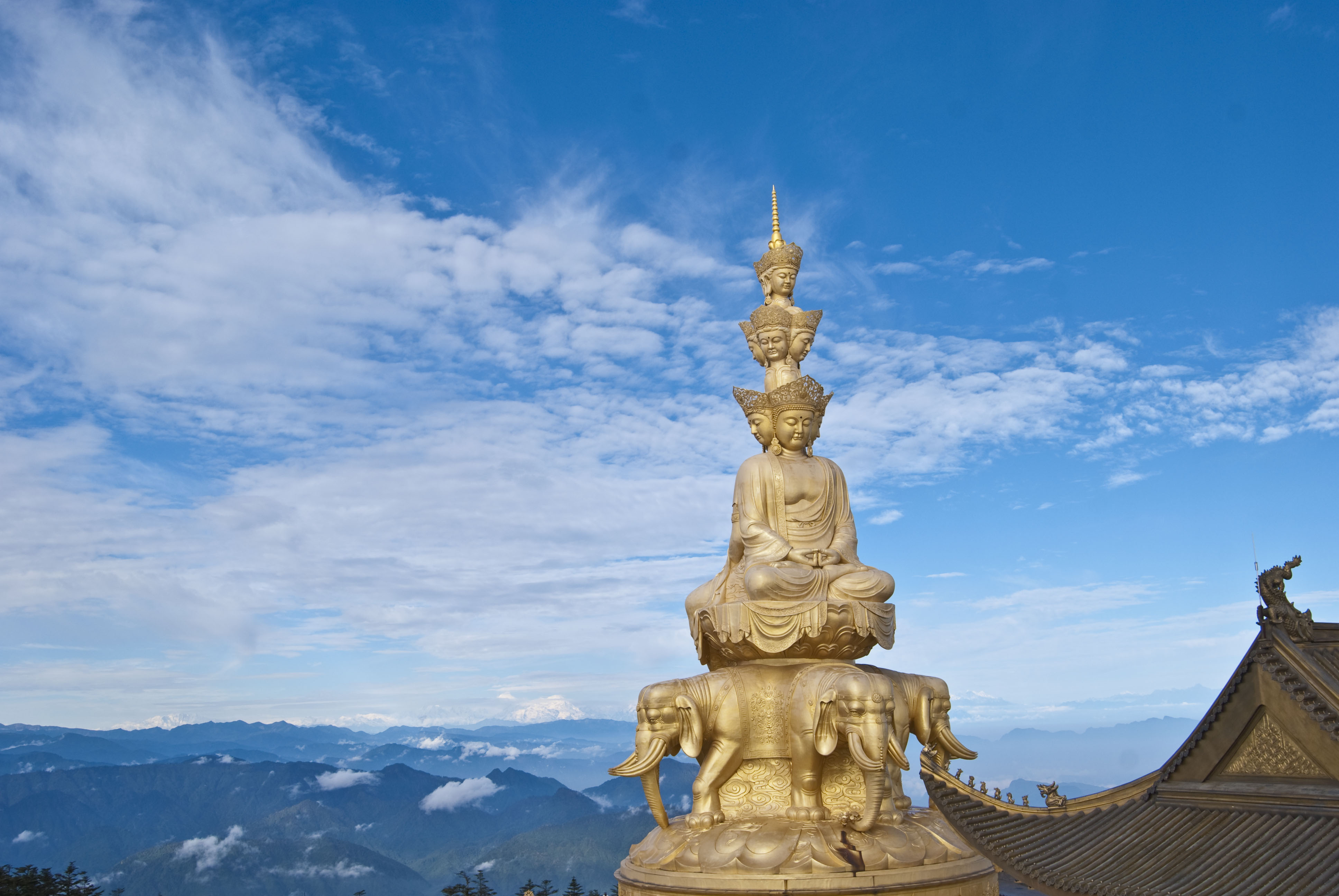
Statue of Samantabhadra bodhisattva at Mount Emei

The place of a bodhisattva's earthly deeds, such as the achievement of enlightenment or the acts of Dharma, is known as a bodhimaṇḍa (place of awakening), and may be a site of pilgrimage. Many temples and monasteries are famous as bodhimaṇḍas. Perhaps the most famous bodhimaṇḍa of all is the Bodhi Tree under which Śākyamuṇi achieved Buddhahood. There are also sacred places of awakening for bodhisattvas located throughout the Buddhist world. Mount Potalaka, a sacred mountain in India, is traditionally held to be Avalokiteshvara's bodhimaṇḍa.

In Chinese Buddhism, there are four mountains that are regarded as bodhimaṇḍas for bodhisattvas, with each site having major monasteries and being popular for pilgrimages by both monastics and laypeople. These four sacred places are:

- Mount Putuo for Guanyin (Avalokiteśvara), the bodhisattva of Compassion (Chinese: 觀自在菩薩, 觀世音菩薩, 觀音菩薩; pinyin: Guānzìzài Púsà, Guānshìyīn Púsà, Guānyīn Púsà)
- Mount Emei for Samantabhadra, the bodhisattva of practice (Chinese: 普賢菩薩 普贤菩萨; pinyin: Pǔxián Púsà)
- Mount Wutai for Mañjuśrī, the bodhisattva of wisdom (Chinese: 文殊菩薩, 文殊师利菩薩, 曼殊室利菩薩, 妙吉祥菩薩; pinyin: Wénshū Púsà, Wénshūshīlì Púsà, Mànshūshìlì Púsà, Miàojíxiáng Púsà)
- Mount Jiuhua for Kṣitigarbha, the bodhisattva of the great vow (Chinese: 地藏菩薩 地藏菩萨; pinyin: Dìzàng Púsà)

== In Theravada Buddhism ==
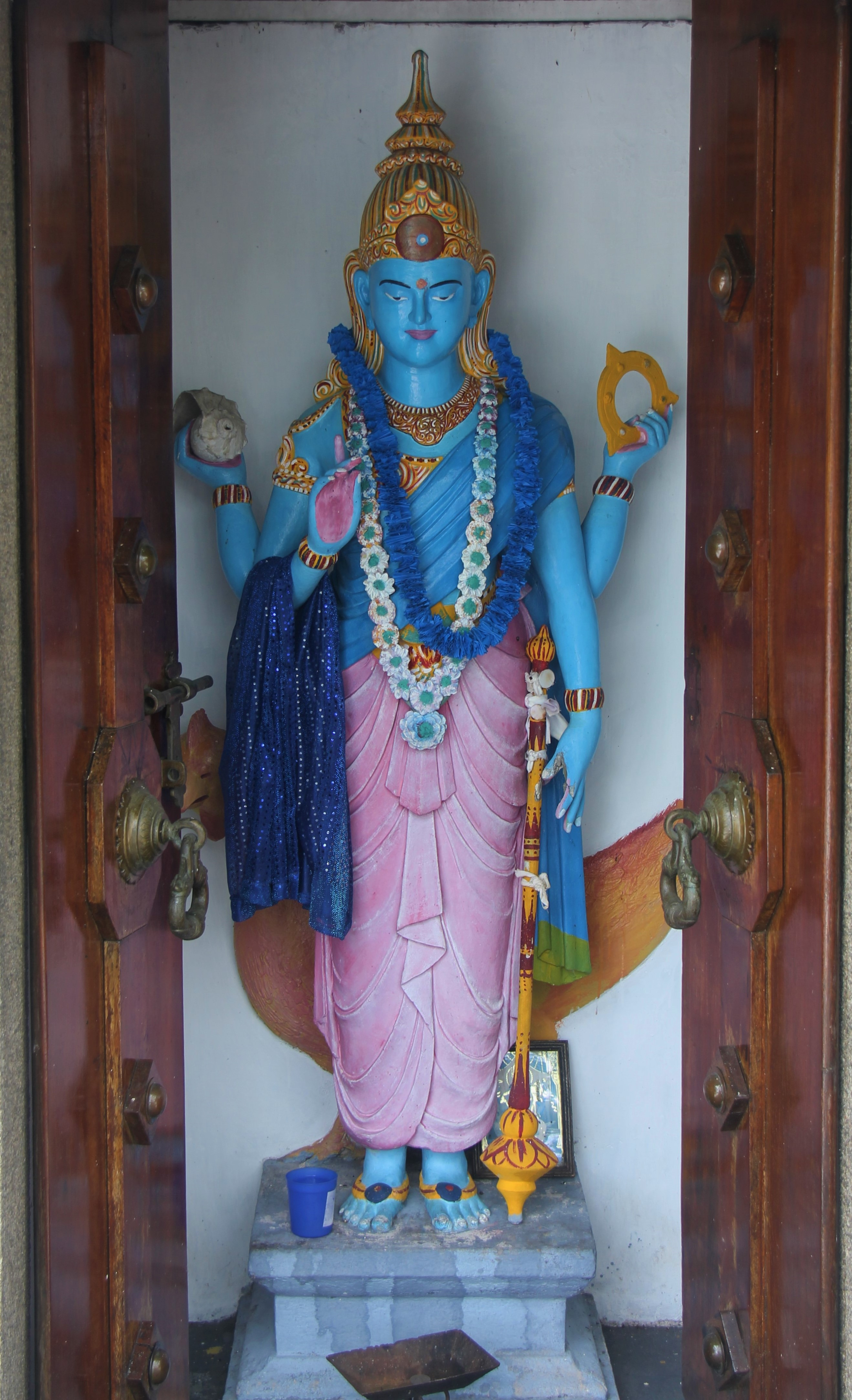
Statue of Upulvan-Vishnu, Seema Malaka, Sri Lanka

While the veneration of bodhisattvas is much more widespread and popular in the Mahayana Buddhist world, it is also found in Theravada Buddhist regions. Bodhisattvas which are venerated in Theravada lands include Natha Deviyo (Avalokiteshvara), Metteya (Maitreya), Upulvan (i.e. Vishnu), Saman (Samantabhadra) and Pattini. The veneration of some of these figures may have been influenced by Mahayana Buddhism. These figures are also understood as devas that have converted to Buddhism and have sworn to protect it.

The recounting of Jataka tales, which discuss the bodhisattva deeds of Gautama before his awakening (i.e. during his past lives as a bodhisatta), also remains a popular practice.

== Gallery ==
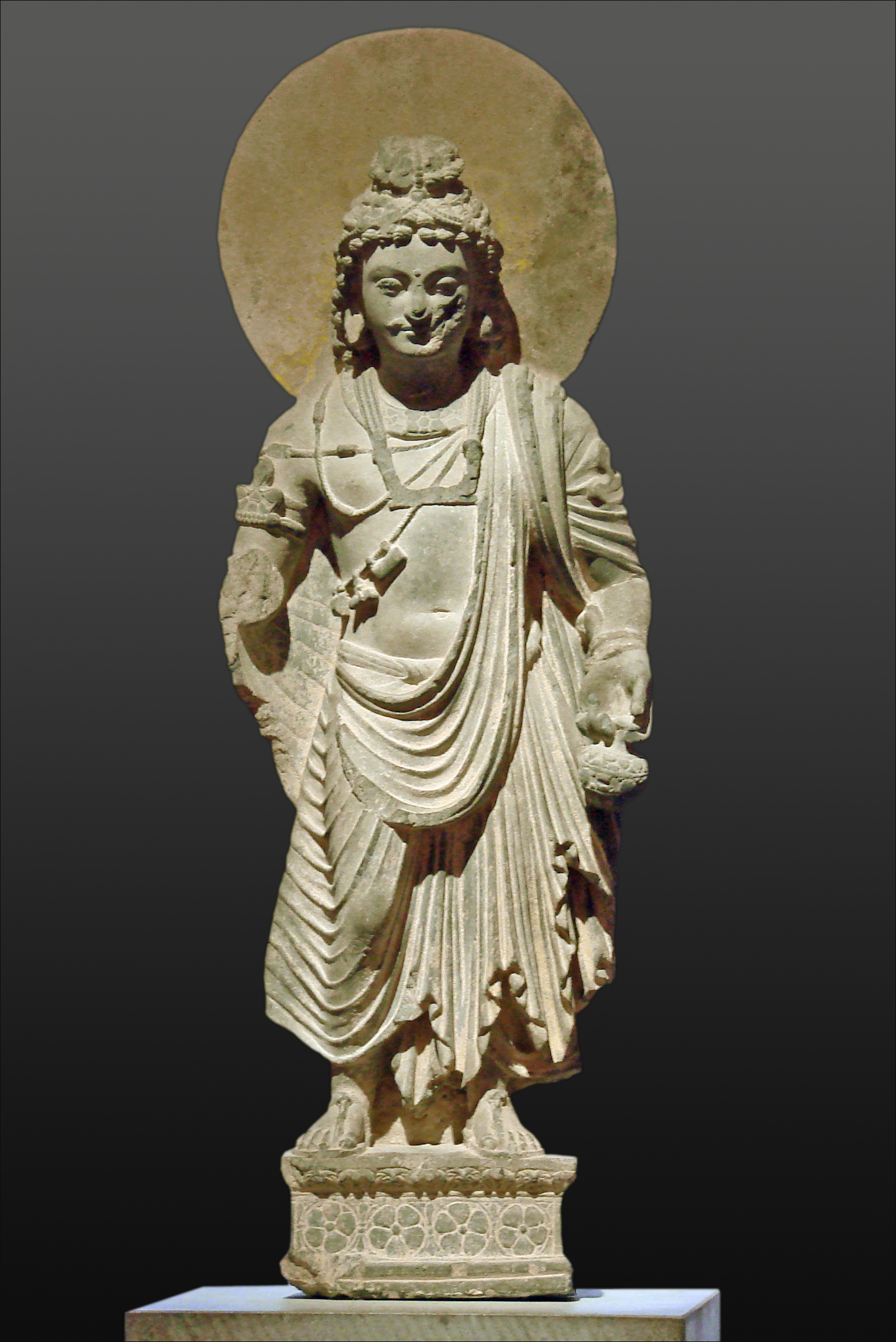
Standing bodhisattva. Gandhāra, 2nd–3rd century

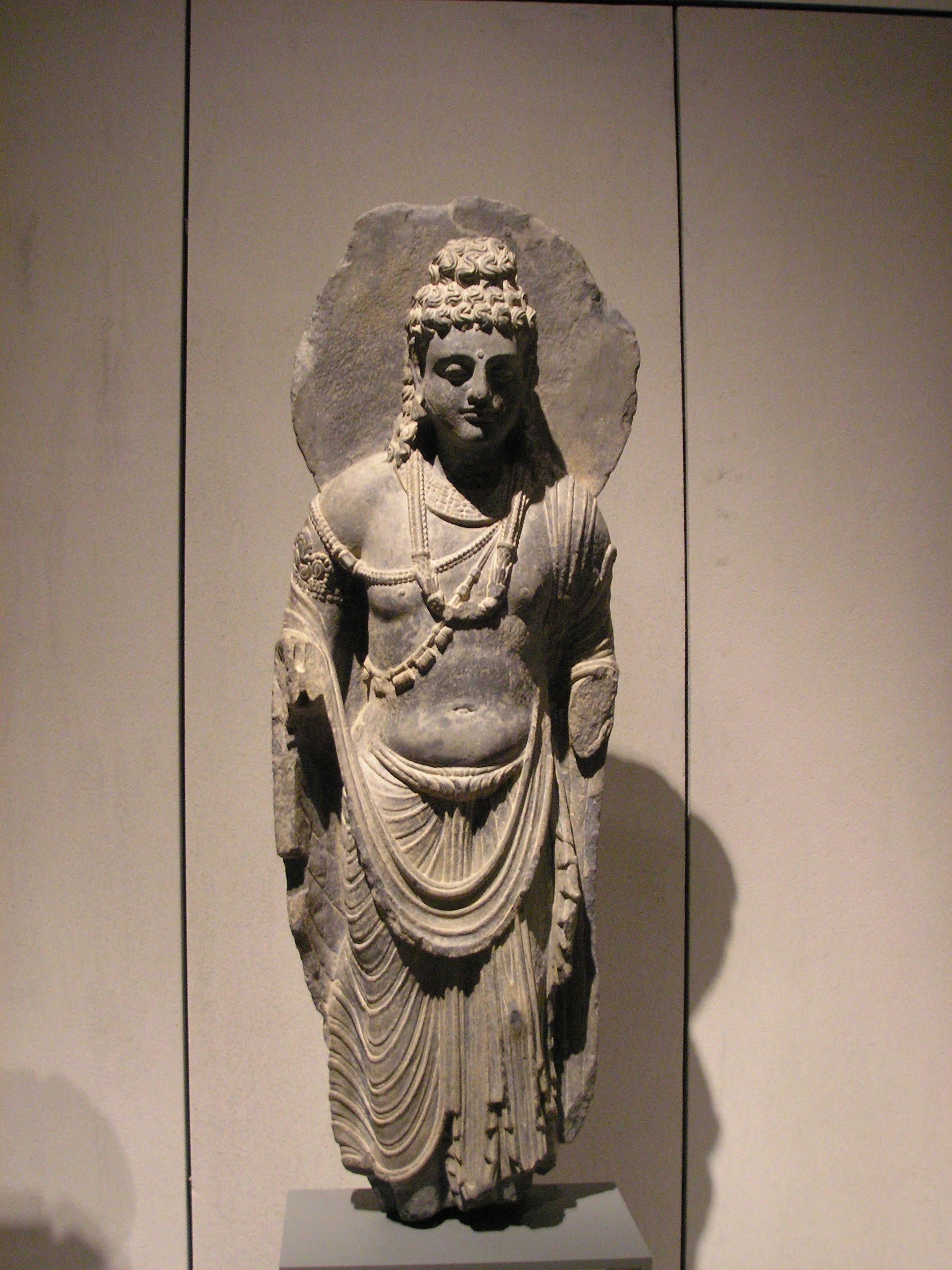
Standing bodhisattva. Gandhāra, 2nd–3rd century

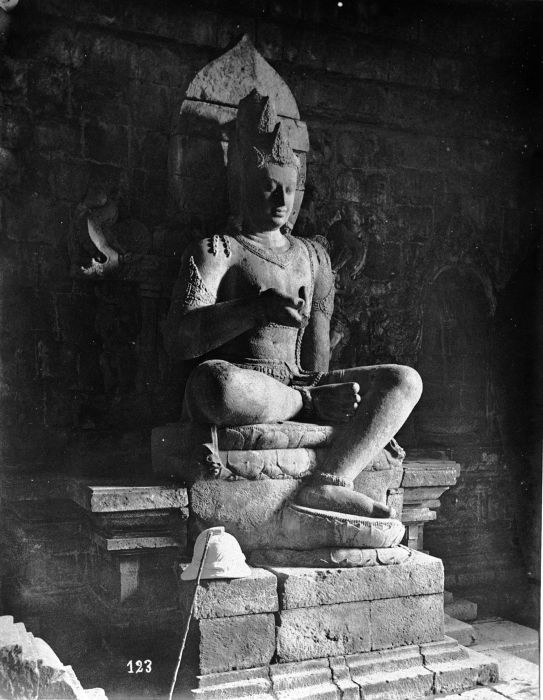
Bodhisattva Vajrapani. Mendut near Borobudur, Central Java, Indonesia. Sailendran art c. 8th century

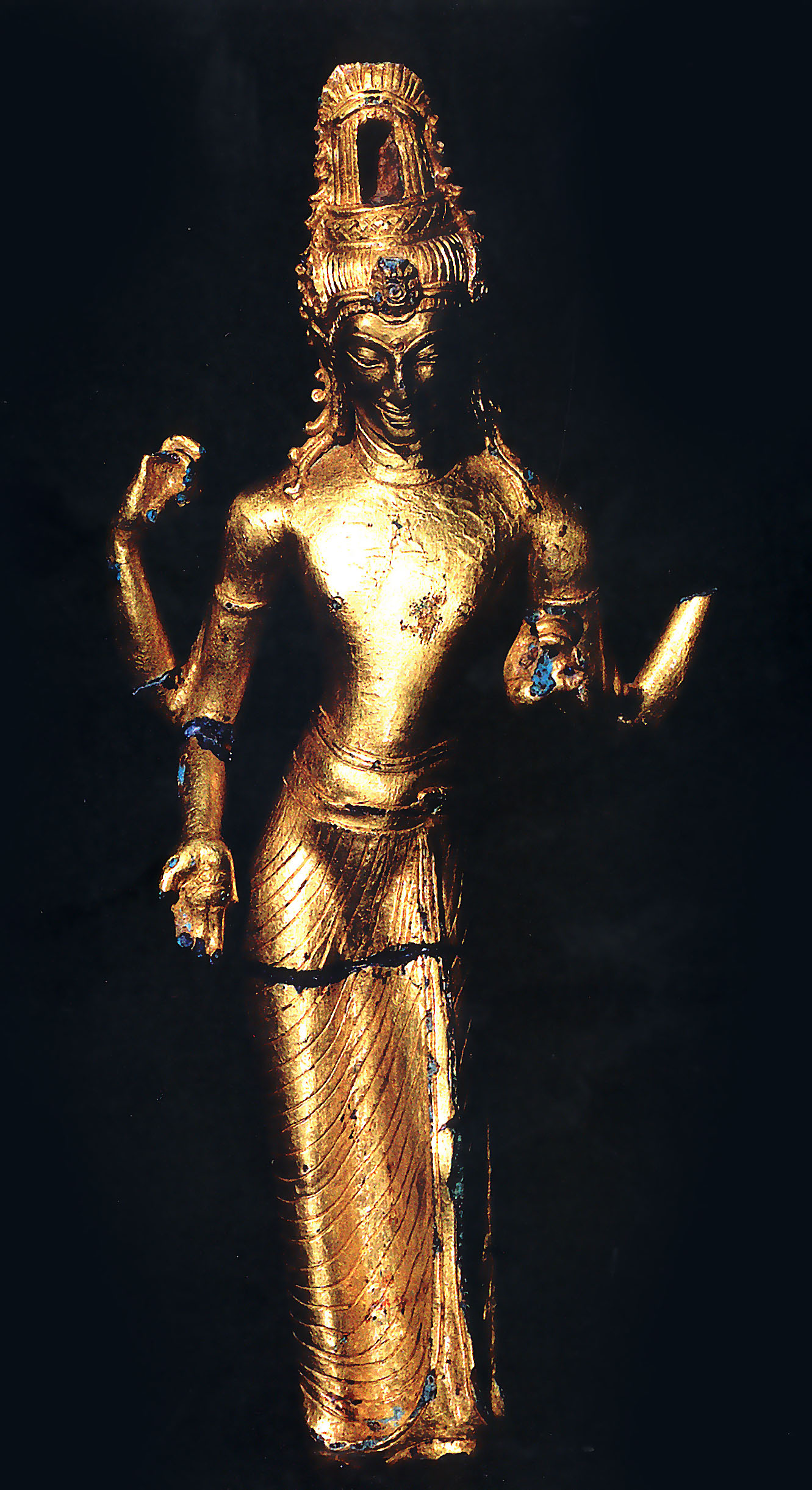
The golden Srivijayan Bodhisattva Avalokiteśvara, Muarabulian, Jambi, Indonesia c. 11th century

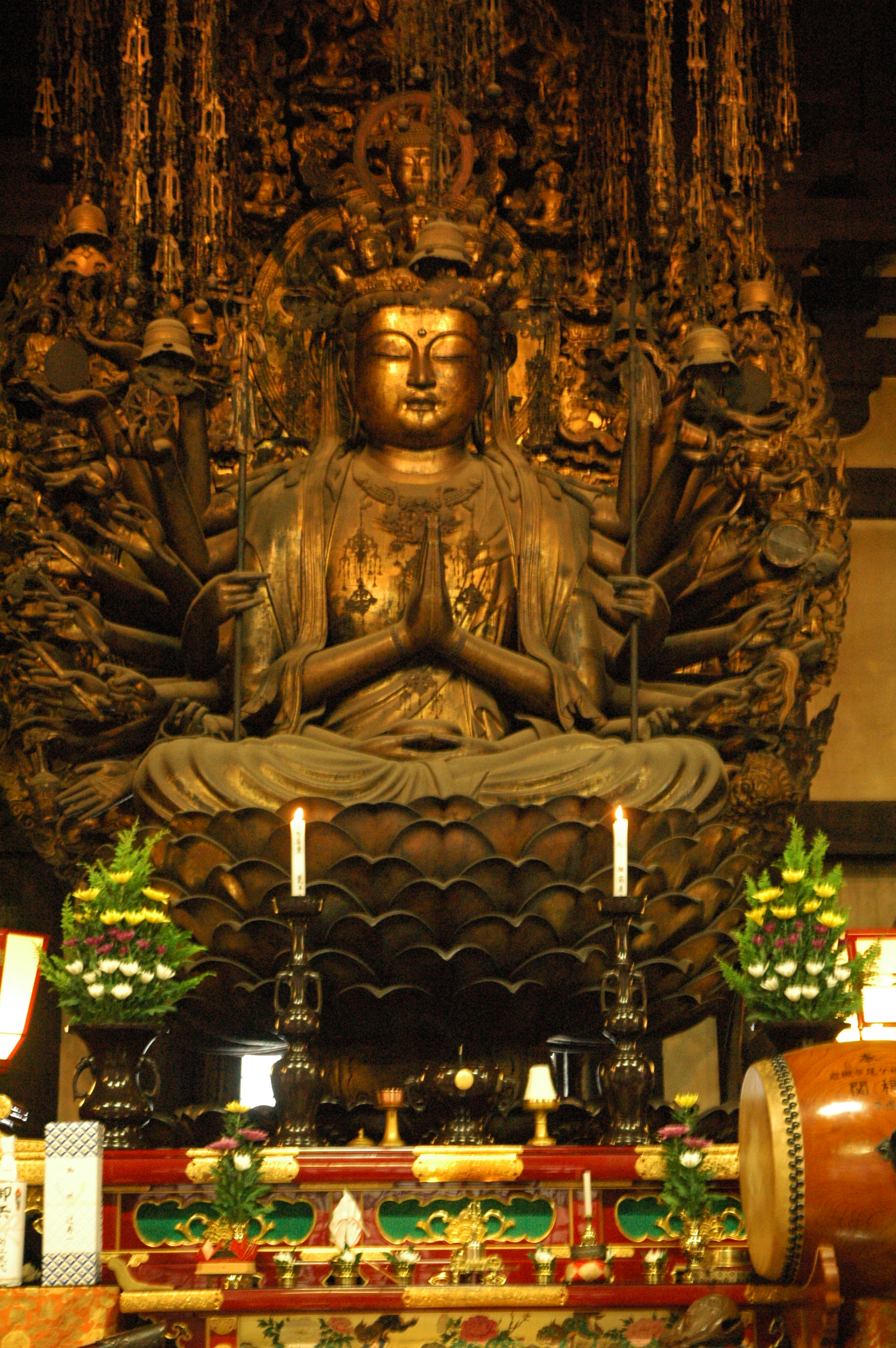
Thousand-armed Bodhisattva, Sanjūsangen-dō, Japan. 13th century

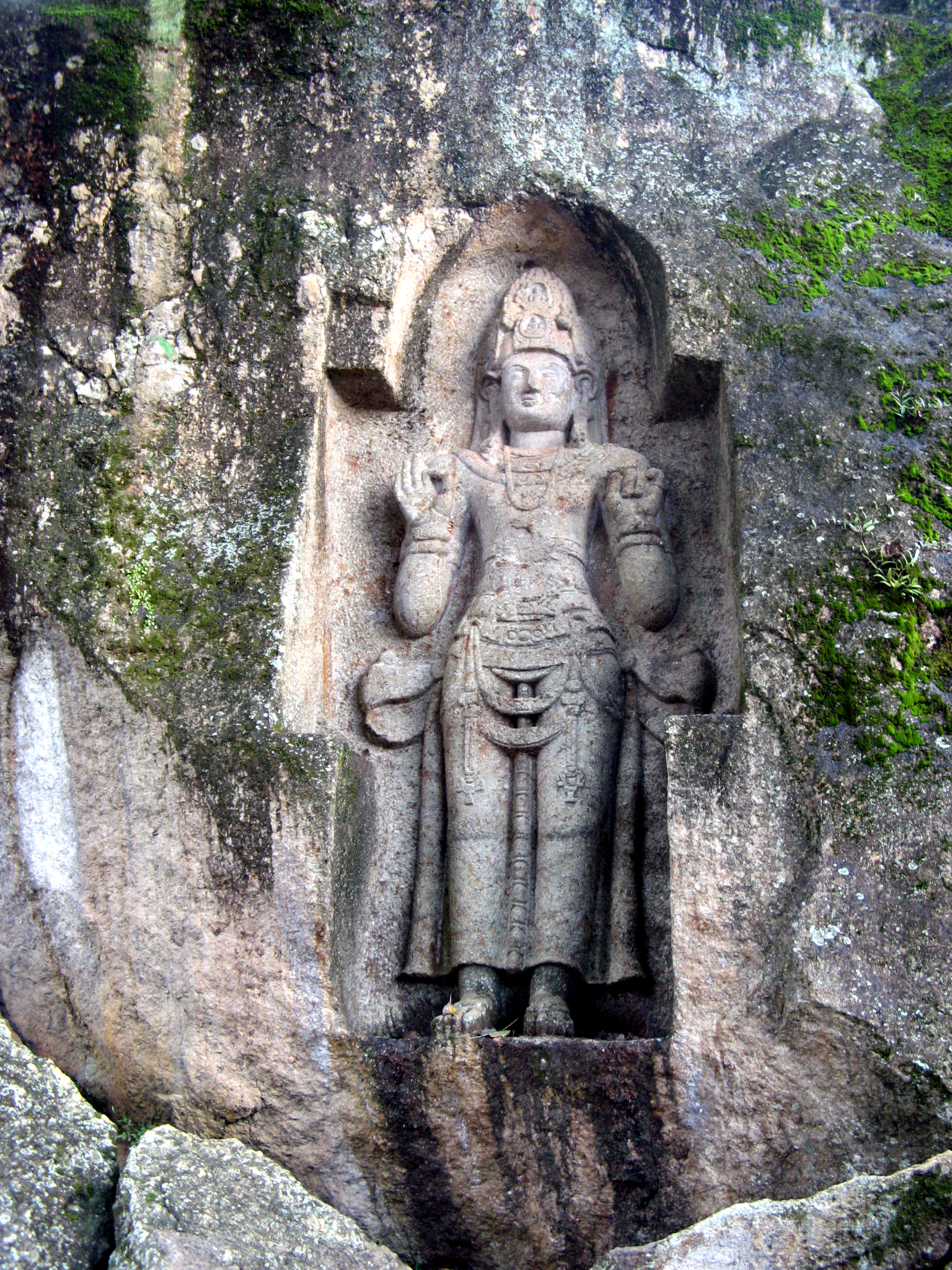
A rock carving of Avalokiteshvara, Weligama, Sri Lanka

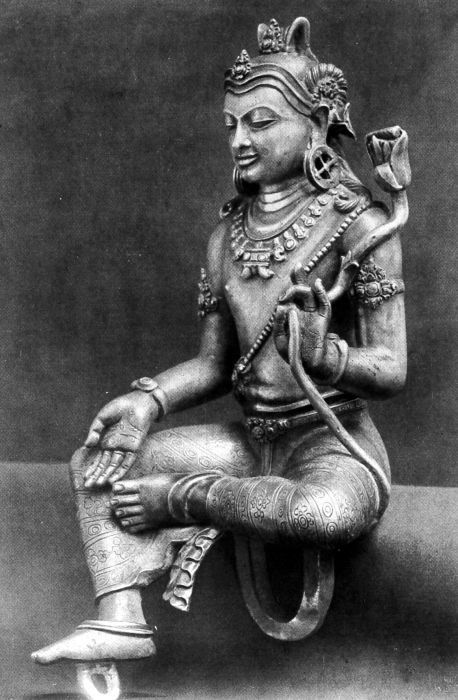
Silver Manjushri, Sailendra, early 9th century Central Java, National Museum

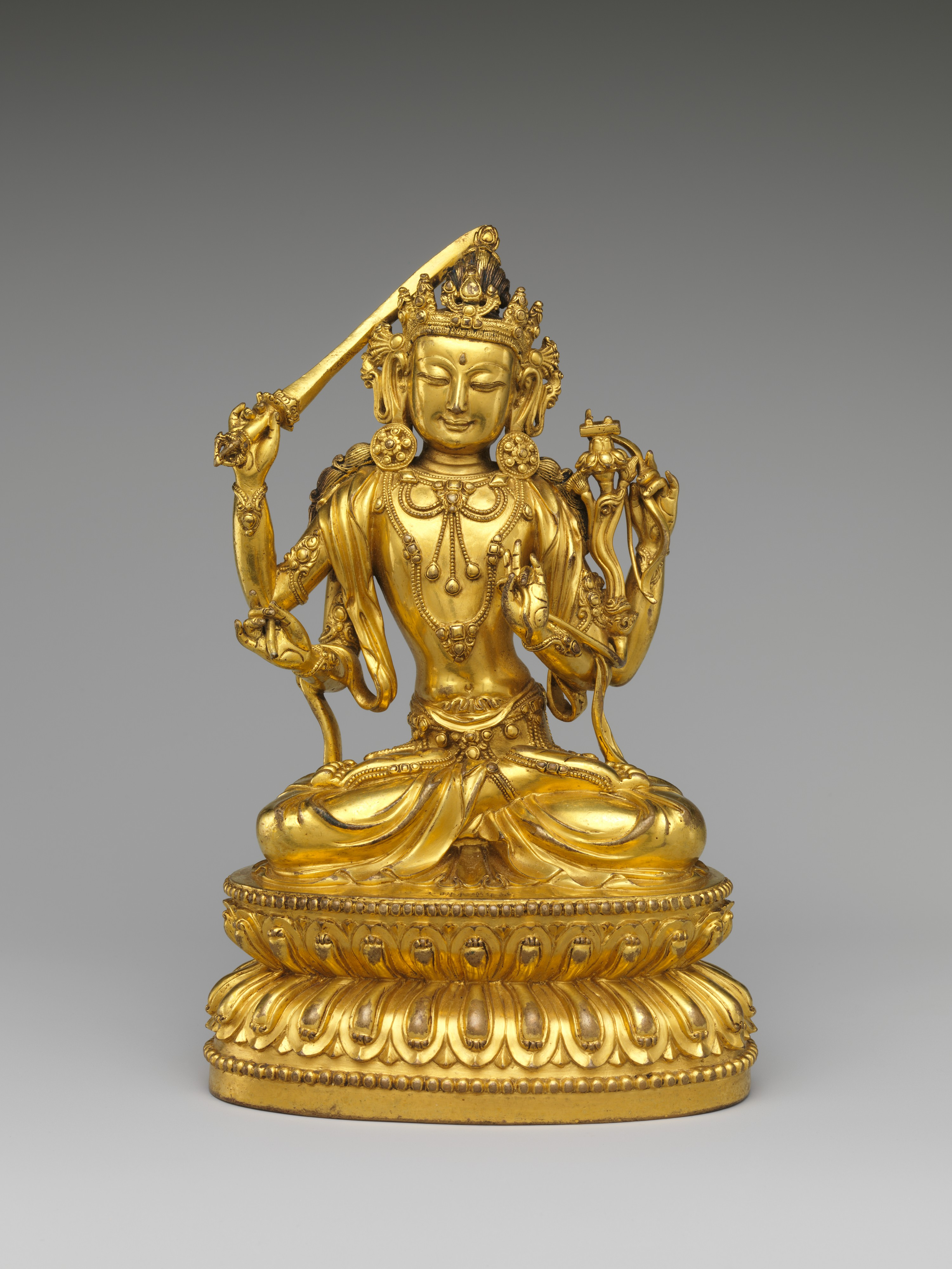
Bodhisattva Manjushri as Tikshna-Manjushri (Minjie Wenshu), China

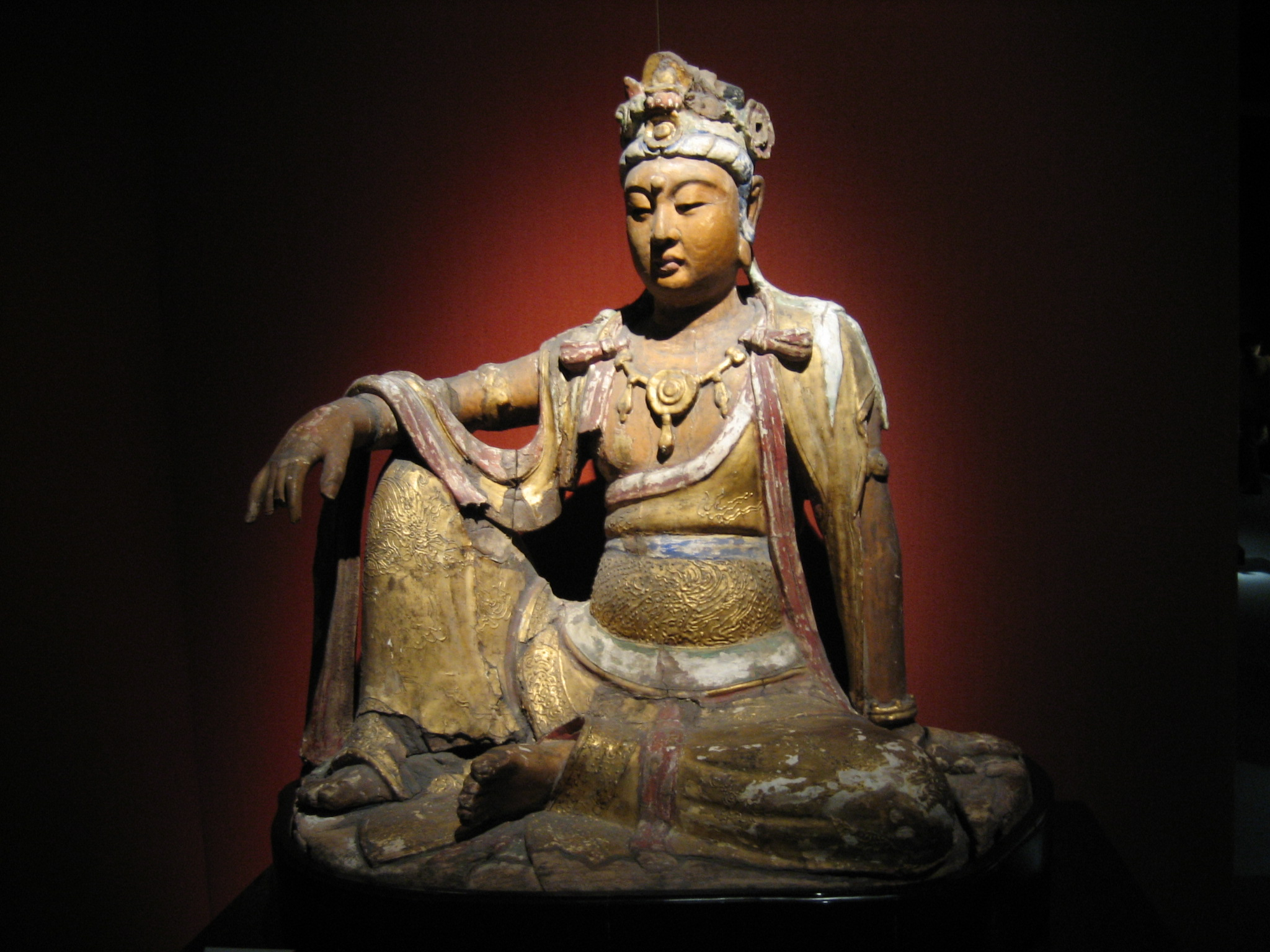
Wooden gilded statue of Avalokiteśvara, Song Dynasty (960–1279)

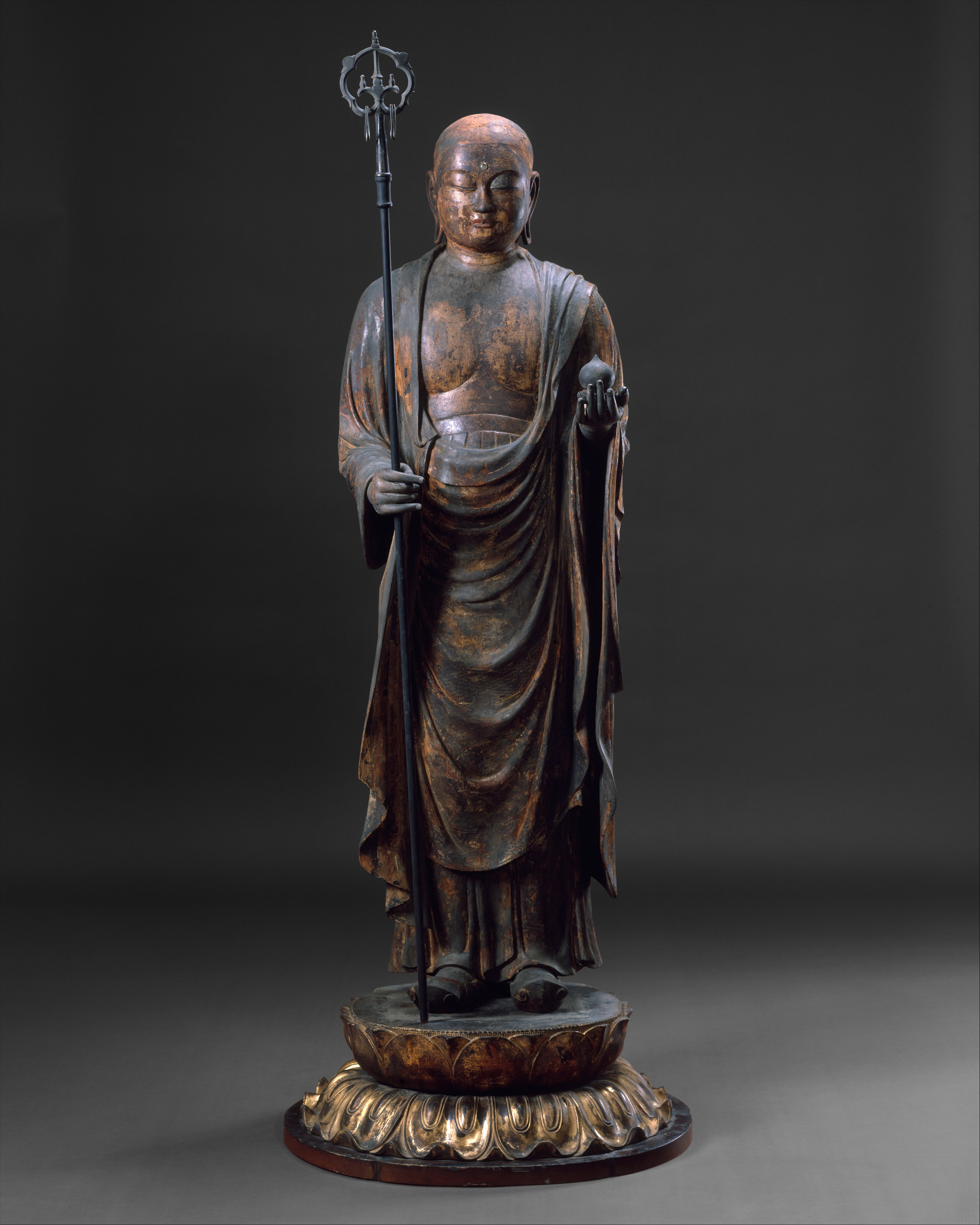
Jizō Bosatsu, Japan

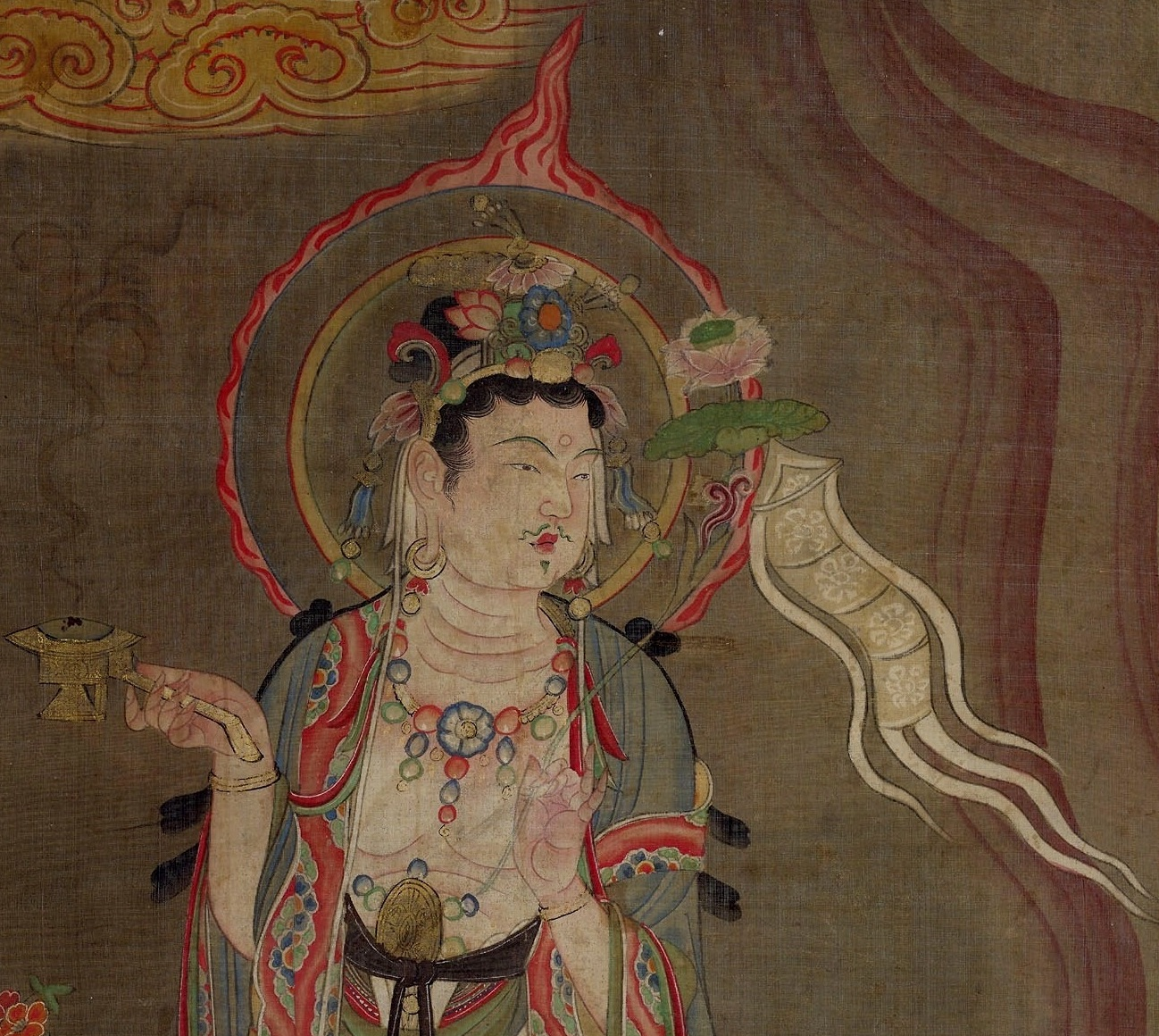
Bodhisattva painting at Dun Huang in the "1000 Buddha cave" (cave 17)

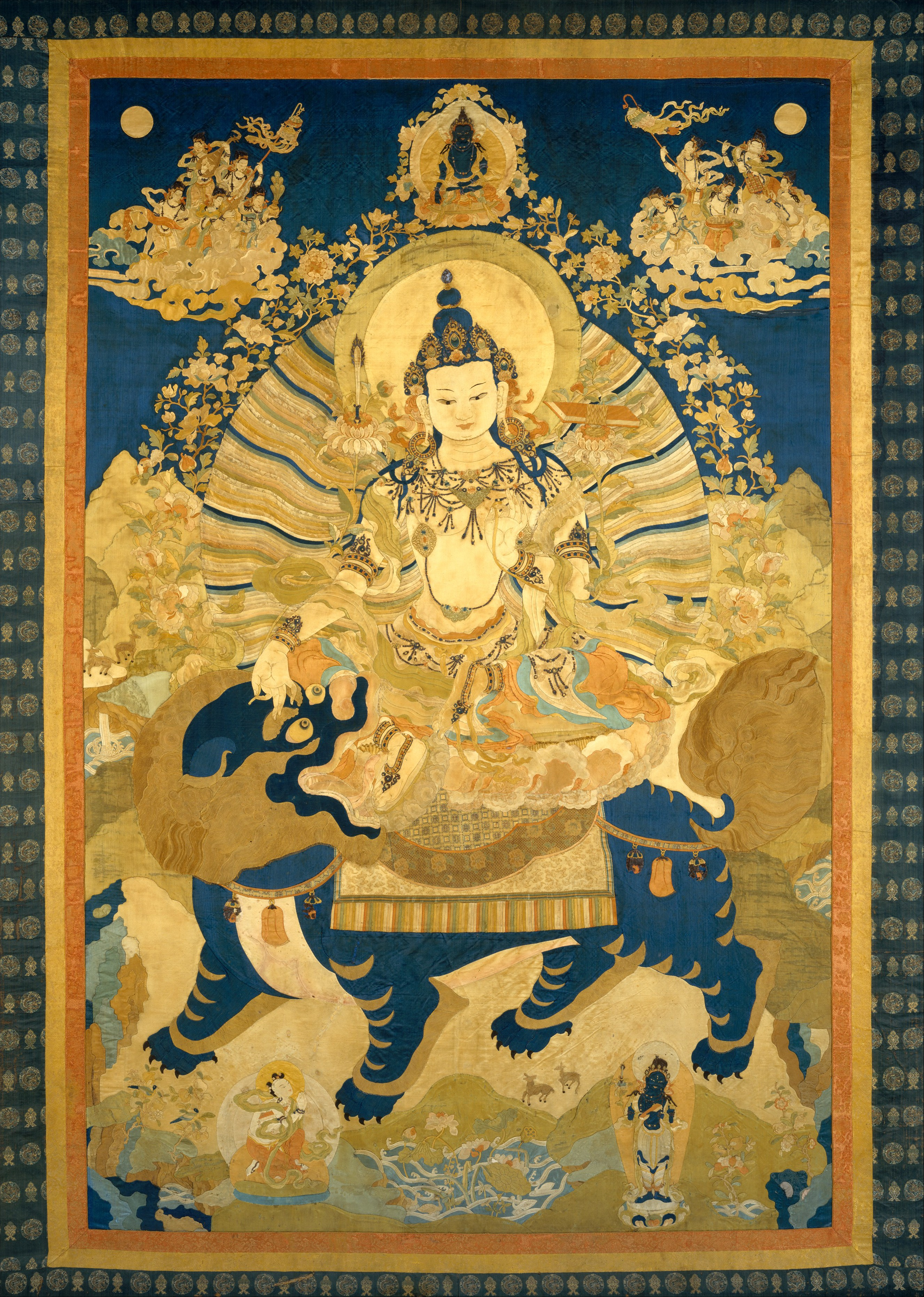
Manjushri, 17th–18th century China

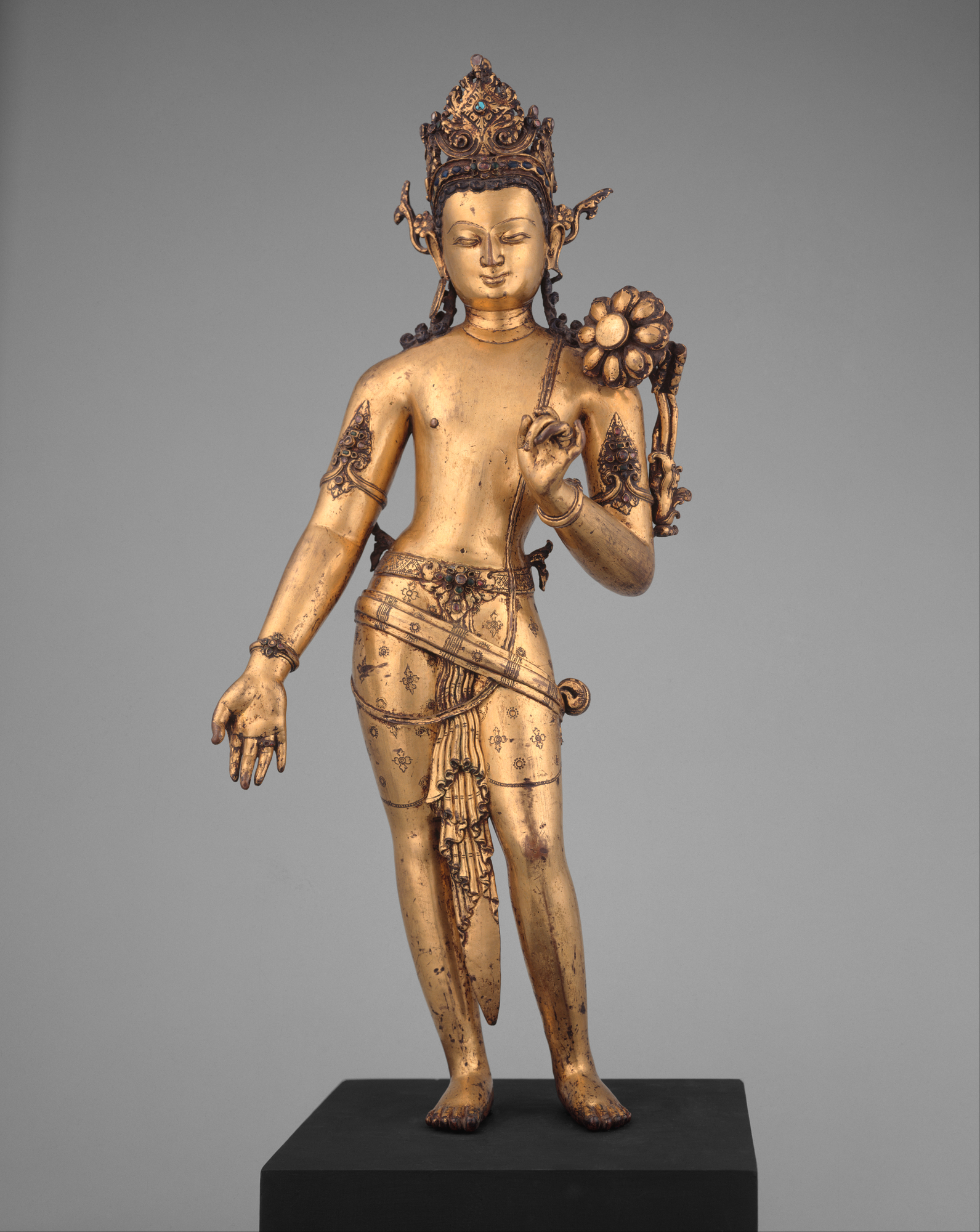
Padmapani Lokeshvara, Nepal, 11th century

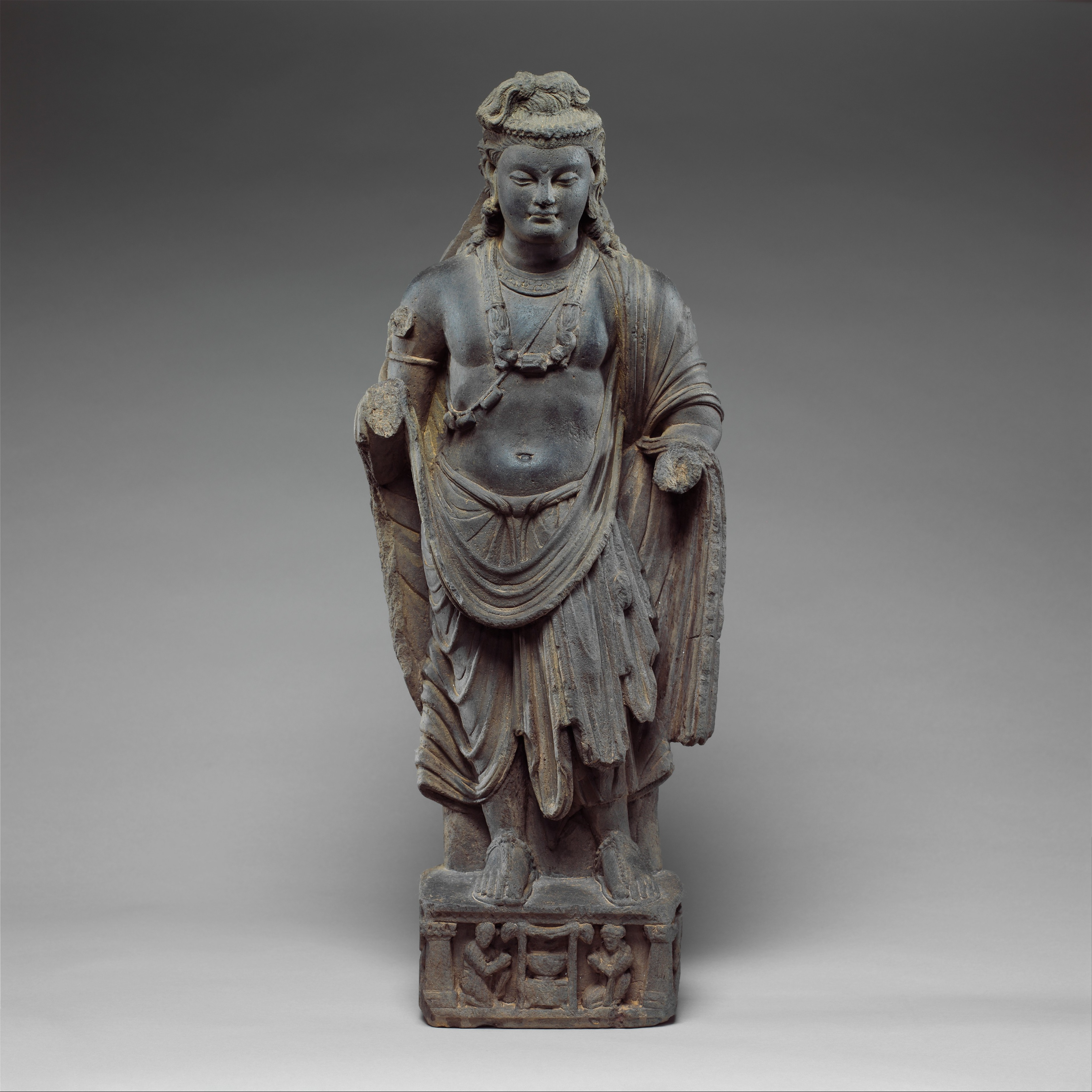
Standing Bodhisattva, probably Maitreya, Gandhara

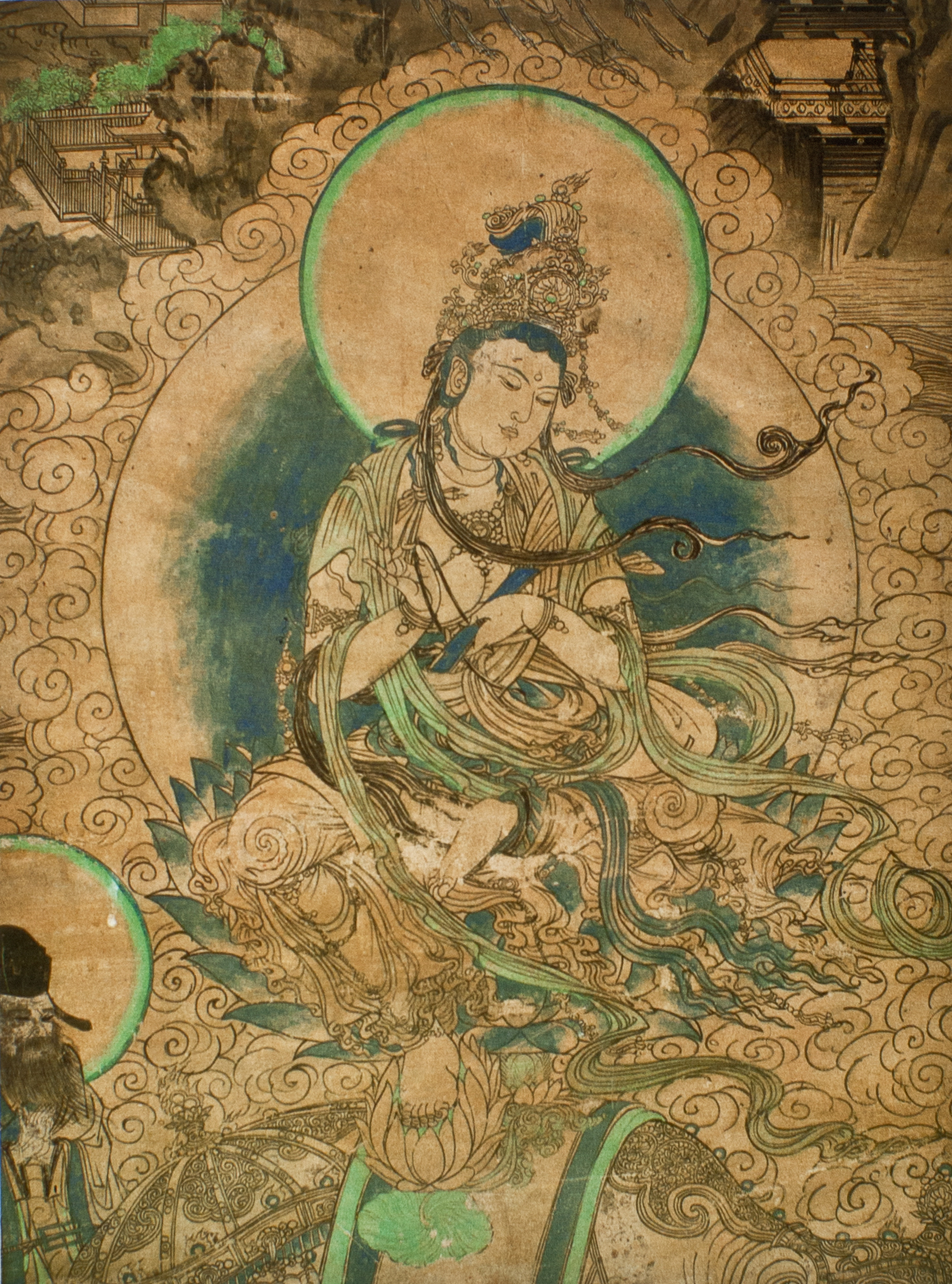
Samantabhadra, Yulin Cave 3, Western Xia

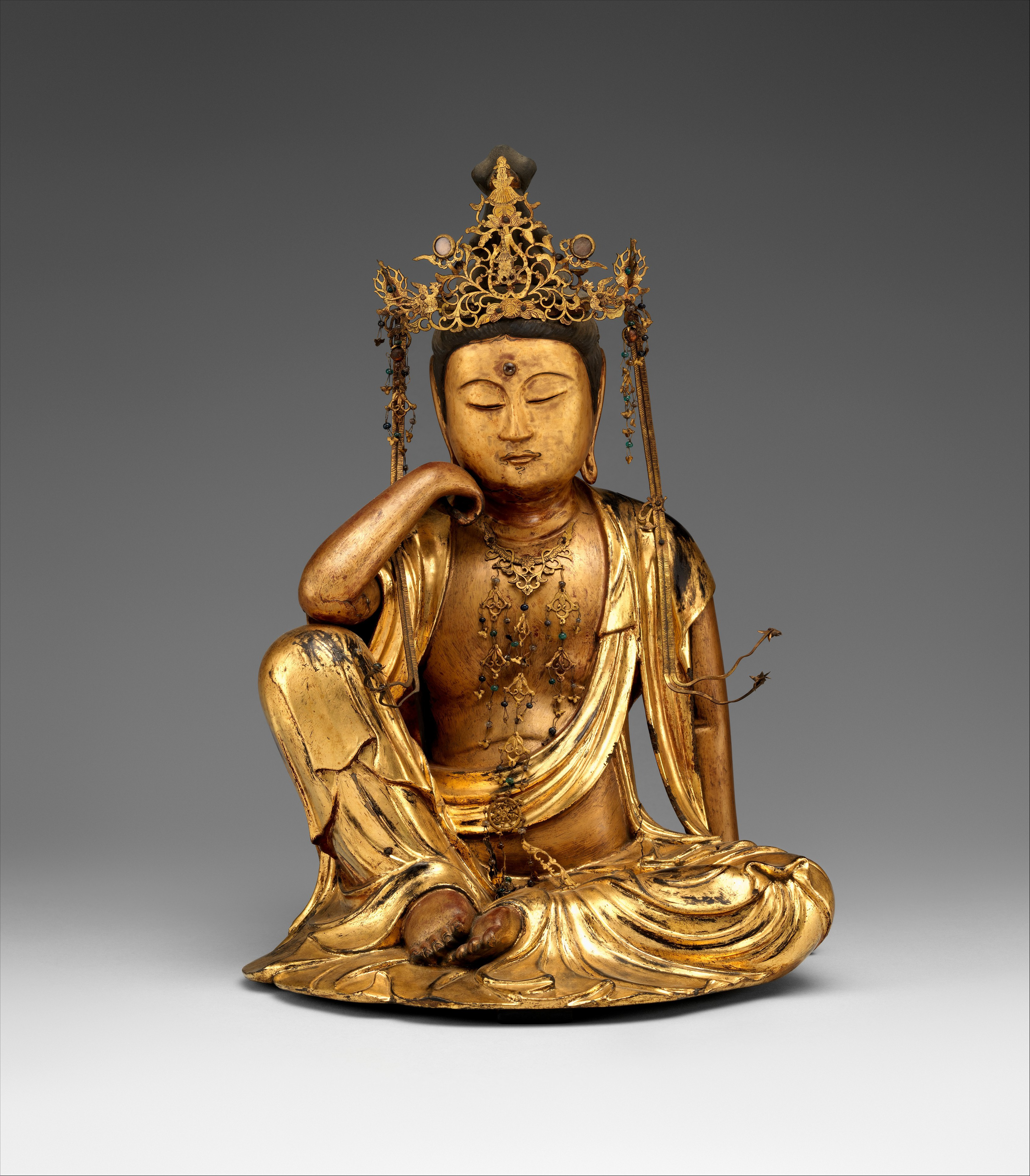
Nyoirin Kannon, Japan, 1693

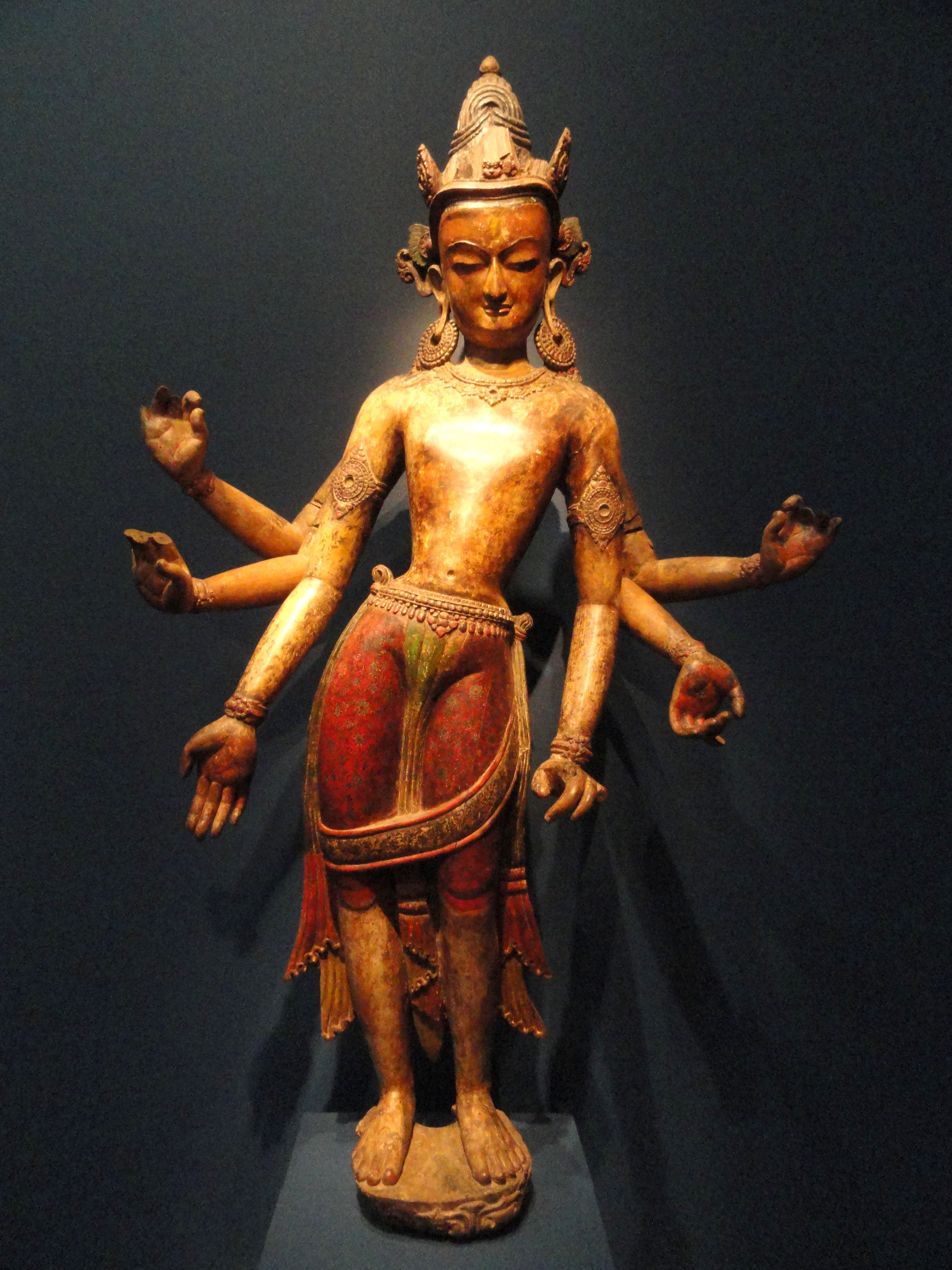
White Avalokiteshvara (Amoghapasha Lokeshvara), 14th century, Nepal

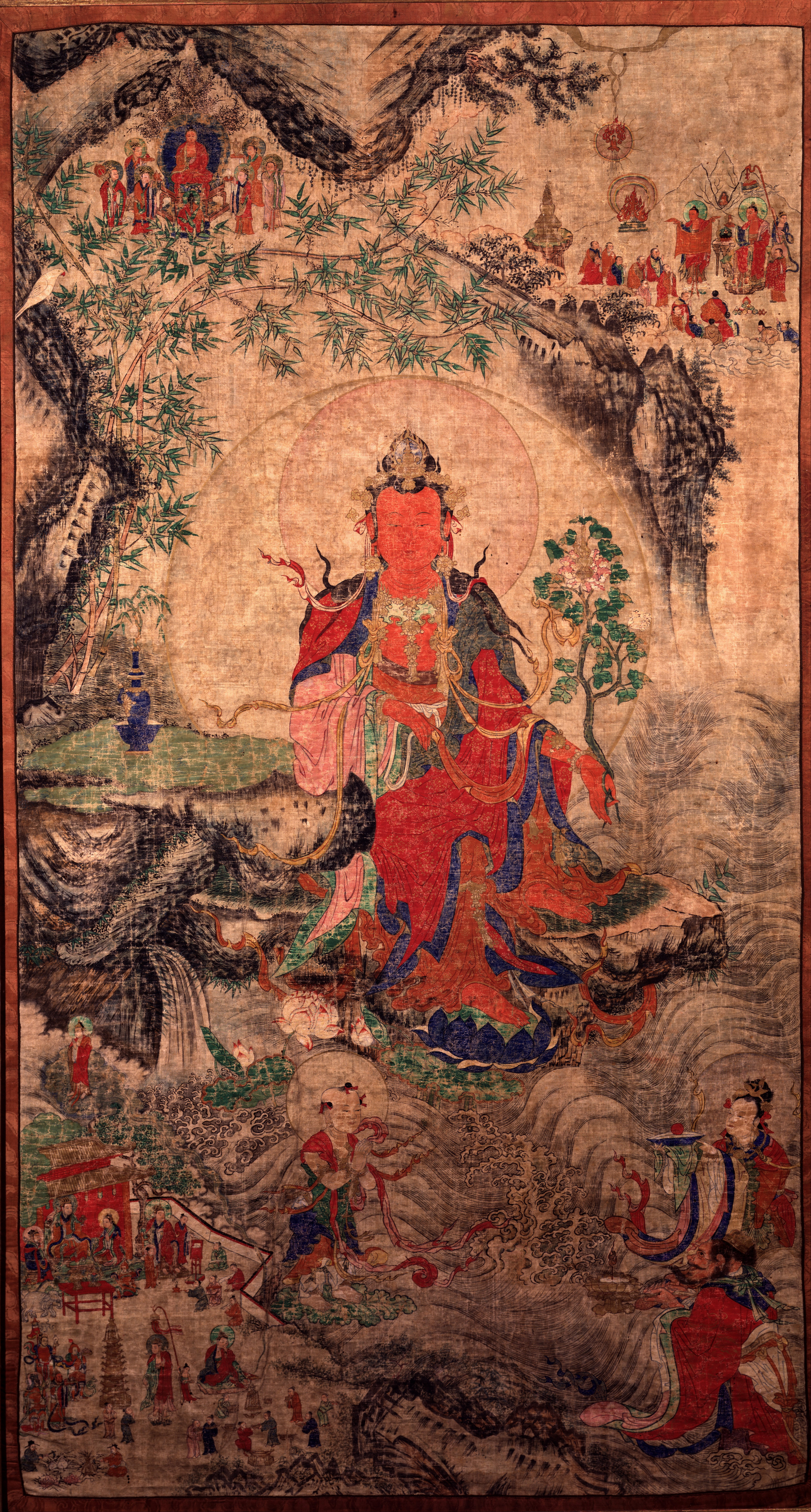
Maitreya, Himalayan, 15th century

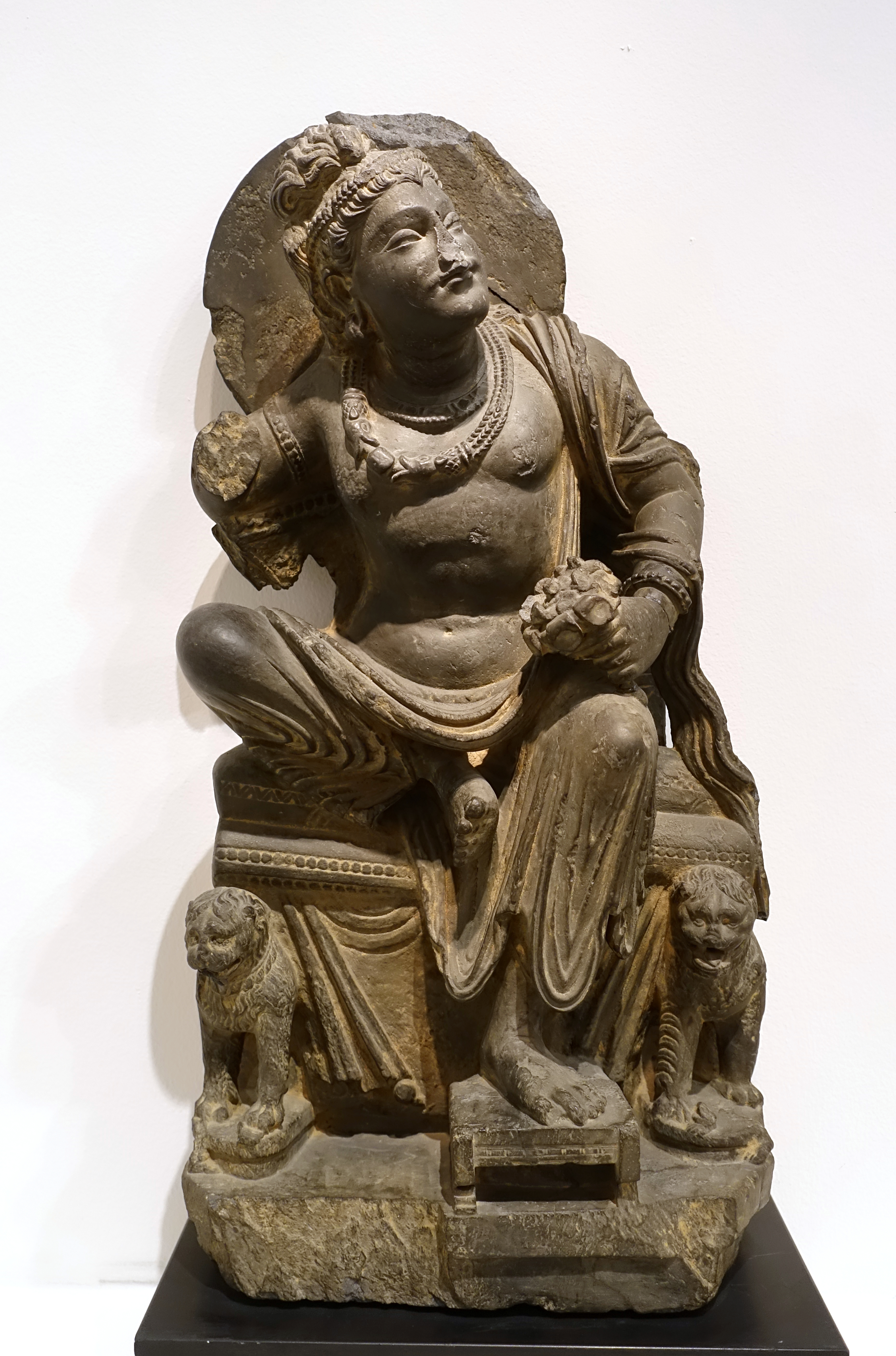
Padmapani, India, Gandharan period, 200s CE, schist

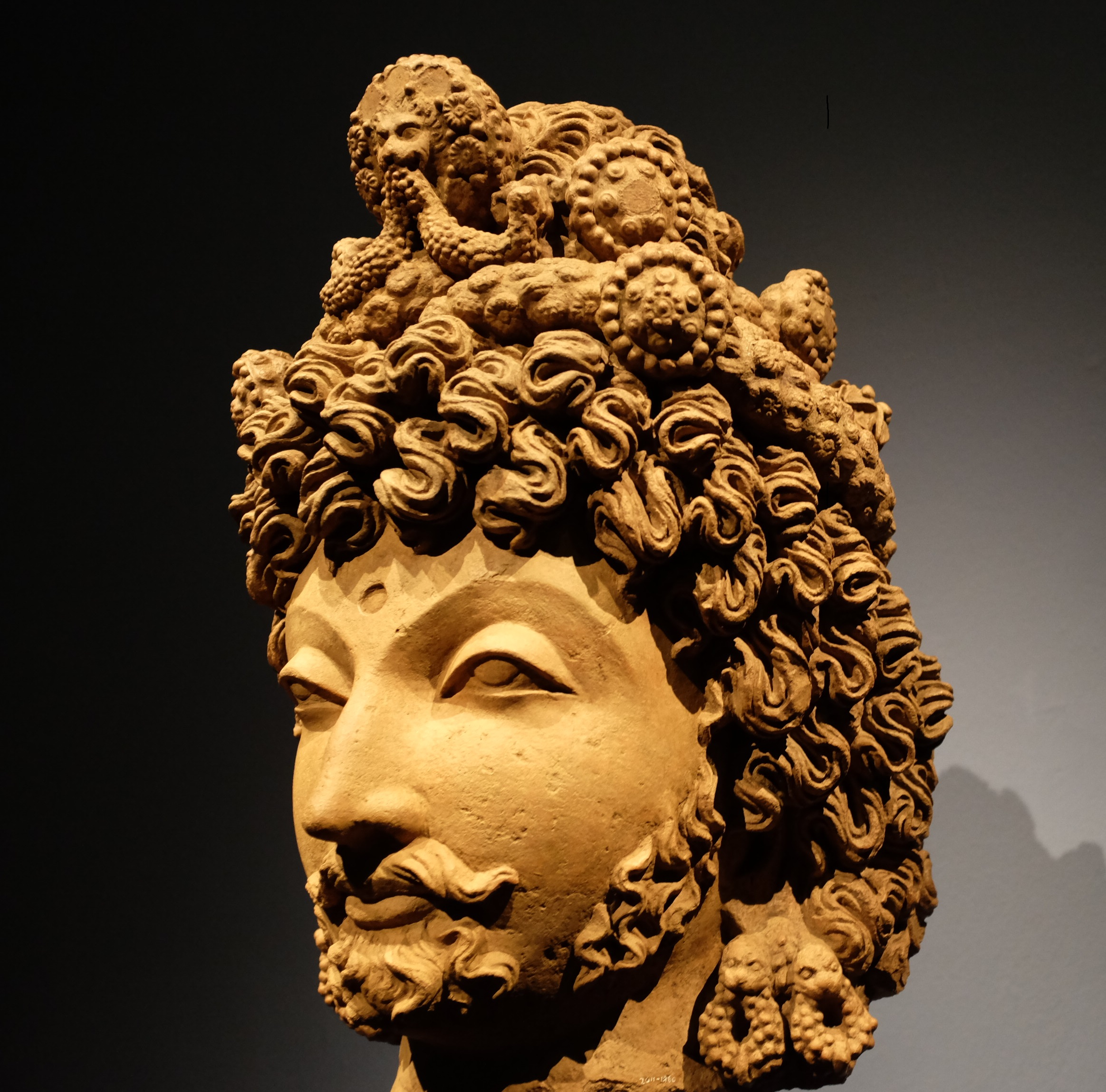
Gandharan sculpture, head of a bodhisattva

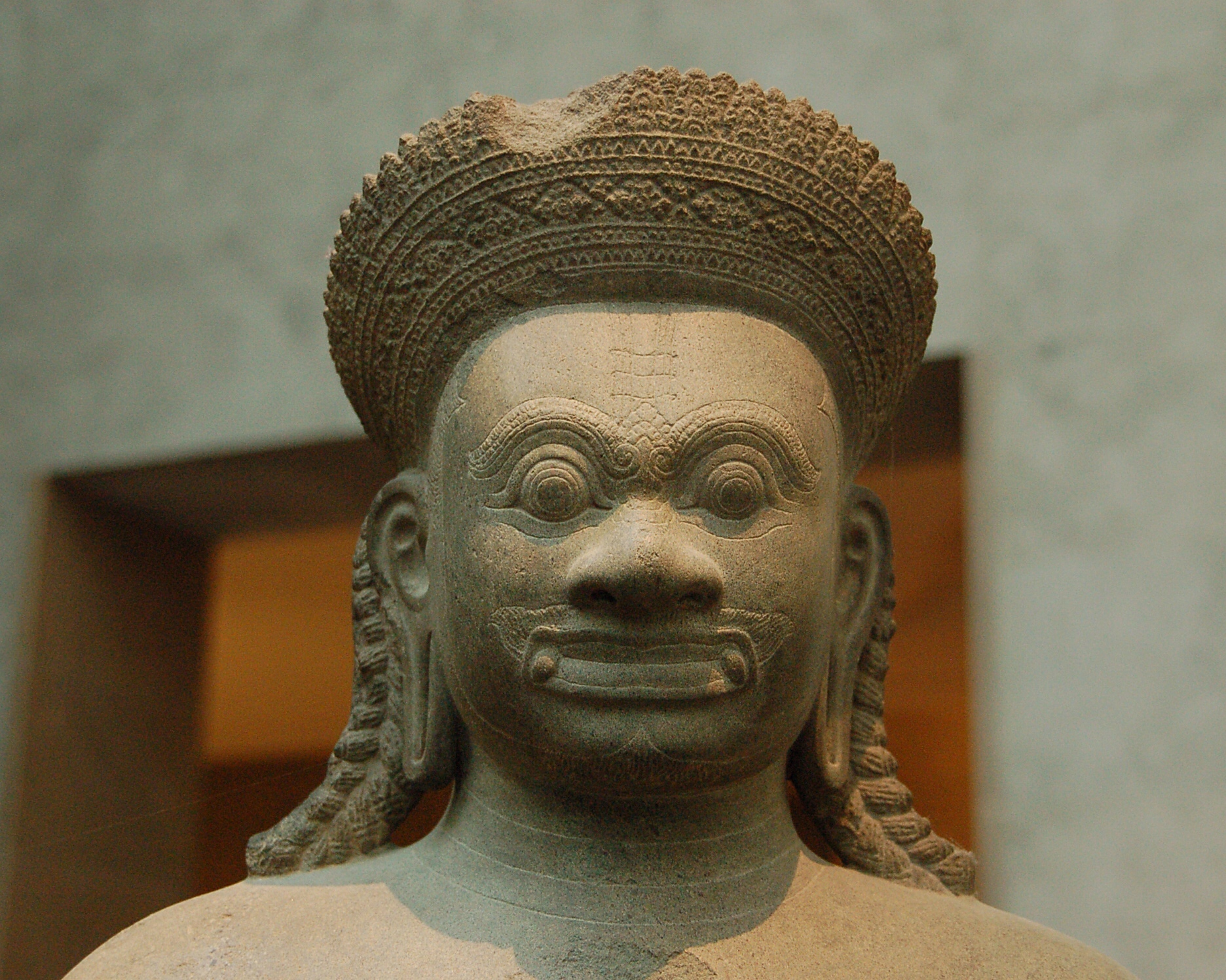
Vajrapani, Cambodia, 10th century

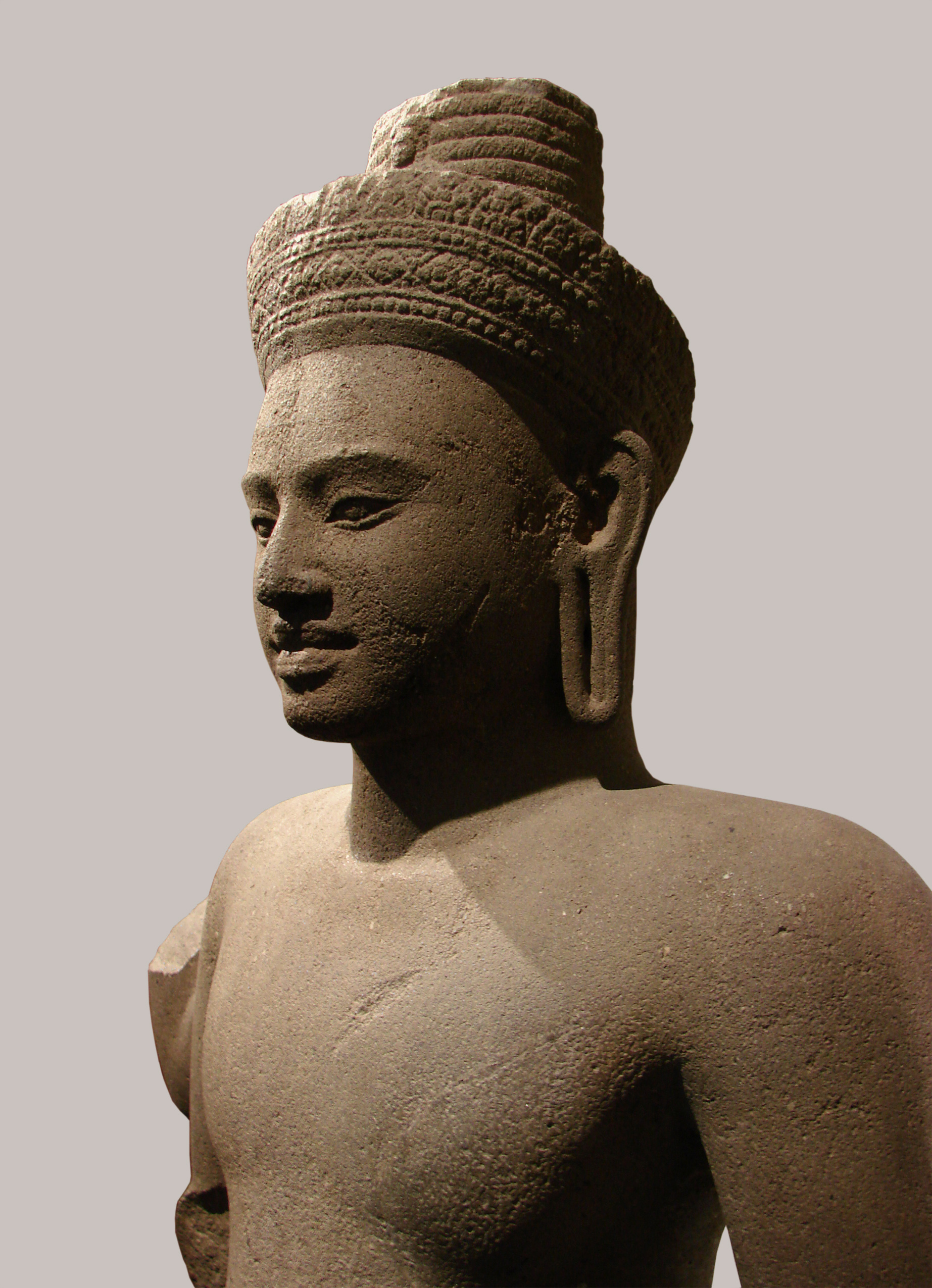
Lokesvara, Cambodia, 10th–11th century

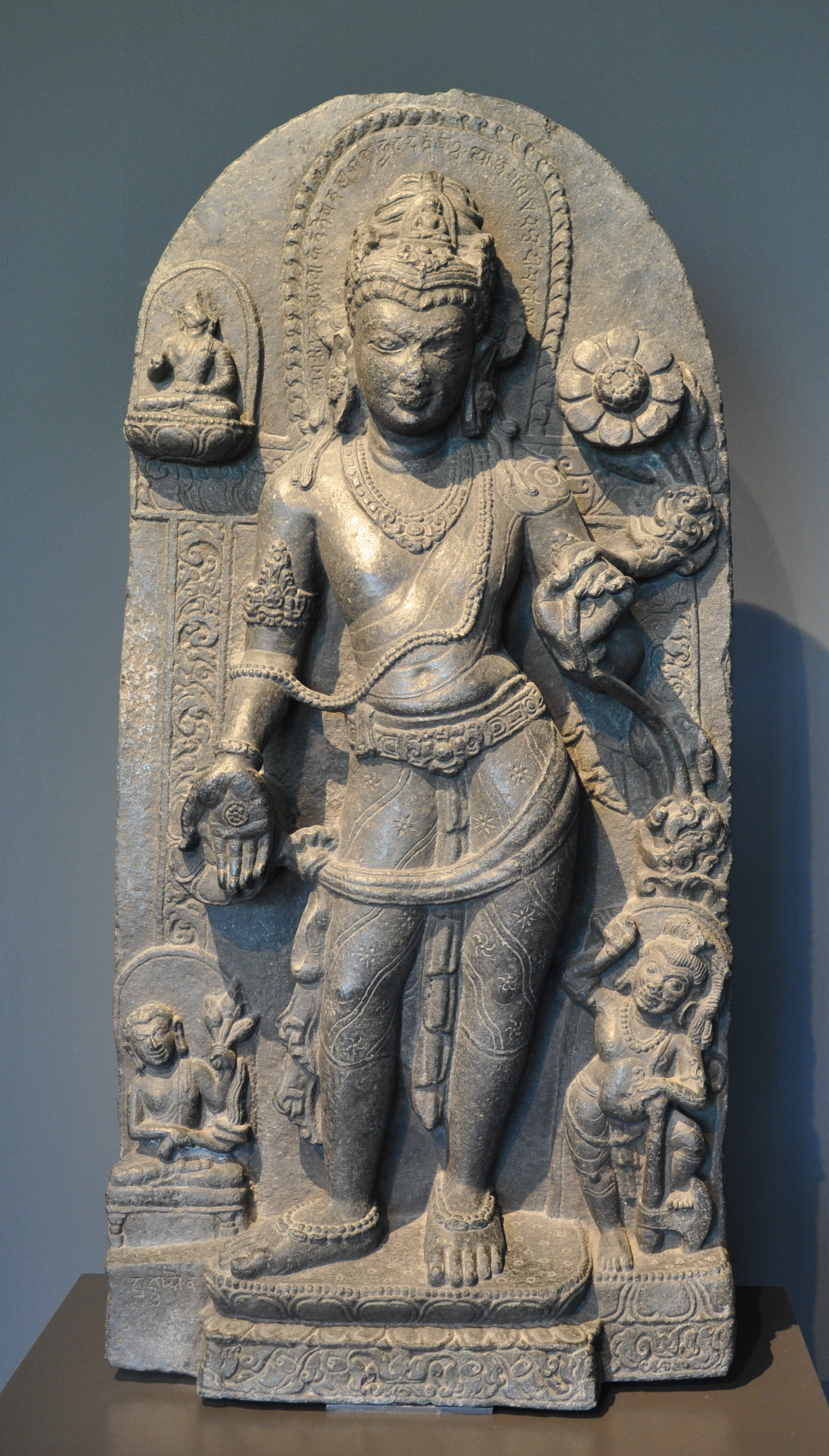
Lokeshvara, Bihar, Teladha Vihara

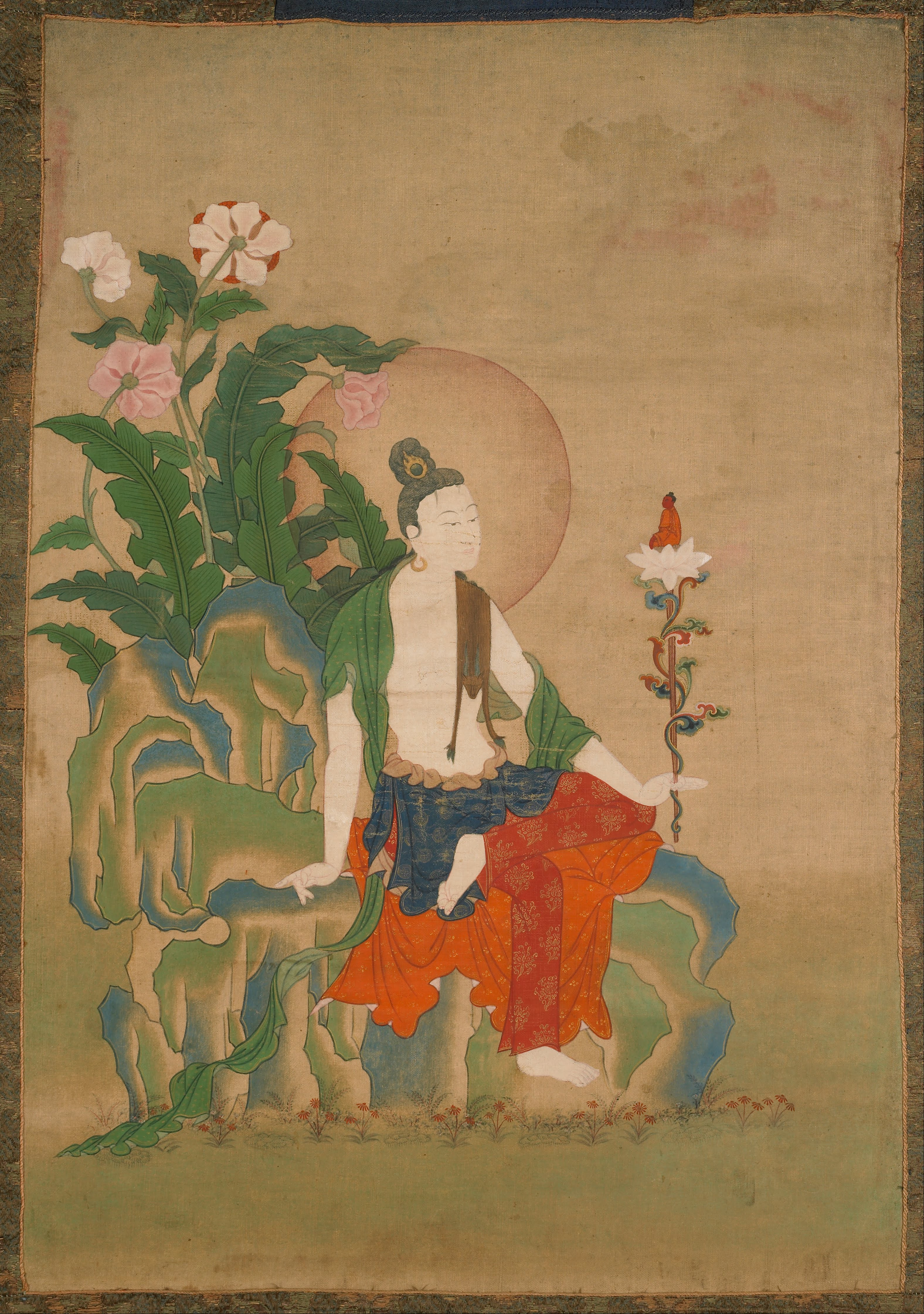
Avalokiteshvara, 18th century

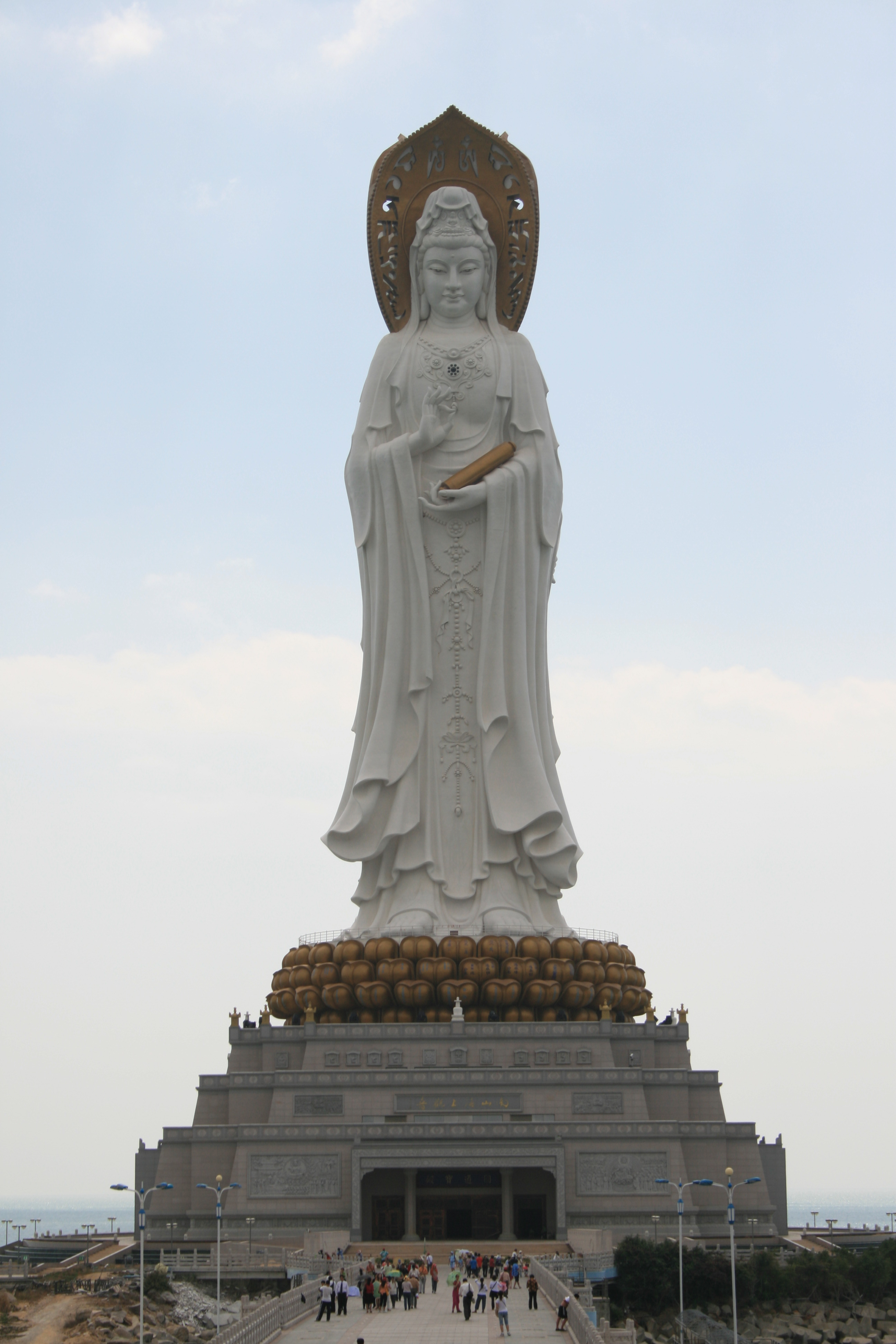
Guanyin Statue, Nanshan Guanyin Park

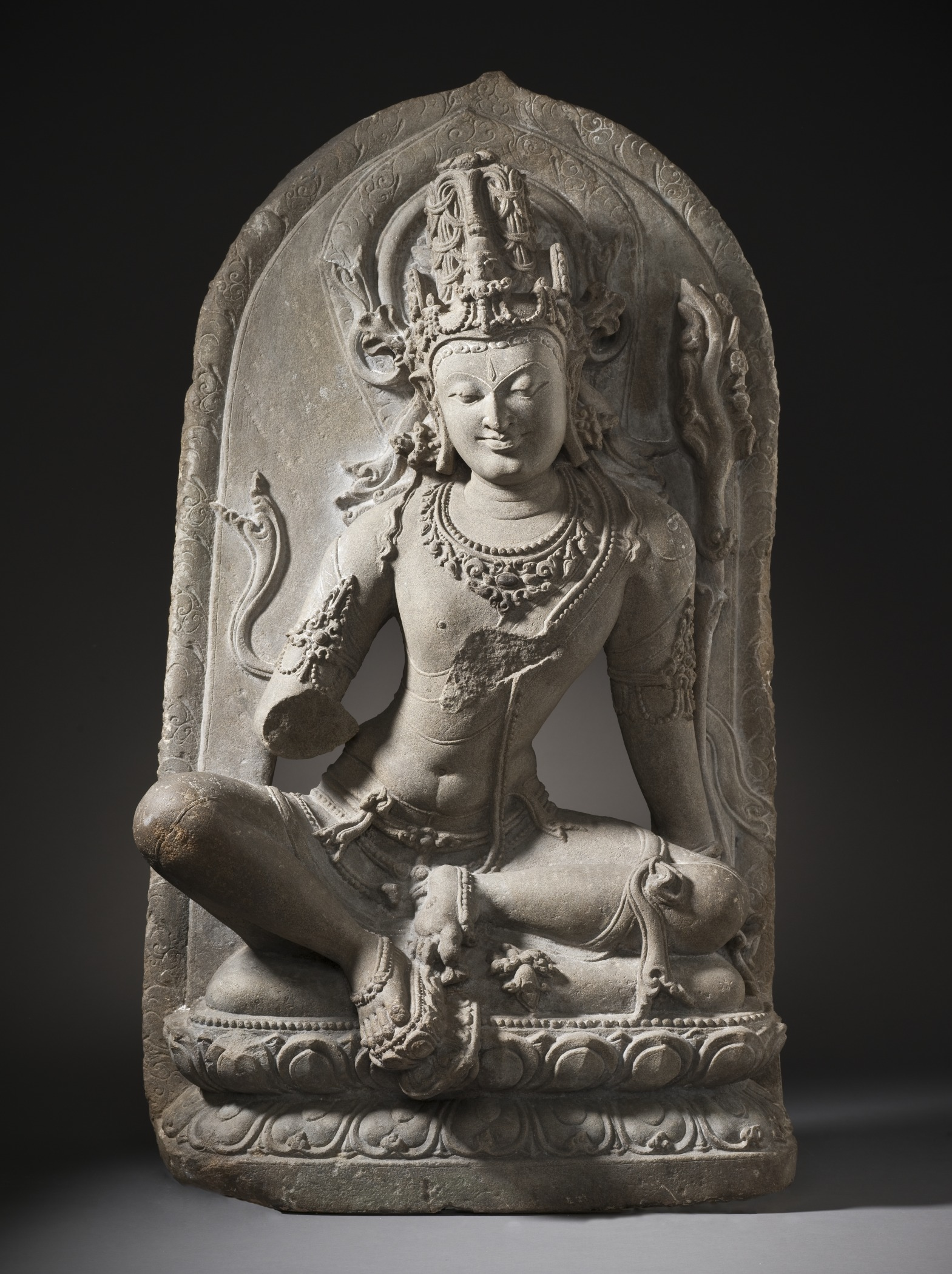
Maitreya, Bihar, Gaya District, 11th century

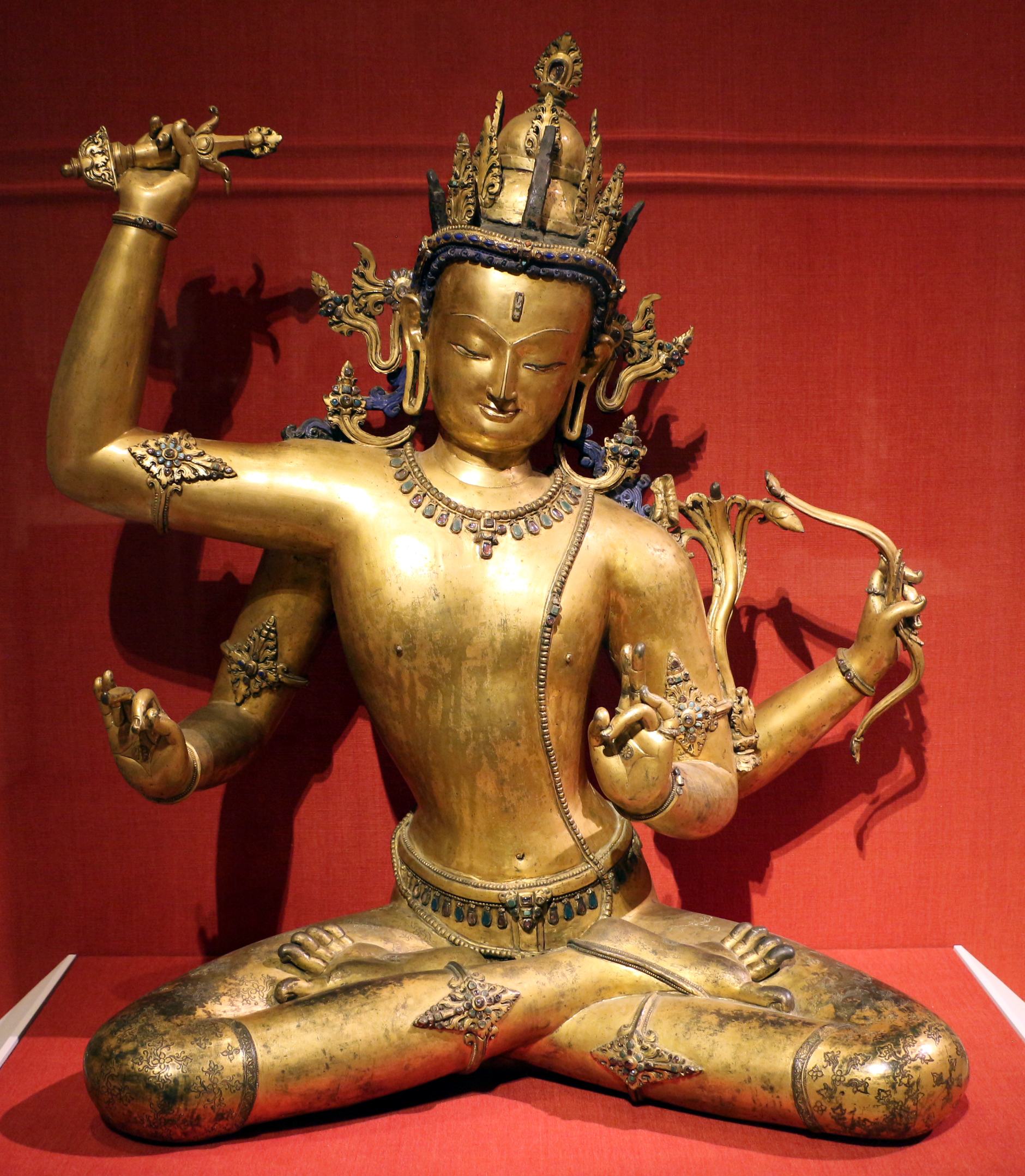
Manjusri, Nepal, 15th century

== See also ==
- Bodhicharyavatara (A Guide to the Bodhisattva Way of Life)
- Bodhisattvas of the Earth
- Bodhisattva vows
- Buddhist holidays
- Junzi
- Karuna (compassion in Sanskrit)
- List of bodhisattvas
- Vegetarianism in Buddhism
