= Bhikkhu =

Buddhist monk

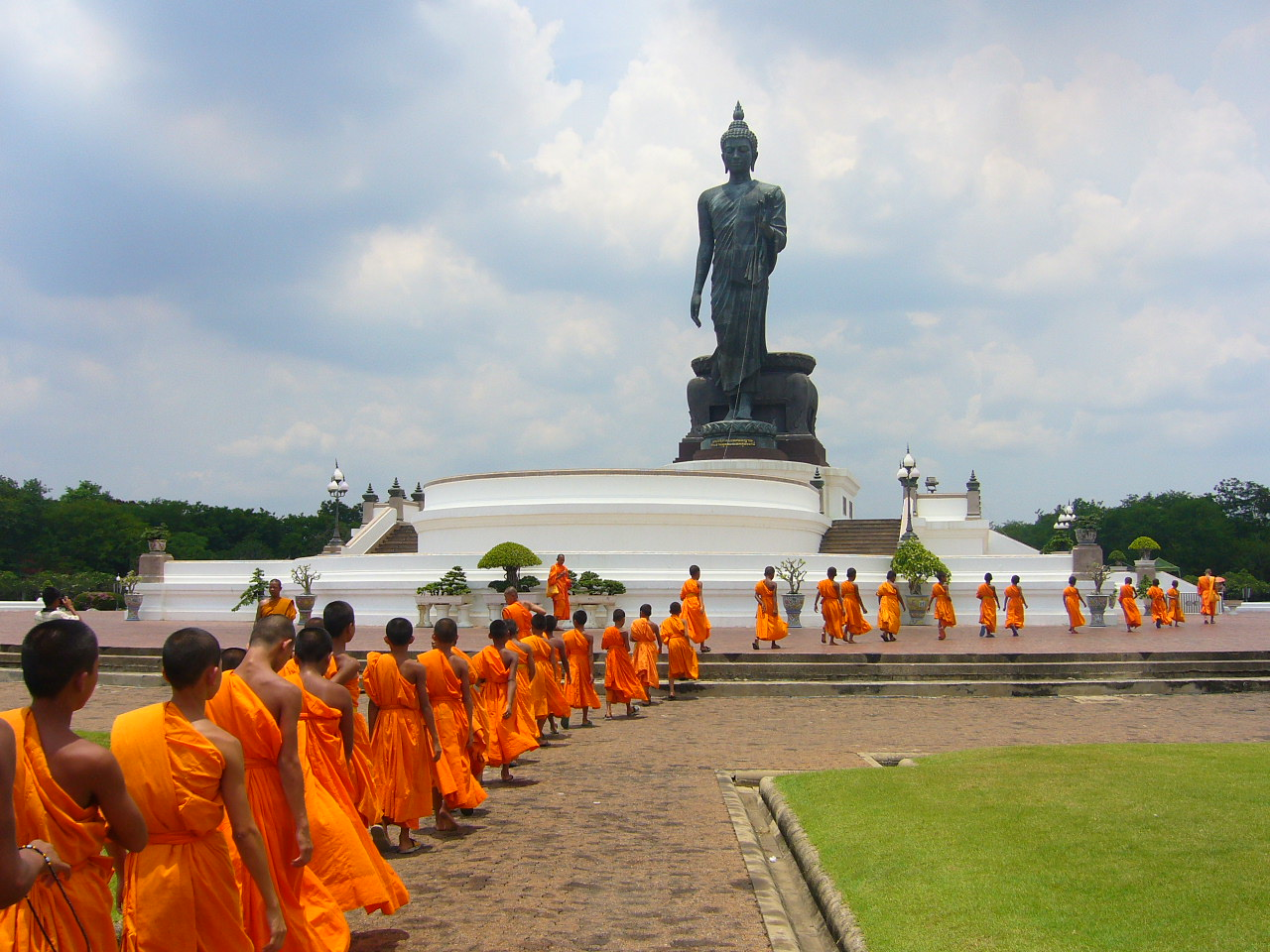
- Bhikkhus in Phutthamonthon, Thailand

Chinese name
- Chinese: 比丘
Transcriptions
Standard Mandarin
- Hanyu Pinyin: bǐqiū
- Wade–Giles: Pi^{3}-ch'iu^{1}

Native Chinese name
- Chinese: 和尚、僧侶
Transcriptions
Standard Mandarin
- Hanyu Pinyin: héshàng, sēnglǚ
- Wade–Giles: he^{2}-shang^{4}

Burmese name
- Burmese: ဘိက္ခု

Tibetan name
- Tibetan: དགེ་སློང་
Transcriptions
- Wylie: dge slong
- THL: gelong

Vietnamese name
- Vietnamese alphabet: Tì-kheo (Tỉ-khâu); Tăng lữ
- Chữ Hán: 比丘 僧侣

Thai name
- Thai: ภิกษุ
- RTGS: phiksu

Mongolian name
- Mongolian Cyrillic: Гэлэн
- Mongolian script: ᠭᠡᠯᠦᠩ
Transcriptions
- SASM/GNC: gelüng

Japanese name
- Kanji: 僧、比丘
Transcriptions
- Romanization: Sō, biku

Bengali name
- Bengali: ভিক্ষু (Bhikkhu)

Tamil name
- Tamil: துறவி, tuṟavi

Sanskrit name
- Sanskrit: भिक्षु (Bhikṣu)

Pali name
- Pali: Bhikkhu

Khmer name
- Khmer: ភិក្ខុ UNGEGN: Phĭkkhŏ; ALA-LC: Bhikkhu

Nepali name
- Nepali: भिक्षु

Sinhala name
- Sinhala: භික්ෂුව

Telugu name
- Telugu: భిక్షువు, bhikṣuvu

Odia name
- Odia: ଭିକ୍ଷୁ, Bhikhyu

A bhikkhu (Pali: भिक्खु; Sanskrit: भिक्षु, romanized: bhikṣu) is an ordained male in Buddhist monasticism. Male and female monastics (bhikkhunī) are members of the Sangha (Buddhist community).

The lives of all Buddhist monastics are governed by a set of rules called the prātimokṣa or pātimokkha. Their lifestyles are shaped to support their spiritual practice: to live a simple and meditative life and attain nirvana.

A person under the age of 20 cannot be ordained as a bhikkhu or bhikkhuni but can be ordained as a śrāmaṇera or śrāmaṇērī.

== Definition ==
Bhikkhu literally means "beggar" or "one who lives by alms". The historical Buddha, Prince Siddhartha, having abandoned a life of pleasure and status, lived as an alms mendicant as part of his śramaṇa lifestyle. Those of his more serious students who renounced their lives as householders and came to study full-time under his supervision also adopted this lifestyle. These full-time student members of the sangha became the community of ordained monastics who wandered from town to city throughout the year, living off alms and stopping in one place only for the Vassa, the rainy months of the monsoon season.

In the Dhammapada commentary of Buddhaghoṣa, a bhikkhu is defined as "the person who sees danger (in samsara or the cycle of rebirth)" (Pāli: Bhayaṃ ikkhatīti: bhikkhu). Therefore, he seeks ordination to obtain release from the cycle of rebirth. The Dhammapada states:

[266–267] He is not a monk just because he lives on others' alms. Not by adopting outward form does one become a true monk. Whoever here (in the Dispensation) lives a holy life, transcending both merit and demerit, and walks with understanding in this world—he is truly called a monk.

Buddha accepted female bhikkhunis after his step-mother Mahapajapati Gotami organized a women's march to Vesāli and Buddha requested her to accept the Eight Garudhammas. Gotami agreed to accept the Eight Garudhammas and was accorded the status of the first bhikkhuni. Subsequent women had to undergo full ordination to become nuns.

== Ordination ==
The bhikkhu order, in its earliest form, upheld continuous movement for eight months a year, and ate one meal a day received from begging. Generally, those who want to be ordained have to be 21 years old.

=== Theravada ===
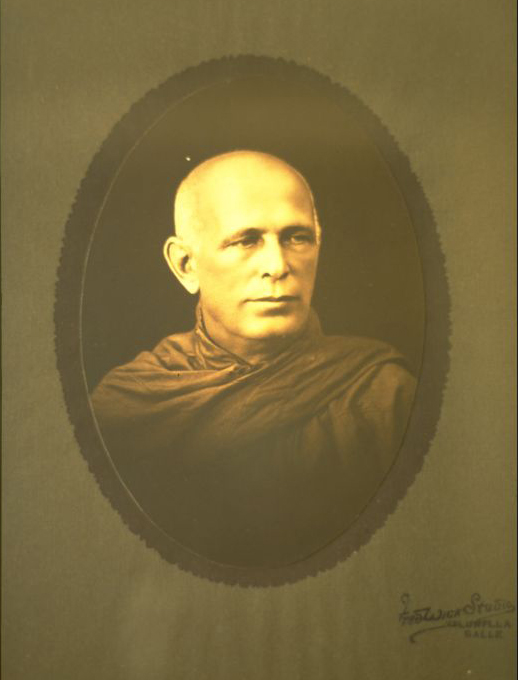
One of the earliest Western Buddhist monks, Ven Nyanatiloka Mahathera from Germany

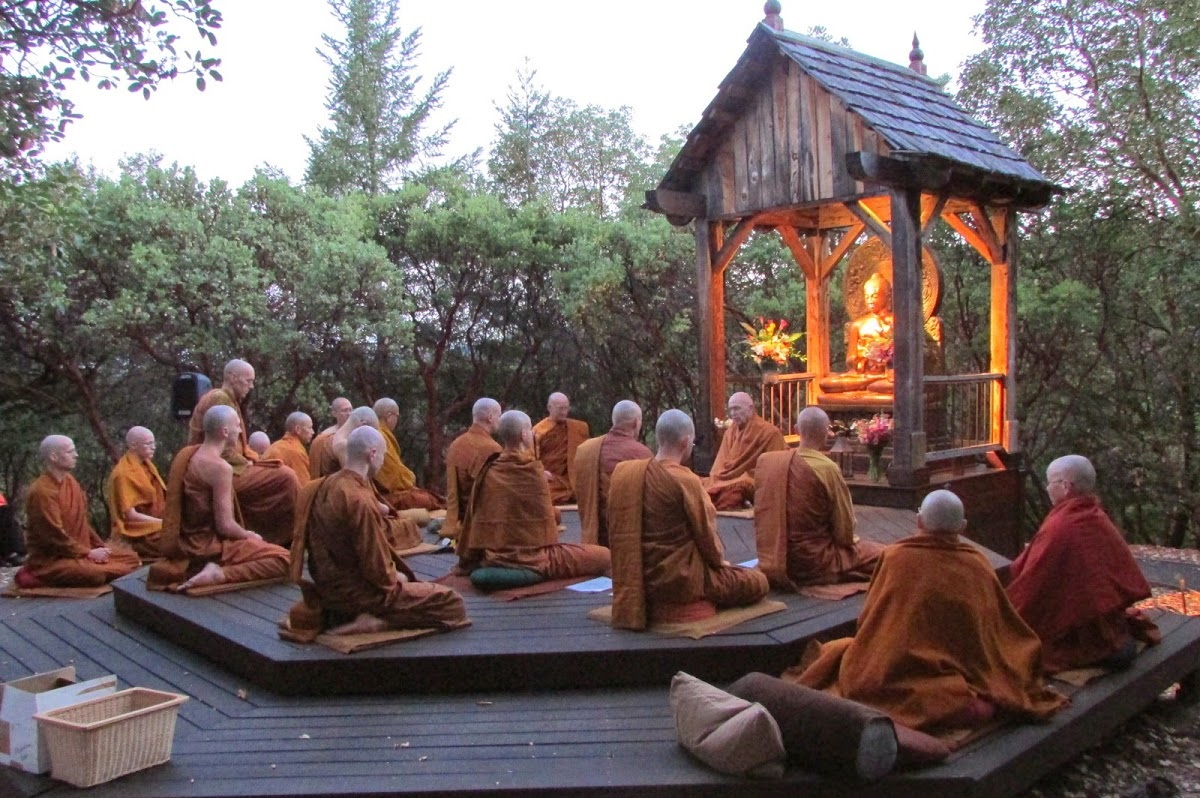
Theravadin monks at Abhayagiri Buddhist Monastery in United States

Theravada monasticism is organized around the guidelines found within a division of the Pāli Canon called the Vinaya Pitaka. Lay followers will undergo ordination as a novitiate (śrāmaṇera or sāmanera) in a rite known as the "going forth" (Pali: pabbajja). Sāmaneras are subject to the Ten Precepts. From there full ordination (Pali: upasampada) may take place. Bhikkhus are subject to a much longer set of rules known as the Pātimokkha (Theravada) or Prātimokṣa (Mahayana and Vajrayana).

=== Mahayana ===
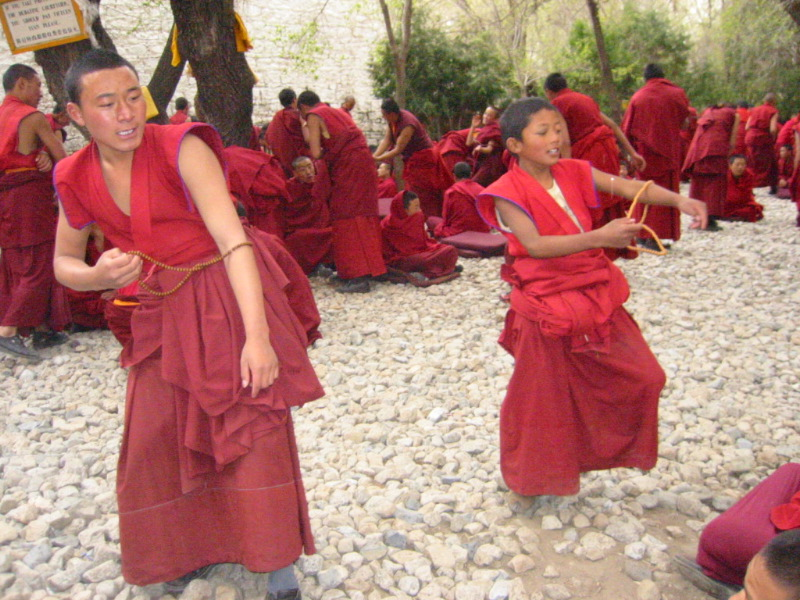
Tibetan monks, all of whom ordain under the Mulasarvastivada Vinaya

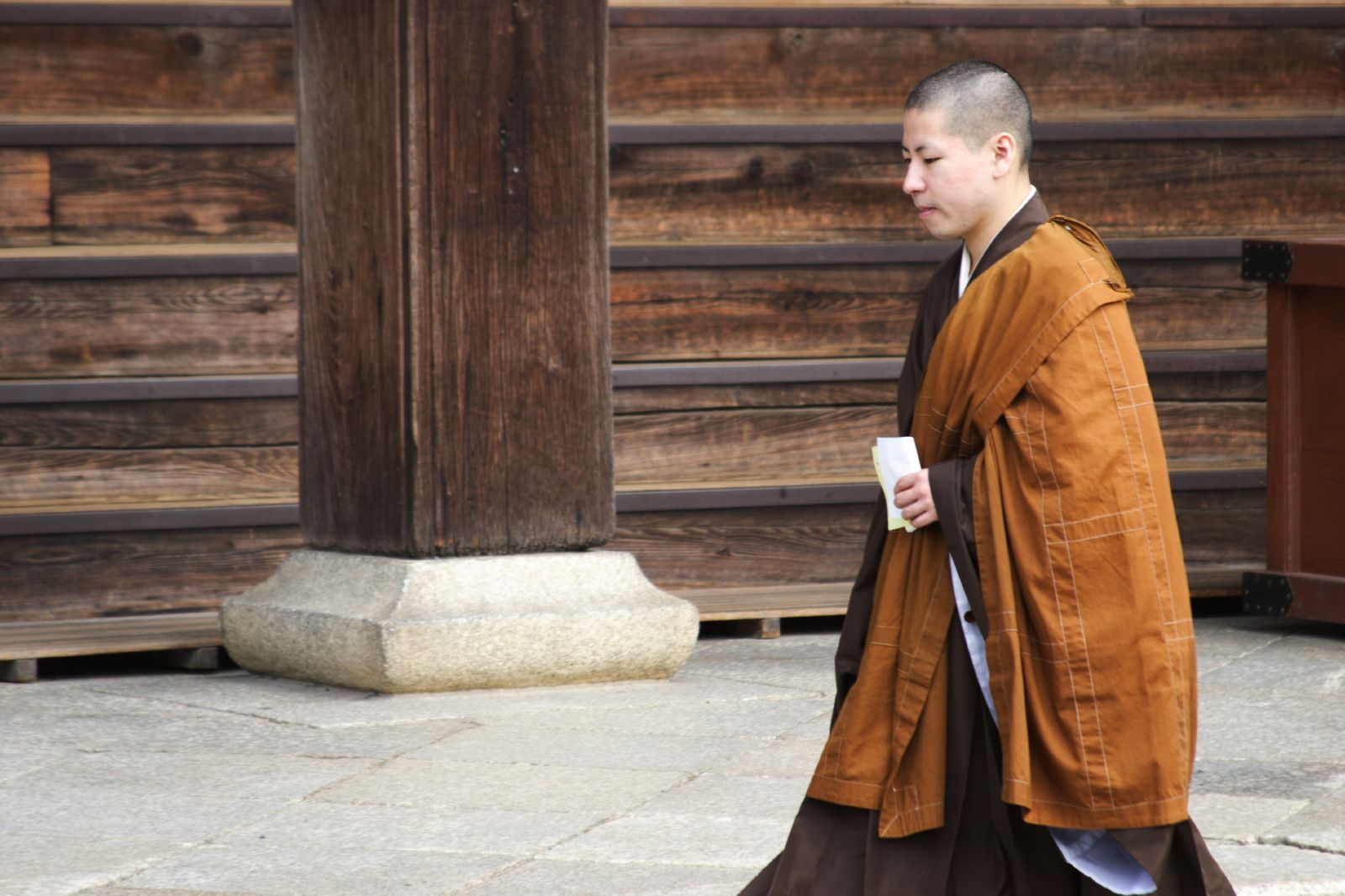
Jōdo monk at Chion-in, Kyoto. The Jōdo-shū sect follows a bodhisattva precept ordination that does not rely on the Vinaya precepts

In Mahayana Buddhism, Vinaya based monasticism is part of the system of "vows of individual liberation". These vows are traditionally taken by monks and nuns from the ordinary sangha, in order to develop personal ethical discipline. East Asian Buddhism generally follows the Dharmaguptaka Vinaya, while Tibetan Buddhism's monastic sangha follows the Mulasarvastivada Vinaya.

In Mahayana and Vajrayana traditions like Tibetan Buddhism, the term "sangha" is, at the highest level, often understood to refer particularly to the aryasangha (Wylie: mchog kyi tshogs), the "community of the noble ones who have reached the first [bodhisattva] bhūmi". These need not be monks and nuns per se. Nevertheless, most traditional Mahayana communities maintain Vinaya ordination, with the exception of most of Japanese Buddhism (see below).

Traditionally, the vows of individual liberation are taken in four levels. A lay person may take the five upāsaka and upāsikā vows (Wylie: dge snyan (ma), "approaching virtue"). The next step is to enter the pabbajja or monastic way of life (Skt: pravrajyā, Wylie: rab byung), which includes wearing monk's or nun's robes. After that, one can become a samanera or samaneri "novice" (Skt. śrāmaṇera, śrāmaṇeri, Wylie: dge tshul, dge tshul ma). The final step is to take all the vows of a bhikkhu or bhikkhuni "fully ordained monastic" (Sanskrit: bhikṣu, bhikṣuṇī, Wylie: dge long (ma)).

Monastics take their vows for life but can renounce them and return to non-monastic life and even take the vows again later. A person can take them up to three times or seven times in one life, depending on the particular practices of each school of discipline; after that, the sangha should not accept them again. In this way, Buddhism keeps the vows "clean". It is possible to keep them or to leave this lifestyle, but breaking these vows requires confession and expiation.

In Tibetan Buddhism, the upāsaka, pravrajyā and bhikṣu ordinations are traditionally taken at ages six, fourteen and twenty-one or older, respectively. Tibetan Buddhism also includes a system of non-celibate clergy, called Ngakpas. These Tibetan clergy may still be called "lamas", but they do not follow the monastic Vinaya precepts. Nevertheless, all Tibetan Buddhists may still take additional vows not related to Vinaya ordination, including the Bodhisattva vows, tantric samaya vows and others, which are also open to laypersons in most instances.

==== In Japanese Buddhism ====
In the 9th century Japan, the monk Saichō believed that the 250 Vinaya precepts were no longer able to be maintained. Since he held they had been primarily taught for the Śrāvakayāna, and they had become too difficult to keep during the age of Dharma decline, he promoted a form of monastic ordination that relied only on the Mahayana bodhisattva precepts of the Brahmajala Sutra. Saichō stipulated that the monastics of his new Tendai school would remain on Mount Hiei for twelve years of isolated training and follow the major themes of the 250 precepts: celibacy, non-harming, no intoxicants, vegetarian eating and reducing labor for gain. After twelve years, monastics would then use the Vinaya precepts as provisional or supplemental guidelines when serving in non-monastic communities.

As such, the Tendai school developed an ordination system that did not rely on the traditional Vinaya precepts, marking a radical break with Buddhist monastic tradition. During the Kamakura period (1185 to 1333), various other Buddhist schools were founded by Tendai monastics, including the Jōdo-shū, Sōtō Zen and Nichiren. These new sects, who would later become some of the largest schools of Buddhism in Japan, also followed the Tendai model of bodhisattva precepts.

During Japan's Meiji Restoration (1870s), the government abolished celibacy and vegetarianism for Buddhist monastics in an effort to secularise them and promote the newly created State Shinto. This changed the ordination practices of all sects, who had to abandon the adherence to the Vinaya. As such, the tradition of ordaining true Buddhist monks and nuns who adhere to the Vinaya has been effectively lost in Japanese Buddhism. In contemporary Japanese Buddhism, non-celibate clergy are commonly referred to by terms like sōryo (僧侶), and are regarded as distinct from bhikkhu, known in Japanese as biku (比丘). While often labeled “monks” and "nuns" in English, some consider it offensive and misleading to refer to non-celibate Buddhist clergy by these term, as it conflates them with bhikkhu and bhikkhuni. In English, non-celibate Buddhist clergy may be referred to as “priests” or "priestesses" to distinguish them from actual monks (bhikkhu) and nuns (bhikkhuni).

==== Korean Buddhism ====
After the Japan–Korea Treaty of 1910, when Japan annexed Korea, Korean Buddhism underwent many changes. Jōdo Shinshū and Nichiren schools began sending missionaries to Korea under Japanese rule and new sects formed there such as Won Buddhism. The Temple Ordinance of 1911 (Korean: 사찰령; Hanja: 寺刹令) changed the traditional system whereby temples were run as a collective enterprise by the Sangha, replacing this system with Japanese-style management practices in which temple abbots appointed by the Governor-General of Korea were given private ownership of temple property and given the rights of inheritance to such property. More importantly, monks from pro-Japanese factions began to adopt Japanese practices, by marrying and having children.

Today, the practice of monastic celibacy varies in Korean Buddhism. The two sects of Korean Seon divided in 1970 over this issue; the Jogye Order is fully celibate while the Taego Order has both celibate monastics and non-celibate Japanese-style priests.

== Monastic robes ==
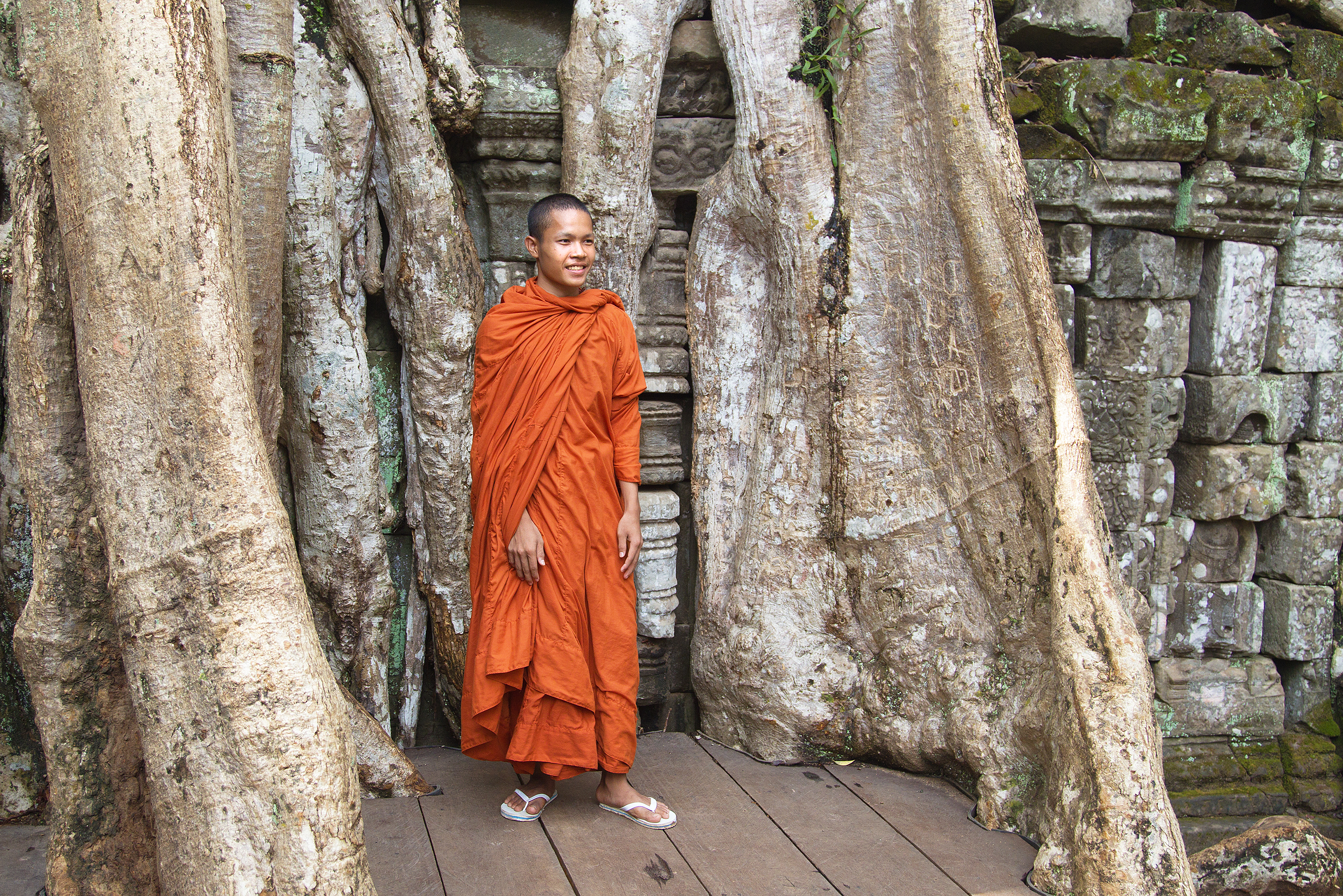
A Cambodian monk in his robes

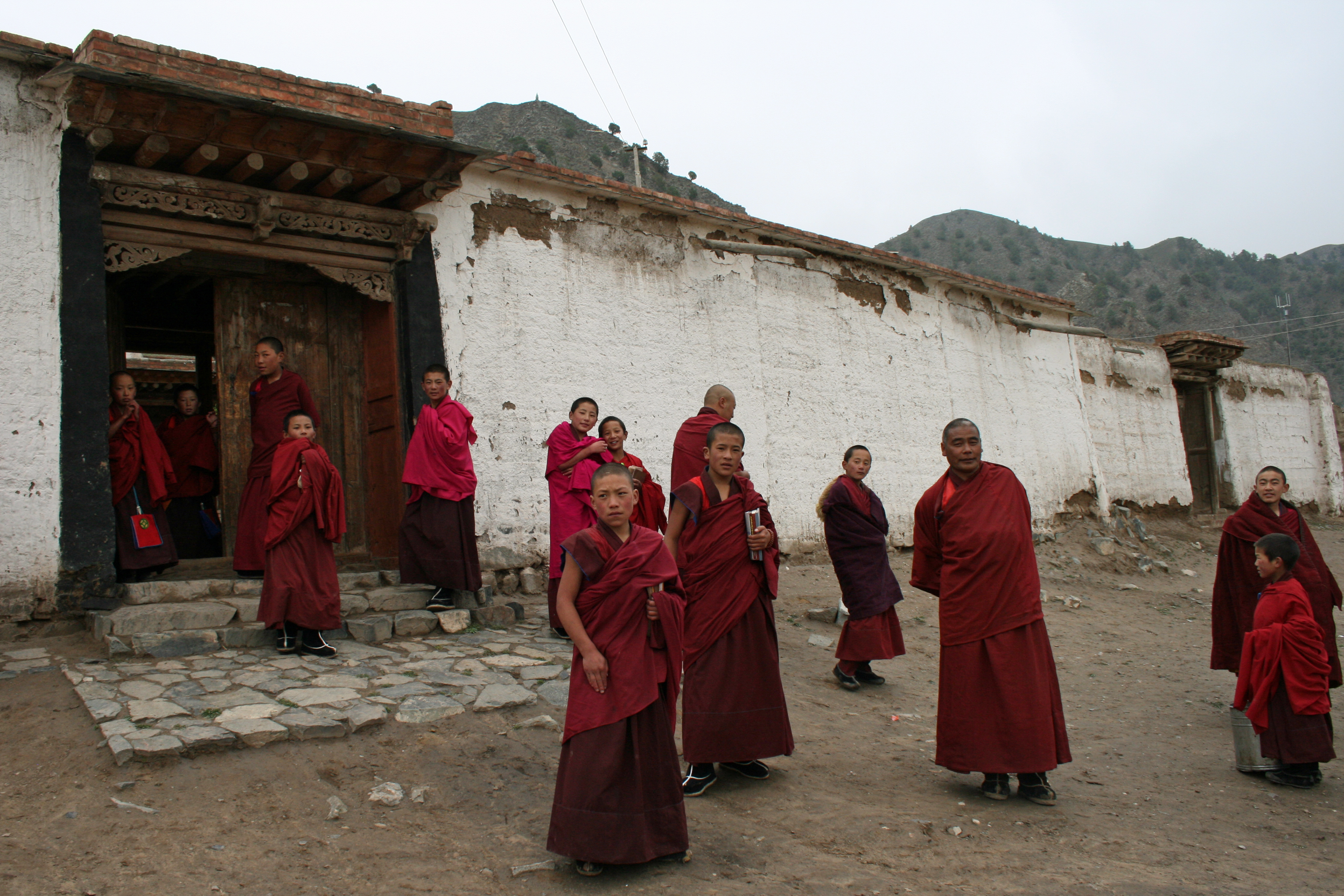
Tibetan monks gathered outside of Wutun Monastery wearing traditional robes

The special dress of ordained Buddhist monks is called kāṣāya in Sanskrit, referred to in English as robes. The idea of wearing a simple durable form of protection for the body from weather and climate is ancient and goes back to Indian sramana traditions. In each Buddhism tradition, there is some uniformity in the color and style of dress. Color is often chosen due to the wider availability of certain pigments in a given geographical region. In Tibet and the Himalayan regions (Kashmir, Nepal and Bhutan), red is the preferred pigment used in the dyeing of robes. In Myanmar, reddish brown; In India, Sri Lanka and South-East Asia, various shades of yellow, ochre and orange prevail. In China, Korea, Japan and Vietnam, yellow, gray or black is common. In some traditions, monks often make their own robes from cloth that is donated to them.

The robes of Tibetan novices and monks differ in various aspects, especially in the application of "holes" in the dress of monks. Some monks tear their robes into pieces and then mend these pieces together again. Upāsakas cannot wear the "chö-göö", a yellow tissue worn during teachings by both novices and full monks.

Theravada countries observe a rite called the Kathina Puja, in which a special Kathina robe is made in 24 hours from donations by lay supporters of a temple. The robe is donated to the temple or monastery and the resident monks then select from their own number a single monk to receive this special robe.

== Gallery ==
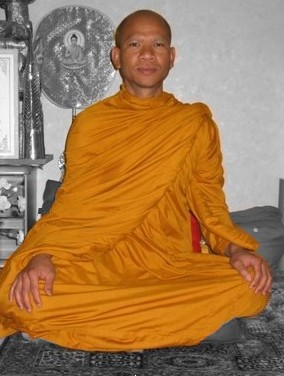
A Theravadin Buddhist monk in Laos

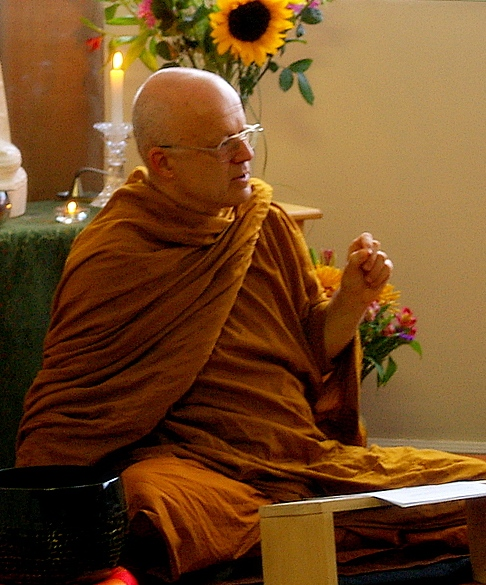
A Theravadin Buddhist monk in USA

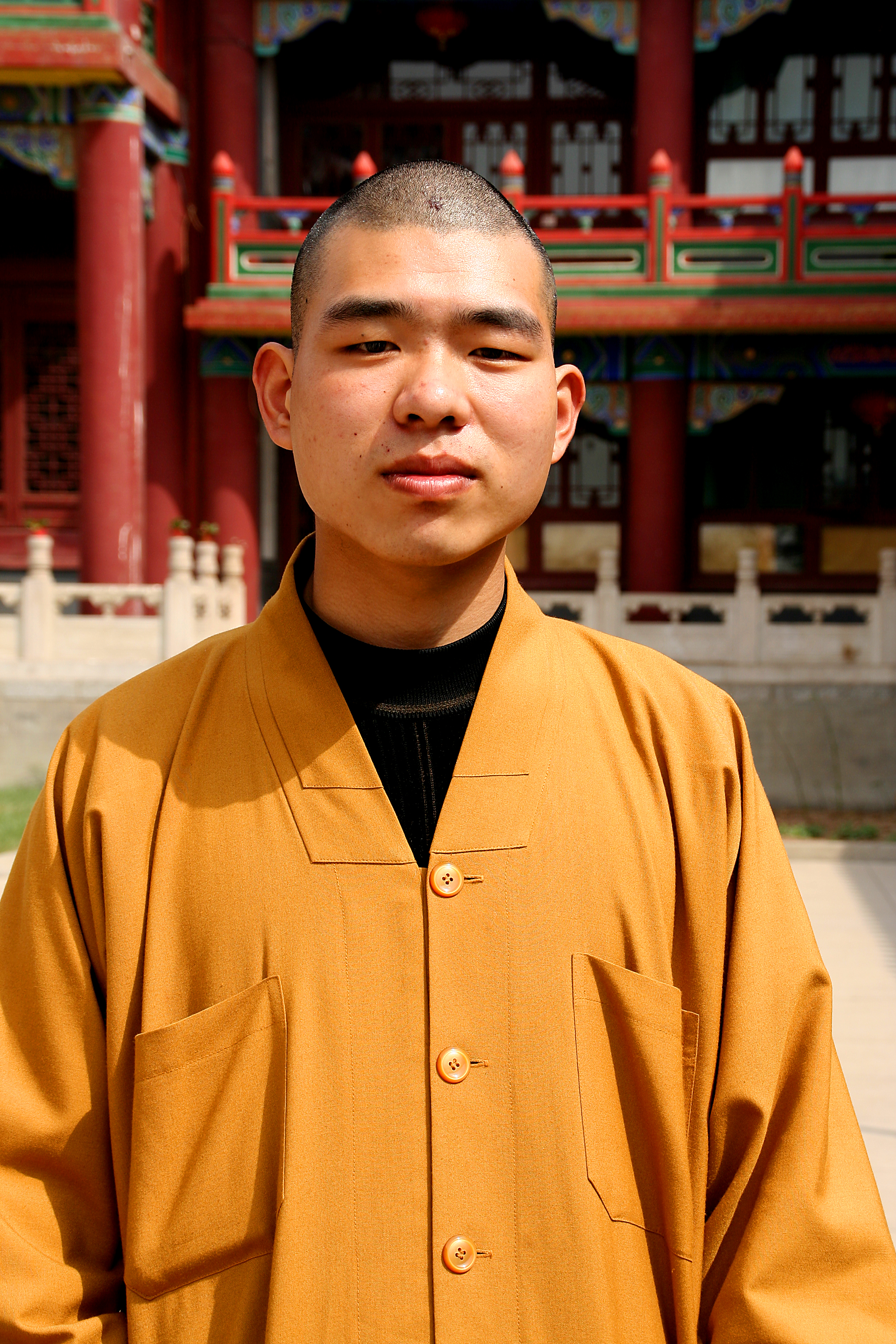
A Chinese Buddhist monk in mainland China

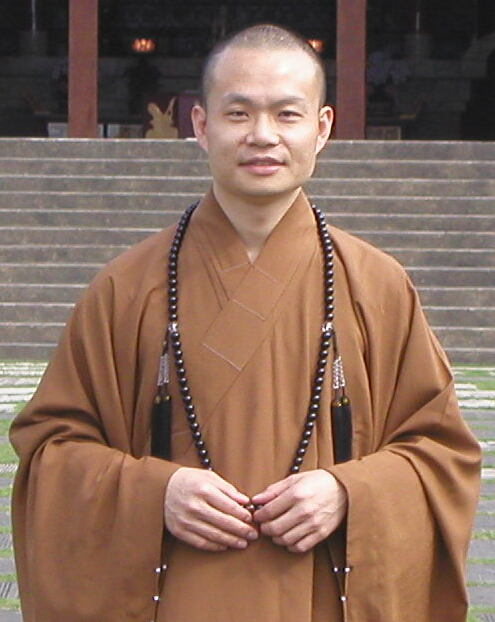
A Chinese Buddhist monk in Taiwan

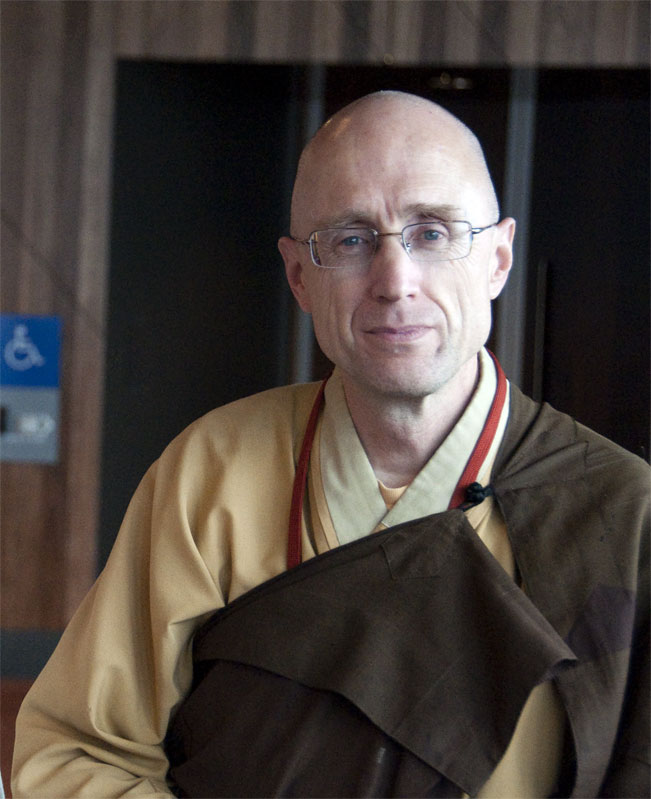
A Buddhist monk in the U.S. (Chinese Buddhism)

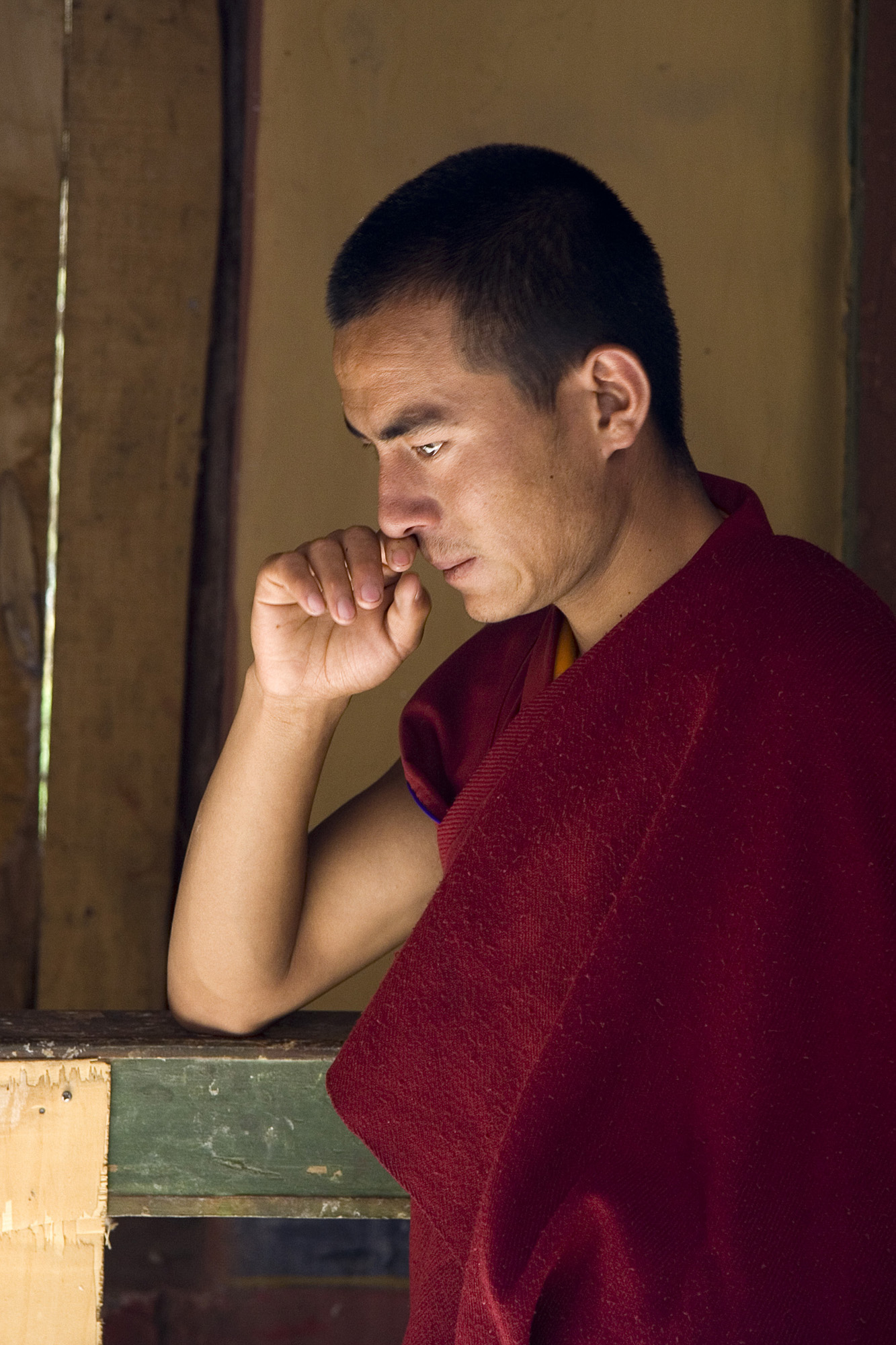
A Buddhist monk in Tibet

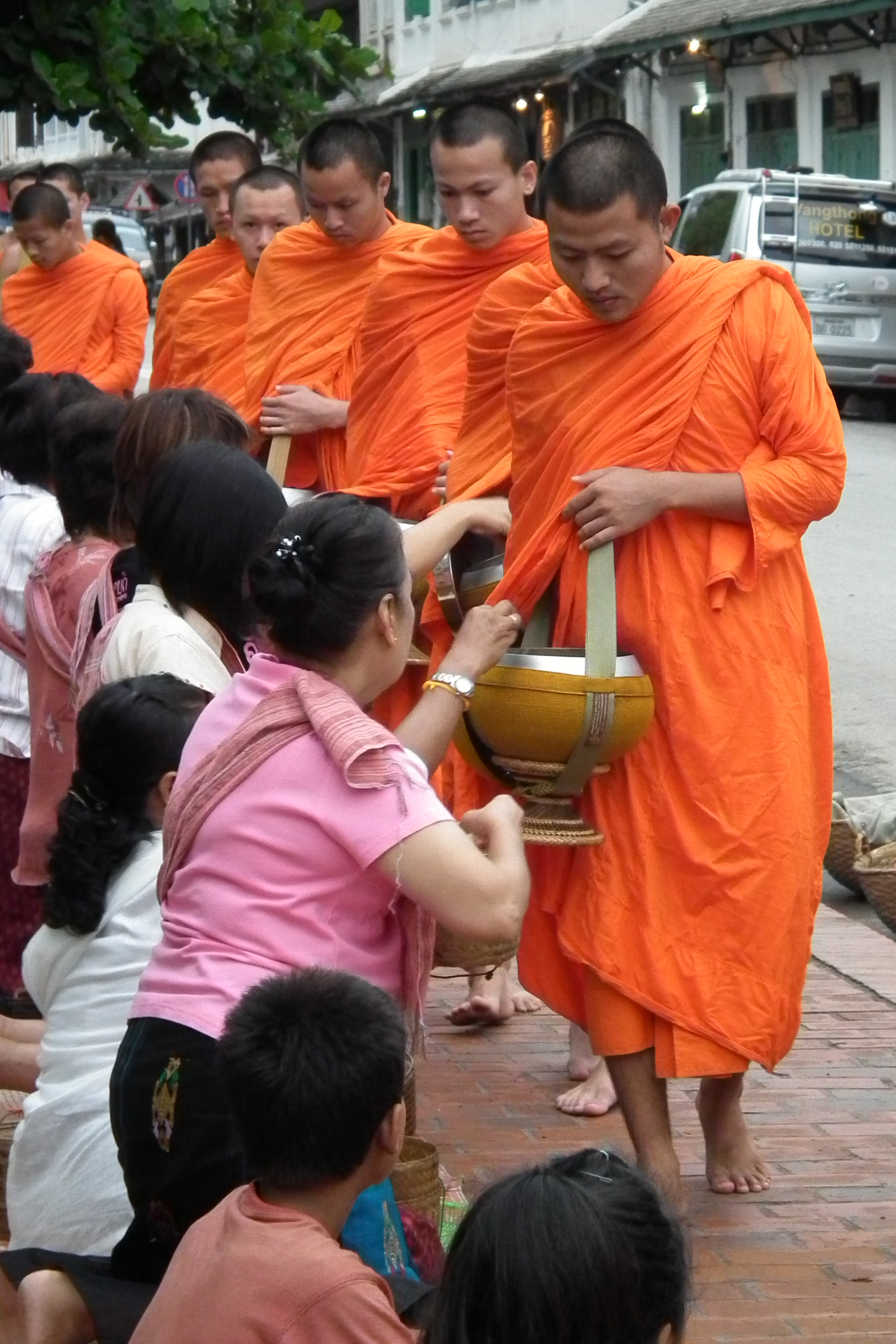
Monks in Luang Prabang, Laos

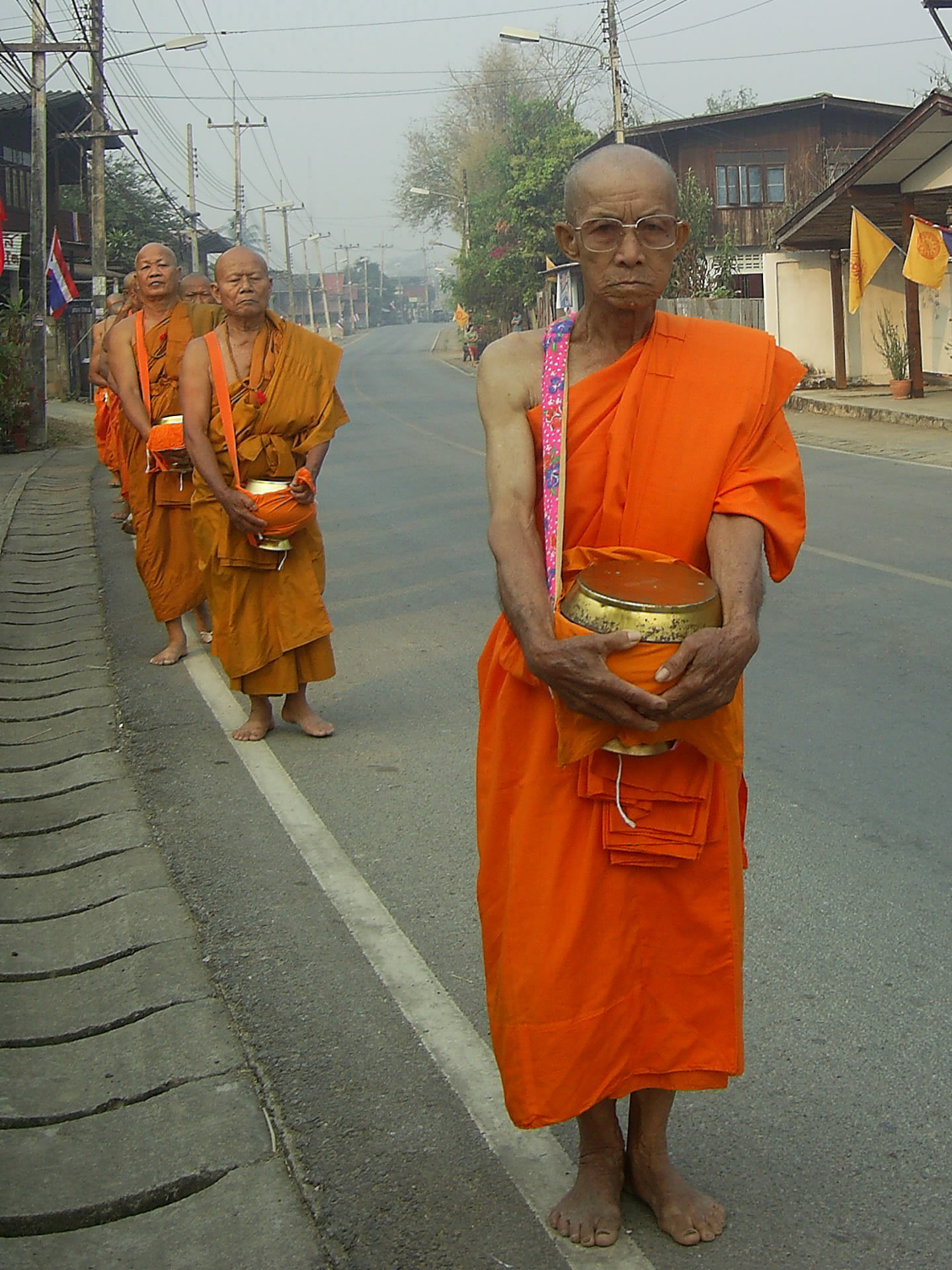
Monks in Thailand

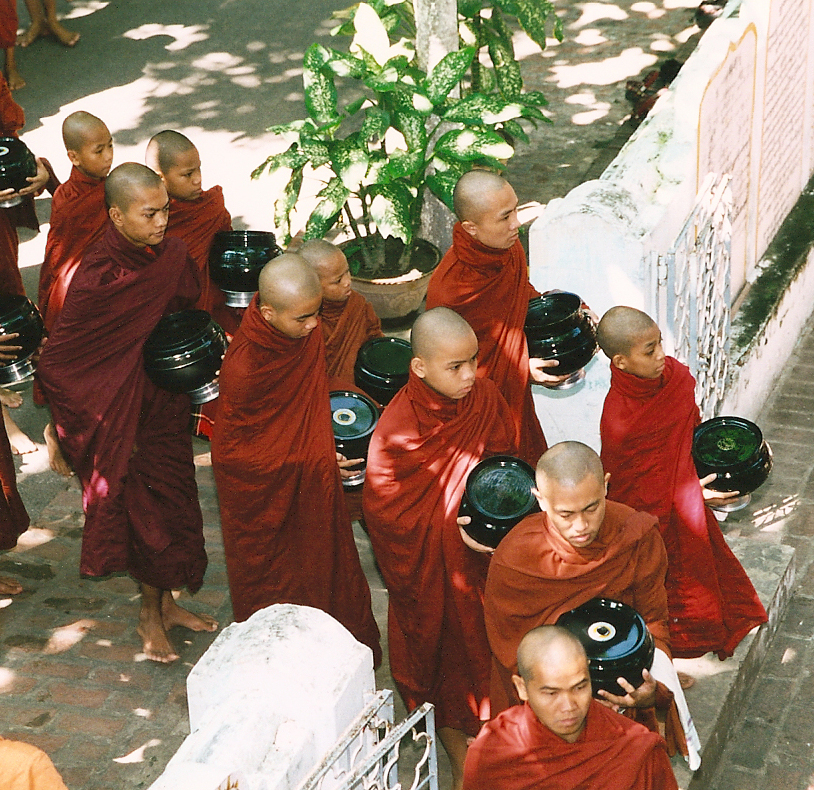
Monks in Myanmar

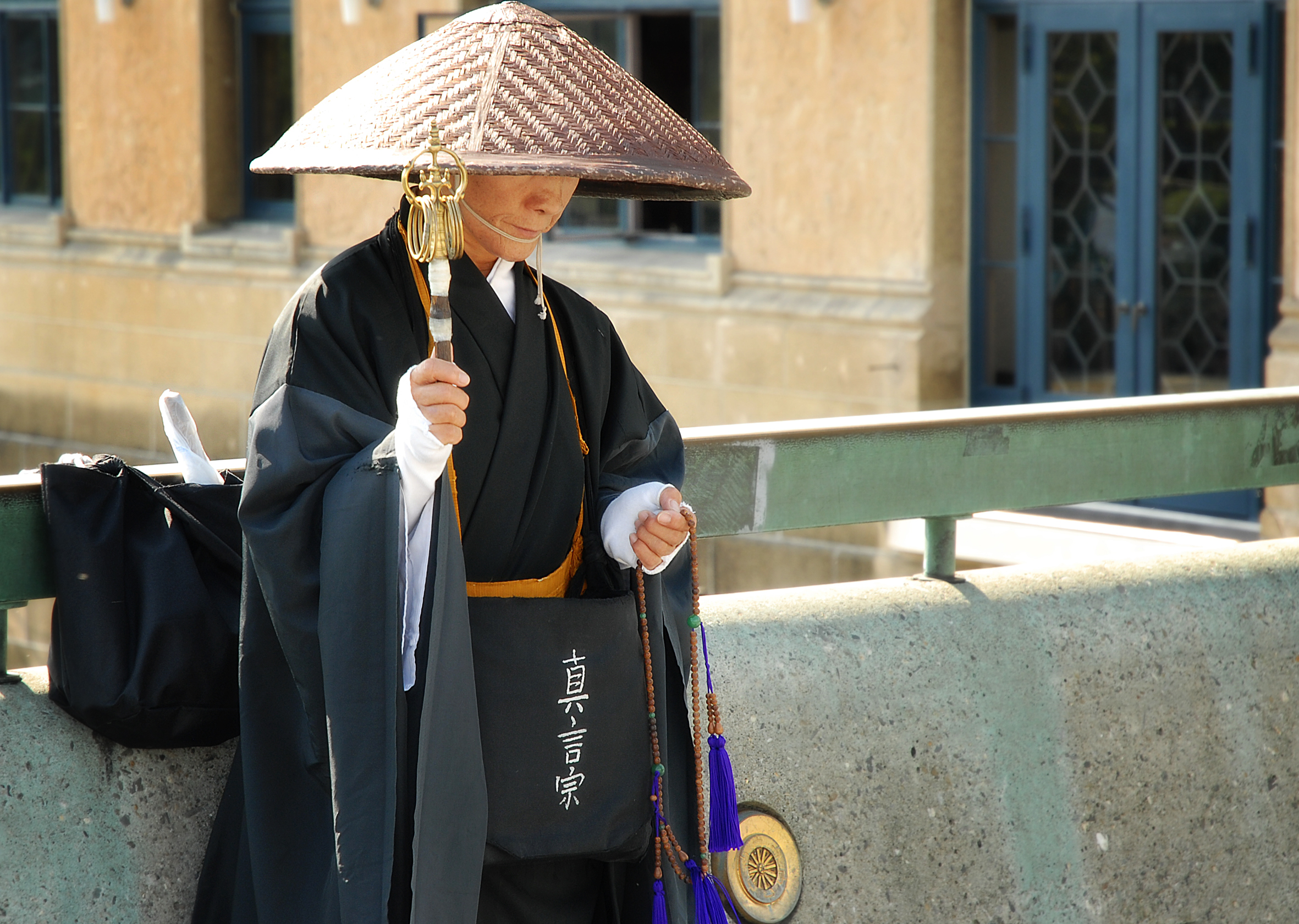
Monk in Kyoto, Japan

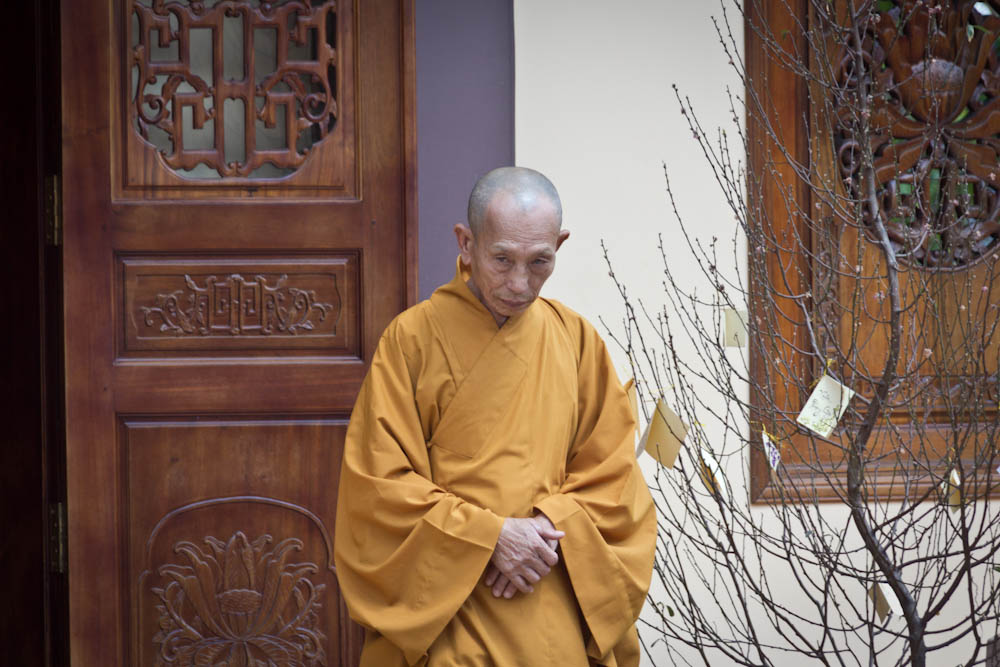
An old monk in Da Lat, Vietnam

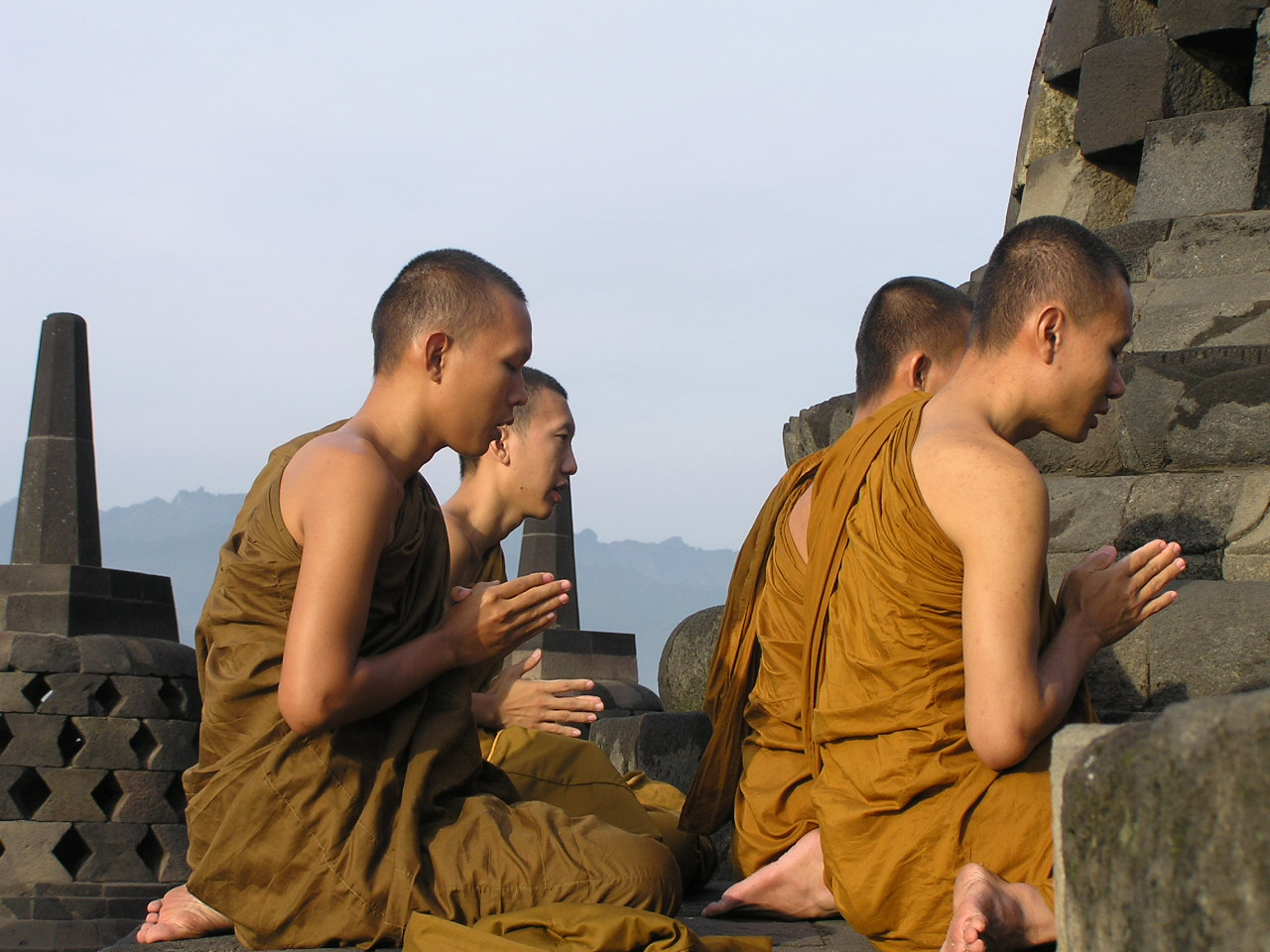
Monks chanting at Borobudur, Indonesia

== Historical terms in Western literature ==
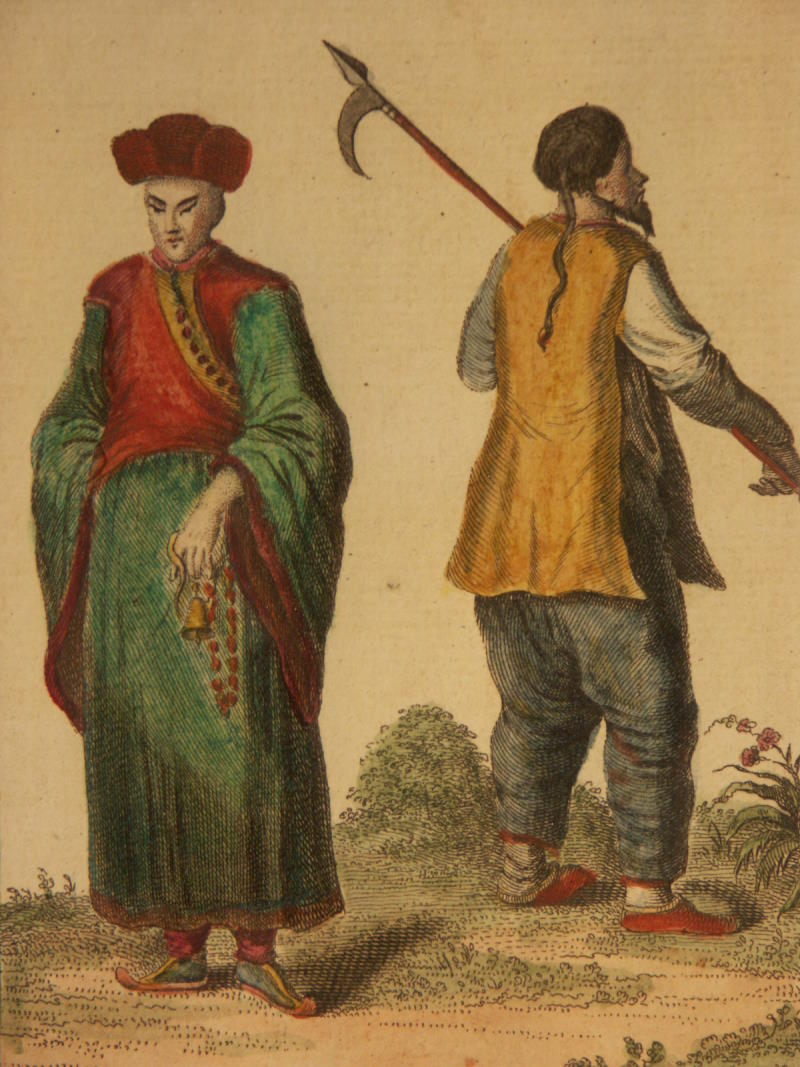
A "bonze" farmer from The Universal Traveller by Thomas Salmon, London, 1752

In English literature before the mid-20th century, Buddhist monks, particularly from East Asia and French Indochina, were often referred to by the term bonze. This term is derived from Portuguese and French from Japanese bonsō 'priest, monk'. It is rare in modern literature.

Buddhist monks were once called talapoy or talapoin from French talapoin, itself from Portuguese talapão, ultimately from Mon tala pōi 'our lord'.

The Talapoys cannot be engaged in any of the temporal concerns of life; they must not trade or do any kind of manual labour, for the sake of a reward; they are not allowed to insult the earth by digging it. Having no tie, which unites their interests with those of the people, they are ready, at all times, with spiritual arms, to enforce obedience to the will of the sovereign.

— Edmund Roberts, Embassy to the eastern courts of Cochin-China, Siam, and Muscat

The talapoin is a monkey named after Buddhist monks, much like the capuchin monkey is named after the Catholic Capuchin friars.

== See also ==
- Ajahn
- Anagarika
- Bhante
- Bhikkhuni
- Dharmabhāṇaka
- Sayadaw
- Samanera
- Oshō
- Unsui
