= Bodhisattva vow (disambiguation) =

Bodhisattva vow may refer to:

- The Bodhisattva vow taken by Mahayana Buddhists
- Bodhisattva Precepts#Brahma Net Sutra, the monastic vows used in some schools of Buddhism in Japan and Korea
- "Bodhisattva Vow", a track from the Beastie Boys' 1994 album Ill Communication.
