= Brahmajāla Sūtra =

Vinaya Sutra in Mahayana Buddhism

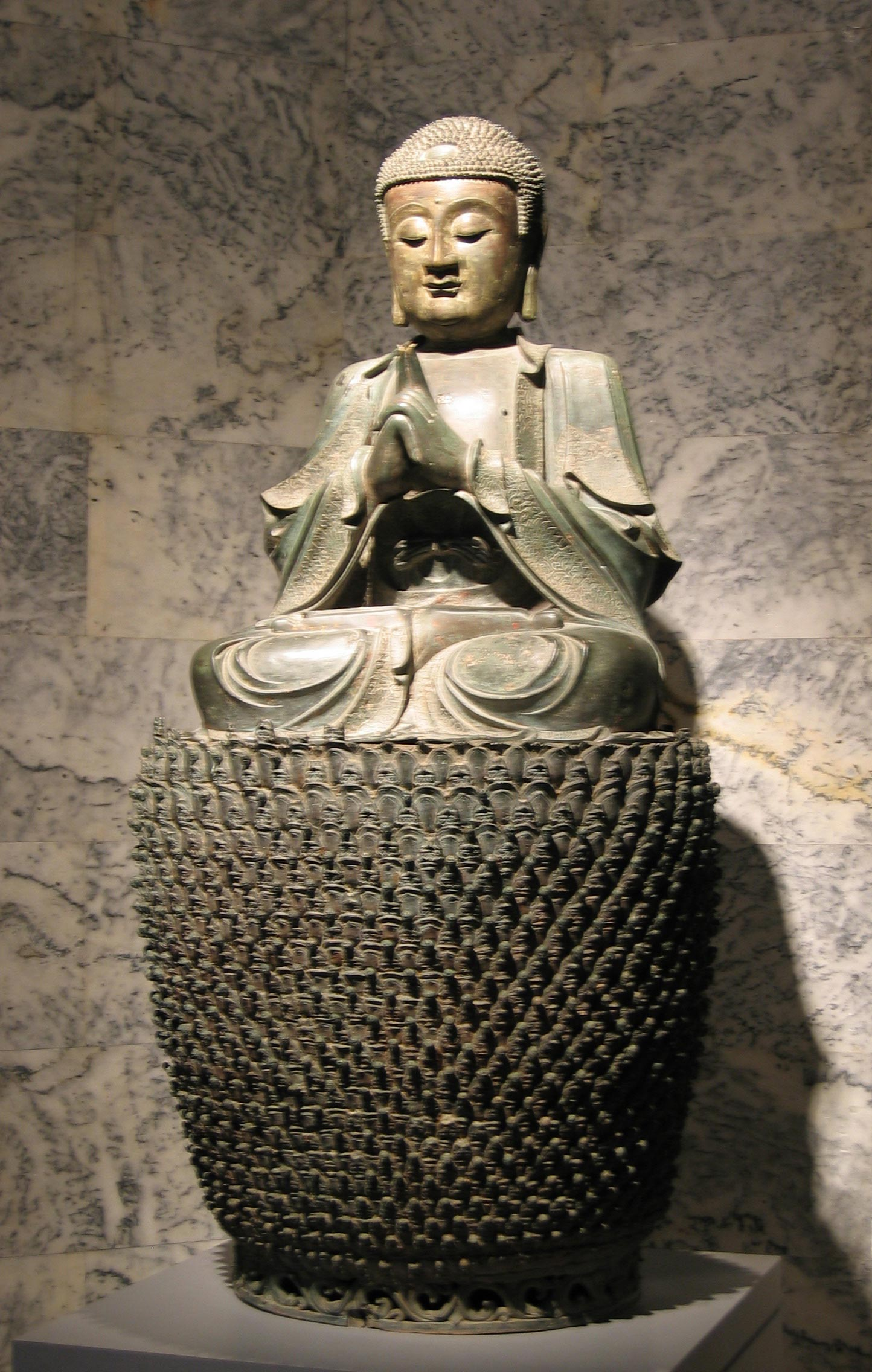
Vairocana as described in the Brahmajala Sutra. Chinese sculpture of the Ming Dynasty (1368–1644)

The Brahmajāla Sūtra (traditional Chinese: 梵網經; ; pinyin: Fànwǎng jīng; Japanese pronunciation: Bonmōkyō), also called the Brahma's Net Sutra, is a Mahayana Buddhist Vinaya Sutra. The Chinese translation can be found in the Taishō Tripiṭaka. The Tibetan translation can be found in Peking (Beijing) Kangyur 256. From the Tibetan it was also translated into Mongolian and the Manchu languages. It is known alternatively as the Brahmajāla Bodhisattva Śīla Sūtra (traditional Chinese: 梵網菩薩戒經; ; pinyin: Fàn Wǎng Púsà Jiè Jīng).

The Brahmajāla Sūtra is related to the important Huayan metaphor of Indra's net.

It is not related to the Brahmajala Sutta of the Pāli Canon of Theravada Buddhism.

== History ==
The sutra is traditionally regarded as having been recorded in Sanskrit and then translated into Chinese by Kumārajīva in 406. Several scholars assume that it was composed in East Asia by unknown authors in the mid-5th century, and is apocryphal. The sutra itself claims that it is part of a much longer Sanskrit text, but such a text has never been found. Qu Dacheng (pinyin transliteration) or Wut Tai Shing (Cantonese transliteration) suggests that because the contents of the longer Brahmajala Sutra very much resembled the Avataṃsaka Sutra that was already translated, the translators of the Brahmajala Sutra only translated the key differences. Some scholars and many Mahayana monastics believe the sutra is not apocryphal. Amoghavajra, one of the patriarchs of Chinese Esoteric Buddhism and Shingon Buddhism who was fluent in both Sanskrit and Chinese, stated that the Brahmajala Sutra is a part of the Vajrasekhara Sutra that was not translated into Chinese. Ven. Taixu on his study of the Brahmajala Sutra and the Mahayana Yoga of the Adamantine Sea Mañjuśrī Thousand Arms Thousand Bowls Great King of Tantra noted many similarities between the two and therefore the Brahmajala Sutra must have been translated from Sanskrit. Qu Dacheng states that the Brahmajala Sutra whilst not translated by Kumārajīva is unlikely to be apocryphal. Of special interest, Qu notes some of the Brahmajala Sutra's Ten Bodhisattva Bhūmi matches the Mahāvastu, an early Buddhist Hybrid Sanskrit Mahayana text never translated into Chinese.

== Content ==
This sutra introduces Vairocana and his relationship to Gautama Buddha. It also states ten major precepts for Bodhisattvas (Chinese: 十重戒) and the 48 minor precepts to follow to advance along the bodhisattva path.

The bodhisattva precepts of the Brahmajala Sutra came to be treated in China as a higher ethic a monastic would adopt after ordination in addition to the prātimokṣa vows. In Japan, the ten precepts came to displace monastic rules almost completely starting with Saichō and the rise of the Tendai.

The name of the sutra derives from the vast net that the god Brahma hangs in his palace and how each jewel in the net reflects the light of every other jewel:

At that time, he [Shakyamuni Buddha] contemplated the wonderful Jewel Net hung in Lord Brahma's palace and preached the Brahmajala Sutta for the Great Assembly. He said: "The innumerable worlds in the cosmos are like the eyes of the net. Each and every world is different, its variety infinite. So too are the Dharma Doors (methods of cultivation) taught by the Buddhas.

The sutra is also noteworthy for describing who Vairocana is as personification of the dharma or Dharmakāya:

Now, I, Vairocana Buddha, am sitting atop a lotus pedestal; on a thousand flowers surrounding me are a thousand Sakyamuni Buddhas. Each flower supports a hundred million worlds; in each world a Sakyamuni Buddha appears. All are seated beneath a Bodhi-tree, all simultaneously attain Buddhahood. All these innumerable Buddhas have Vairocana as their original body.

== Bodhisattva Precepts ==
The Brahmajala Sutra has a list of ten major and forty-eight minor rules known as the Bodhisattva Precepts. The Bodhisattva Precepts may be often called the "Brahma Net Precepts" (Chinese: 梵網戒; pinyin: Fànwǎng Jiè), particularly in Buddhist scholarship, although other sets of bodhisattva precepts may be found in other texts as well. Typically, in East Asian Mahayana traditions, only the 10 Major Precepts are considered the Bodhisattva Precepts. According to the sutra, the 10 Major Bodhisattva Precepts are in summary:

1. Not to kill or encourage others to kill.
2. Not to steal or encourage others to steal.
3. Not to engage in licentious acts or encourage others to do so. A monk is expected to abstain from sexual conduct entirely.
4. Not to use false words and speech, or encourage others to do so.
5. Not to trade or sell alcoholic beverages or encourage others to do so.
6. Not to broadcast the misdeeds or faults of the Buddhist assembly, nor encourage others to do so.
7. Not to praise oneself and speak ill of others, or encourage others to do so.
8. Not to be stingy, or encourage others to do so.
9. Not to harbor anger or encourage others to be angry.
10. Not to speak ill of the Buddha, the Dharma or the Sangha (lit. the Triple Jewel) or encourage others to do so.

Breaking any of these precepts is described as a parajika offence.
