= Pratimokṣa =

Collection of rules for Buddhist nuns and monks

The Pratimokṣa (Sanskrit: प्रातिमोक्ष, romanized: prātimokṣa) is a list of rules (contained within the vinaya) governing the behaviour of Buddhist monastics (monks or bhikṣus and nuns or bhikṣuṇīs). Prati means "towards" and mokṣa means "liberation" from cyclic existence (saṃsāra).

It became customary to recite these rules once a fortnight at a meeting of the sangha during which confession would traditionally take place. A number of prātimokṣa codes are extant, including those contained in the Theravāda, Mahāsāṃghika, Mahīśāsaka, Dharmaguptaka, Sarvāstivāda and Mūlasarvāstivāda vinayas. Pratimokṣa texts may also circulate in separate pratimokṣa sūtras, which are extracts from their respective vinayas.

== Overview ==
The Pratimokṣa belongs to the Vinaya of the Buddhist doctrine and is seen as the very basis of Buddhism. On the basis of the Prātimokṣa there exist in Mahayana Buddhism two additional set of vows: The Bodhisattva vows and the Vajrayana vows. If these two sets of vows are not broken, they are regarded as carrying over to future lives.

== Texts ==
The Pratimokṣa is traditionally a section of the Vinaya. The Theravada Vinaya is preserved in the Pāli Canon in the Vinaya Piṭaka. The Mūlasarvāstivāda Vinaya is preserved in both the Tibetan Buddhist canon in the Kangyur, in a Chinese edition, and in an incomplete Sanskrit manuscript. Some other complete Vinaya texts are preserved in the Chinese Buddhist canon (see: Taishō Tripiṭaka), and these include:

- Mahīśāsaka Vinaya (T. 1421)
- Mahāsāṃghika Vinaya (T. 1425)
- Dharmaguptaka Vinaya (T. 1428)
- Sarvāstivāda Vinaya (T. 1435)
- Mūlasarvāstivāda Vinaya (T. 1442)

== Pratimokṣa in Buddhist traditions ==
=== Indian Buddhism ===
The Dharmaguptaka sect are known to have rejected the authority of the Sarvāstivāda pratimokṣa rules on the grounds that the original teachings of the Buddha had been lost.

=== Theravada Buddhism ===
The Patimokkha is the Pali equivalent of Pratimokṣa (Sanskrit). It is being followed by the monks of the Theravada lineage (Thailand, Sri Lanka, Myanmar, Cambodia and Laos). It consists of 227 rules for fully ordained monks (bhikkhus) and 311 for nuns (bhikkhunis). The Patimokkha is contained in the Suttavibhanga, a division of the Vinaya Pitaka.

=== East Asian Buddhism ===
Buddhist traditions in East Asia typically follow the Dharmaguptaka Vinaya lineage of the pratimokṣa, and this is standard for the following Buddhist traditions:

- Chinese Buddhism
- Buddhism in Vietnam
- Korean Buddhism

Some traditions of Buddhism in Japan and Korea also carry out full monastic ordination, but most do not. Instead, these traditions have priests and monastics who take the Bodhisattva Precepts instead of the traditional pratimokṣa vows.

=== Tibetan Buddhism ===
The pratimokṣa of the Mulasarvastivada lineage followed in Tibetan Buddhism is taken for life unless one or more of the four root vows are broken. In Tibetan Buddhism, there are eight types of Pratimokṣa vows:

==== Vows for laity ====
- Fasting Vows (Upavasa, nyungne) — 8 vows
- Layperson's Vows (skt. Upāsaka and Upāsikā, genyen) — 5 vows

The lay pratimokṣa consists of five vows that are also known as the Five Śīlas:

1. To refrain from killing.
2. To refrain from stealing.
3. To refrain from sexual misconduct.
4. To refrain from false speech.
5. To refrain from using intoxicants.

One is not obliged to take all five vows. The commentaries describe seven types of lay followers:

1. Promising to keep just one vow.
2. Promising to keep certain vows.
3. Promising to keep most of them.
4. Promising to keep all five.
5. Keeping all five and also promising to keep the pure conduct of avoiding sexual contact.
6. Keeping all five, pure conduct, and wearing robes with the promise to behave like a monk or a nun.
7. Lay follower of mere refuge. This person is unable to keep the vows but he promises to go for refuge to the triple gem until death.

==== Vows for monastics ====
1. Novices' Vows (śrāmaṇera getsul; śrāmaṇerī, getsulma) — 36 vows
2. Full Nun's Vows (bhikṣuni, gelongma) — 364 vows
3. Full Monk's Vows (bhikṣu, gelong) — 253 vows

Only full monks and full nuns are seen as full members of the Buddhist monastic order. A group of four fully ordained monastics is seen as a sangha. The prātimokṣa tells also how to purify faults, how to solve conflicts, and deal with various situations which can happen in the sangha.

== See also ==
- Early Buddhist schools
- First Buddhist council
- Second Buddhist council
- Muzha (given name)

== Bibliography ==
=== Indian Buddhism ===
- Prebish, Charles S. (1996). Buddhist monastic discipline : the Sanskrit Prātimoksạ Sūtras of the Mahāsāmg̣hikas and Mūlasarvāstivādins. Delhi: Motilal Banarsidass. ISBN 81-208-1339-1.

=== Tibetan Buddhism ===
- Novice Vows: Lama Mipham's commentary to Nagarjunas "Stanzas for a Novice Monk" together with "Essence of the ocean of Vinaya" by Tsongkhapa ISBN 81-86470-15-8 (LTWA India)
- Full Monk Vows: "Advice from Buddha Sakyamuni" by HH the 14th Dalai Lama, ISBN 81-86470-07-7 (LTWA India)
- Complete Explanation of the Pratimokṣa, Bodhisattva and Vajrayana Vows: "Buddhist Ethics" (Treasury of Knowledge: Book Five), Jamgon Kongtrul Lodro Taye, ISBN 1-55939-191-X, Snow Lion Publications
- Monastic Rites by Geshe Jampa Thegchok, Wisdom Books, ISBN 0-86171-237-4
- Ngari Panchen: Perfect Conduct: Ascertaining the Three Vows, Wisdom Publication, ISBN 0-86171-083-5 (Commentary on the three sets of vows by Dudjom Rinpoche)
