= Bodhisattva Precepts =

Set of moral codes in Mahayana Buddhism

The Bodhisattva Precepts (Skt. bodhisattva-śīla or bodhisattva-saṃvāra, traditional Chinese: 菩薩戒; ; pinyin: Púsà Jiè, Japanese: 菩薩戒, romanized: bosatsukai; Wylie: byang chub sems dpa’i sdom pa) are a set of ethical trainings (śīla) used in Mahāyāna Buddhism to advance a practitioner along the path to becoming a bodhisattva. These sets of "restrains" (Sanskrit: saṃvāra) are the main ethical code in Mahāyāna Buddhism and as thus also sometimes called "Mahāyāna precepts" (Ch: 大乘戒).

Traditionally, Buddhist monks and nuns observed the basic moral code in Buddhism, the monastic prātimokṣa or five precepts for laypersons, but in the Mahāyāna tradition, Buddhist monastics and laypersons commonly observe the Bodhisattva Precepts as well. The Bodhisattva Precepts are associated with the bodhisattva vow to save all beings and with bodhicitta.

== Overview ==
Early Buddhism made use of basic moral codes called Prātimokṣa. They included sets of precepts which were expected to be taken by laypersons, like the five precepts, and longer sets of rules for monastics (the Vinaya). With the emergence of Mahāyāna traditions, alternative moral codes were established, found in texts such as the Bodhisattvabhūmi, Candragomin's Bodhisattvasamvaraviṃśaka, and the Brahmajāla Sūtra.

Unlike prātimokṣa precepts, bodhisattva precepts could be undertaken by both monastics and laypeople, regardless of gender. Furthermore, bodhisattva precepts were considered to be valid in this life and in all future lifetimes until Buddhahood, whereas other sets of precepts were considered to lapse at death. Formal ceremonies for conferring bodhisattva precepts, along with confession rituals modeled on uposadha practices, are detailed in various Mahāyāna texts. These rites and models influenced later forms of Buddhism in China and Tibet.

Bodhisattva precepts cover a wide range of behavior. Some focus on interpersonal relations, encouraging compassion and altruism, while others address broader responsibilities, such as the prohibition against destroying cities. Interestingly, the bodhisattva precepts sometimes supersede the prātimokṣa precepts; for example, certain secondary infractions suggest that actions typically deemed unethical—such as killing or lying—could be justified if they lead to greater benefit. Notably, rejecting Mahāyāna as the Buddha’s word (buddhavacana) is a significant infraction, reflecting historical debates over the authenticity of Mahāyāna sūtras.

=== The Three Collections of Pure Precepts ===
A common schema for Mahāyāna precepts is the three categories referred to as the "three sets of pure precepts" (trividhāni śīlāni, Chin. 三聚净戒 sanju jingjie, or śīlatrayam, "three types of morality"). This category is already found in an early form in the Avataṃsaka Sūtra. It is also found in the Commentary on the Ten Stages Sutra (Ch: Shidi jinglun 十地經論), attributed to Vasubandhu.

The most important source for the three kinds of precepts is the Bodhisattvabhūmi, which explains these as:

1. Restraining precepts (saṃvaraśīla): These are the foundational rules of discipline derived from the prātimokṣa, which aim to prevent unwholesome actions. They thus include the five precepts and, for monks, include the entire Vinaya.
2. Precepts for cultivating virtuous deeds (kuśaladharmasaṃgrāhakaśīla): These emphasize engaging in wholesome and beneficial actions. These include all good actions that aid in the bodhisattva path, including making offerings to the three jewels, meditating, giving, dedication of merit and so on.
3. Precepts for benefiting sentient beings (sattvārthakriyāśīla): These focus on actively aiding and supporting others. It includes taking care of the sick, protecting people from dangers such as animals or bandits, teaching people the Dharma, using skillful means, comforting people, giving to the poor, rejoicing in the Dharma, praising those who do good and critiquing those who do bad,

The first category aligns with the disciplinary rules of early Buddhism (Hīnayāna), while the second and third reflect distinctly Mahāyāna ethical principles.

Aside from these, the Bodhisattvabhūmi also includes another set of specific precepts for monastic bodhisattvas. The earliest translation of this text (in Chinese, Taisho no. 30) has four main precepts and forty-two minor ones. The four main precepts are:

1. not to praise oneself and disparage others;
2. not to be stingy with the Dharma or wealth;
3. not to be angry, resentful, and refuse to accept another’s apology;
4. not to slander the bodhisattva scriptures

=== East Asian Buddhism ===
East Asian Buddhism makes use of different sets of bodhisattva precepts found in various Mahayana sutras.

Two of the most common sets of precepts are:

- the Mahayana precepts found in the Brahmajāla Sūtra and the Sutra of the Diadem of the Primary Activities of the Bodhisattvas (Pusa yingluo benye jing). This is a set of ten major and forty eight minor precepts mostly taken by monastics.
- the Upāsakāśīla sūtra precepts, commonly taken by laypersons.

==== Brahmajāla Sūtra precepts ====
The Brahmajāla Sūtra, translated by Kumārajīva (c. 400 CE), has a list of ten major and forty-eight minor Bodhisattva precepts. The Bodhisattva Precepts may be often called the "Brahma Net Precepts" (Chinese: 梵網戒; pinyin: Fànwǎng Jiè), particularly in Buddhist scholarship, although other sets of bodhisattva precepts may be found in other texts as well. These precepts are often taken by monastics in East Asian Buddhism.

Typically, in East Asian Mahāyāna traditions, only the ten major precepts are considered the bodhisattva precepts. According to the sutra, the ten major bodhisattva precepts are in summary:

1. Not to kill or encourage others to kill.
2. Not to steal or encourage others to steal.
3. Not to engage in licentious acts or encourage others to do so. A monk is expected to abstain from sexual conduct entirely.
4. Not to use false words and speech, or encourage others to do so.
5. Not to trade or sell alcoholic beverages or encourage others to do so.
6. Not to broadcast the misdeeds or faults of the Buddhist assembly, nor encourage others to do so.
7. Not to praise oneself and speak ill of others, or encourage others to do so.
8. Not to be stingy, or encourage others to do so.
9. Not to harbor anger or encourage others to be angry.
10. Not to speak ill of the Buddha, the Dharma or the Sangha (the Triple Jewel) or encourage others to do so.

Breaking any of these precepts is described as a major offense in the sutra. A fuller description is as follows:

1. A disciple of the Buddha shall not himself kill, encourage others to kill, kill by expedient means, praise killing, rejoice at witnessing killing, or kill through incantation or deviant mantras. He must not create the causes, conditions, methods, or karma of killing, and shall not intentionally kill any living creature. As a Buddha's disciple, he ought to nurture a mind of compassion and filial piety, always devising expedient means to rescue and protect all beings. If instead, he fails to restrain himself and kills sentient beings without mercy, he commits a Parajika (major) offense.
2. A disciple of the Buddha must not himself steal or encourage others to steal, steal by expedient means, steal by means of incantation or deviant mantras. He should not create the causes, conditions, methods, or karma of stealing. No valuables or possessions, even those belonging to ghosts and spirits or thieves and robbers, be they as small as a needle or blade of grass, may be stolen. As a Buddha's disciple, he ought to have a mind of mercy, compassion, and filial piety -- always helping people earn merits and achieve happiness. If instead, he steals the possessions of others, he commits a Parajika offense.
3. A disciple of the Buddha must not engage in licentious acts or encourage others to do so. [As a monk] he should not have sexual relations with any female -- be she a human, animal, deity or spirit -- nor create the causes, conditions, methods, or karma of such misconduct. Indeed, he must not engage in improper sexual conduct with anyone. A Buddha's disciple ought to have a mind of filial piety -- rescuing all sentient beings and instructing them in the Dharma of purity and chastity. If instead, he lacks compassion and encourages others to engage in sexual relations promiscuously, including with animals and even their mothers, daughters, sisters, or other close relatives, he commits a Parajika offense.
4. A disciple of the Buddha must not himself use false words and speech, or encourage others to lie or lie by expedient means. He should not involve himself in the causes, conditions, methods, or karma of lying, saying that he has seen what he has not seen or vice versa, or lying implicitly through physical or mental means. As a Buddha's disciple, he ought to maintain Right Speech and Right Views always, and lead all others to maintain them as well. If instead, he causes wrong speech, wrong views or evil karma in others, he commits a Parajika offense.
5. A disciple of the Buddha must not trade in alcoholic beverages or encourage others to do so. He should not create the causes, conditions, methods, or karma of selling any intoxicant whatsoever, for intoxicants are the causes and conditions of all kinds of offenses. As a Buddha's disciple, he ought to help all sentient beings achieve clear wisdom. If instead, he causes them to have upside-down, topsy-turvy thinking, he commits a Parajika offense.
6. A disciple of the Buddha must not himself broadcast the misdeeds or infractions of Bodhisattva-clerics or Bodhisattva-laypersons, or of [ordinary] monks and nuns -- nor encourage others to do so. He must not create the causes, conditions, methods, or karma of discussing the offenses of the assembly. As a Buddha's disciple, whenever he hears evil persons, externalists or followers of the Two Vehicles speak of practices contrary to the Dharma or contrary to the precepts within the Buddhist community, he should instruct them with a compassionate mind and lead them to develop wholesome faith in the Mahayana. If instead, he discusses the faults and misdeeds that occur within the assembly, he commits a Parajika offense.
7. A disciple of the Buddha shall not praise himself and speak ill of others, or encourage others to do so. He must not create the causes, conditions, methods, or karma of praising himself and disparaging others. As a disciple of the Buddha, he should be willing to stand in for all sentient beings and endure humiliation and slander -- accepting blame and letting sentient beings have all the glory. If instead, he displays his own virtues and conceals the good points of others, thus causing them to suffer slander, he commits a Parajika offense.
8. A disciple of the Buddha must not be stingy or encourage others to be stingy. He should not create the causes, conditions, methods, or karma of stinginess. As a Bodhisattva, whenever a destitute person comes for help, he should give that person what he needs. If instead, out of anger and resentment, he denies all assistance -- refusing to help with even a penny, a needle, a blade of grass, even a single sentence or verse or a phrase of Dharma, but instead scolds and abuses that person -- he commits a Parajika offense.
9. A disciple of the Buddha shall not harbor anger or encourage others to be angry. He should not create the causes, conditions, methods, or karma of anger. As a disciple of the Buddha, he ought to be compassionate and filial, helping all sentient beings develop the good roots of non-contention. If instead, he insults and abuses sentient beings, or even transformation beings [such as deities and spirits], with harsh words, hitting them with his fists or feet, or attacking them with a knife or club -- or harbors grudges even when the victim confesses his mistakes and humbly seeks forgiveness in a soft, conciliatory voice -- the disciple commits a Parajika offense.
10. A Buddha's disciple shall not himself speak ill of the Triple Jewel or encourage others to do so. He must not create the causes, conditions, methods or karma of slander. If a disciple hears but a single word of slander against the Buddha from externalists or evil beings, he experiences a pain similar to that of three hundred spears piercing his heart. How then could he possibly slander the Triple Jewel himself? Hence, if a disciple lacks faith and filial piety towards the Triple Jewel, and even assists evil persons or those of aberrant views to slander the Triple Jewel, he commits a Parajika offense.

The forty eight minor precepts include refraining from numerous negative acts such as: eating meat, drinking alcohol, not respecting teachers, failing to make offerings or attending Dharma teachings, abandoning the Mahayana, keeping weapons, trading slaves, arson, promoting non-Mahayana teachings, divisive speech, wrong livelihood, selling weapons, persecuting Dharma followers, etc.

These bodhisattva precepts are particularly important in Japanese Buddhism, as many Japanese monastics do not follow the full Vinaya, but do follow a monastic code based on the bodhisattva precepts. Thus, Japanese schools like Tendai and Zen follow these precepts and their main ethical code. In the Sōtō school of Zen, the founder Dōgen also wrote on these precepts in his Busso shōden bosatsukai kyōju kaimon. However, he taught and transmitted only the ten major precepts of the Brahmā's Net Sūtra and not the forty eight minor ones. He combined these ten with the three refuges and the three pure precepts into what is today called the sixteen precepts.

==== Upāsakāśīla sūtra precepts ====
The Sutra of the Ethics of a Lay Follower (Upāsakāśīla sūtra, Chinese: Youposai wu jie weiyi jing 優婆塞五戒 威儀經, Taisho no. 1488) contains six major and twenty eight minor bodhisattva precepts specifically for Buddhist lay disciples (upāsakas). In Chinese Buddhism, this is often done in a ceremony at a Buddhist temple and sometimes a retreat lasting multiple days is required for orientation.

The six major lay bodhisattva precepts in this sutra are the five precepts plus an extra precept which focuses on not "speaking of the faults of bhiksus, bhiksunis, upasakas, or upasikas." Furthermore, the fifth precept (not taking any intoxicants like alcohol etc) has been modified to "not selling intoxicants". Minor precepts include things like making offerings to parents and teachers, looking after the sick, and greeting monastics and elder lay disciples.

=== Indo-Tibetan Buddhism ===
In Vajrayāna, the bodhisattva vows became the second of three sets of precepts, preceded by the prātimokṣa vows and followed by tantric commitments (samaya). Tibetan literature, particularly the Sdom gsum texts, extensively explores the interrelationship and compatibility of these three sets of vows.

In Tibetan Buddhism there are two lineages of bodhisattva precepts, one from Asanga's tradition and another from Shantideva. Asanga (circa 300 CE) delineated 18 major vows and forty-six minor vows in the "Bodhisattvabhumi" section of the Yogācārabhūmi Śāstra. According to Alexander Berzin, the bodhisattva vows transmitted by the 10th-century Indian master Atisha "derives from the Sutra of Akashagarbha (Nam-mkha'i snying-po mdo, Skt. Akashagarbhasutra), as cited in Śikṣāsamuccaya (“Training Anthology”, Tib. bSlabs-btus), compiled in India by Śāntideva in the 8th century" including 18 primary and 48 secondary downfalls.

These Bodhisattva vows are still used in all four major traditions of Tibetan Buddhism. The eighteen major vows (as actions to be abandoned) which are shared by both traditions are as follows:

1. Praising oneself or belittling others due to attachment to receiving material offerings, praise and respect.
2. Not giving material aid or (due to miserliness) not teaching the Dharma to those who are suffering and without a protector.
3. Not listening to others' apologies or striking others.
4. Abandoning the Mahayana by saying that Mahayana texts are not the words of Buddha or teaching what appears to be the Dharma but is not.
5. Taking things belonging to the Buddha, Dharma or Sangha.
6. Abandoning the holy Dharma by saying that texts which teach the three vehicles are not the Buddha's word.
7. With anger depriving ordained ones of their robes, beating and imprisoning them or causing them to lose their ordination even if they have impure morality, for example, by saying that being ordained is useless.
8. Committing any of the five extremely negative actions: (1) killing one's mother, (2) killing one's father, (3) killing an arhat, (4) intentionally drawing blood from a Buddha or (5) causing schism in the Sangha community by supporting and spreading sectarian views.
9. Holding distorted views (which are contrary to the teaching of Buddha, such as denying the existence of the Three Jewels or the law of cause and effect etc.)
10. Destroying towns, villages, cities or large areas by means such as fire, bombs, pollution or black magic.
11. Teaching emptiness to those whose minds are unprepared.
12. Causing those who have entered the Mahayana to turn away from working for the full enlightenment of Buddhahood and encouraging them to work merely for their own liberation from suffering.
13. Causing others to abandon their Prātimokṣa vows.
14. Belittling the Śrāvakayāna or Pratyekabuddhayāna (by holding and causing others to hold the view that these vehicles do not abandon attachment and other delusions).
15. Falsely stating that oneself has realised profound emptiness and that if others meditate as one has, they will realize emptiness and become as great and as highly realized as oneself.
16. Taking gifts from others who were encouraged to give you things originally intended as offerings to the Three Jewels. Not giving things to the Three Jewels that others have given you to give to them, or accepting property stolen from the Three Jewels.
17. Causing those engaged in calm-abiding meditation to give it up by giving their belongings to those who are merely reciting texts or making bad disciplinary rules which cause a spiritual community not to be harmonious.
18. Abandoning either of the two types of bodhicitta (aspiring and engaging).

According to Atiśa, the Prātimokṣa vows are the basis for the Bodhisattva vows. Without keeping one of the different sets of Prātimokṣa vows (in one of the existing Vinaya schools), there can be no Bodhisattva vow.

== Traditional uses ==
=== Chinese, Korean, and Vietnamese traditions ===
The Chinese Chan monk, Yin Shun, wrote of the Bodhisattva Precepts, "To cultivate bodhi mind means to accept the bodhisattva precepts and practice the ten good deeds."

In practice, the acceptance of and ordination of the Bodhisattva Precepts varies greatly depending on the school of Mahayana Buddhism. In East Asian Buddhism, a fully ordained monk or nun ordains under the traditional prātimokṣa precepts first according to the vinaya of the Dharmaguptaka. In the Chinese tradition, this is called the Four Part Vinaya (Chinese: 四分律; pinyin: Sìfēnlǜ). Then as a supplement, the same disciple would undertake the Bodhisattva Precepts as well.

Monks and nuns are not considered "ordained" by the Bodhisattva Precepts, but rather by the "Four Part Vinaya", while the Bodhisattva Precepts served to strengthen the Mahayana ideals. Similarly, the Bodhisattva Precepts are given to lay disciples to strengthen their devotion to Buddhism as well. Such disciples often take the basic Five Precepts and then the Bodhisattva precepts as a supplement.

=== Japanese traditions ===
In Buddhism in Japan, the "Four-Part Vinaya" was deemphasized with the rise of Saichō and the Tendai sect and a new monastic community was set up exclusively using the Brahmajala Sutra's Bodhisattva Precepts. All Vinaya ordinations at the time were given at Tōdai-ji in Nara and Saichō had wanted to both undermine the power of the Nara Buddhist community and to establish a "purely Mahayana lineage", and made a request to the Emperor to Later Buddhist sects, which was granted 7 days after his death in 822.

Later Buddhist sects in Japan, including the Sōtō school of Zen, Jōdo-shū and Shingon Buddhism, adopted a similar approach to their monastic communities and exclusive use of the Bodhisattva Precepts. By this time in Japan, the Vinaya lineage had all but died out and Japan's remote location made it difficult to reestablish though limited efforts by Jōkei and the Shingon Risshu revived it for a time. This was further enforced during the Meiji period, when the Nikujiku Saitai Law (肉食妻帯) of 1872 decriminalized clerical marriage and meat-eating.
