= Bodhisattva vow =

Vow taken by Mahayana Buddhists to liberate all sentient beings

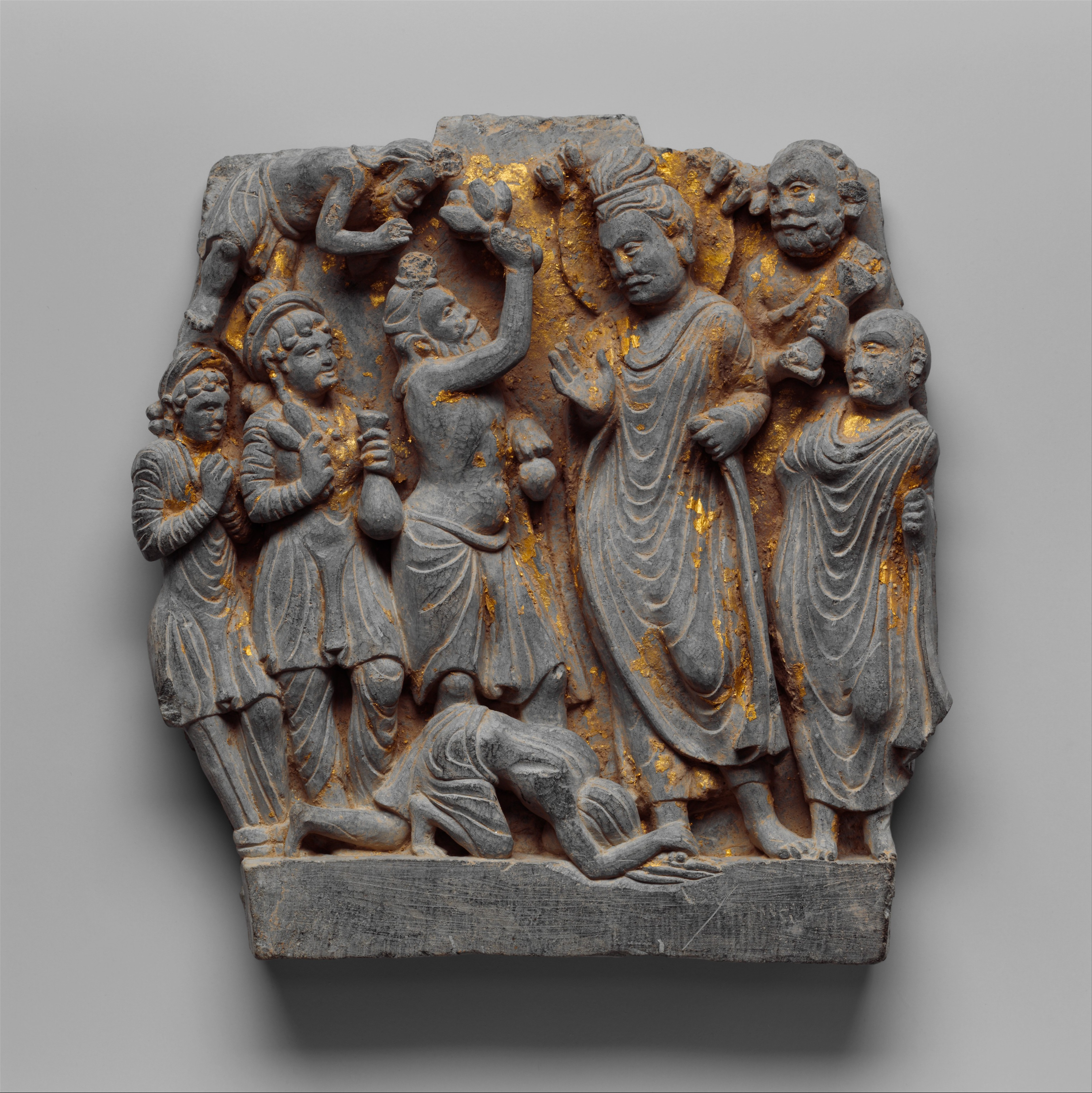
Gandharan relief depicting the ascetic Megha (Shakyamuni in a past life) prostrating before the past Buddha Dīpaṅkara, c. 2nd century CE (Gandhara, Swat Valley)

The Bodhisattva vow is a vow (Sanskrit: बोधिसत्त्व-प्रणिधानम्, bodhisattva-praṇidhāna, lit. bodhisattva aspiration or resolution; Chinese: 菩薩願, pusa yuan; J. bosatsugan) taken by some Mahāyāna Buddhists to achieve full buddhahood for the sake of all sentient beings. One who has taken the vow is nominally known as a bodhisattva (a being working towards buddhahood). This can be done by venerating all Buddhas and by cultivating supreme moral and spiritual perfection, to be placed in the service of others. In particular, bodhisattvas promise to practice the six perfections of giving, moral discipline, patience, effort, concentration and wisdom in order to fulfill their bodhicitta aim of attaining buddhahood for the sake of all beings.

The vow is commonly taken in a ritual setting, overseen by a senior monastic, teacher or guru. Whereas the prātimokṣa vows cease at death, the bodhisattva vow extends into future lives. The bodhisattva vows should not be confused with the Bodhisattva Precepts (Skt. bodhisattva-śīla), which are specific ethical guidelines for bodhisattvas.

== In the sources of the early schools ==
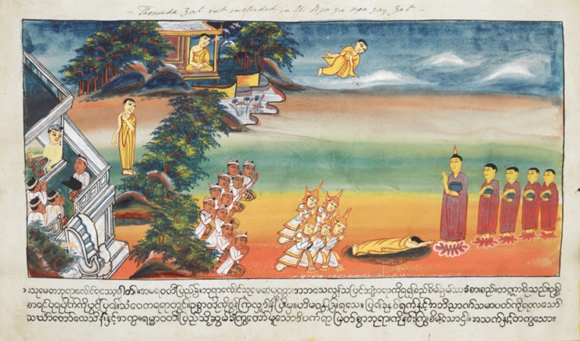
Illustrated Burmese manuscript depicting Sumedha (a past life of Shakyamuni) receiving a prediction from Dīpankara Buddha

The sources of the early Buddhist schools, like the Theravada Buddhavaṃsa and Nidanakatha (Prologue to the Jatakas), as well as the Mahasamghika Mahāvastu, contain stories of how in a previous life, Sakyamuni (then known as Sumedha) encountered the previous Buddha, Dīpankara, and made the vow to one day become a Buddha. Dīpankara confirmed that he would become a Buddha in the future. All early Buddhist schools held that making a vow in front of a living Buddha (and receiving a prediction), just like Sakyamuni had done, was the only way to become a bodhisattva. This view remains the orthodox understanding of bodhisattva vows in the Theravada tradition.

According to the Mahāvastu, Shakyamuni Buddha's first vow to become a Buddha was made under another past Buddha also called Shakyamuni. The vow is reported as follows:

When (the Bodhisattvas) have laid up an abundant store of merit, and have body and mind well developed they approach the beautiful Buddhas and turn their thoughts to enlightenment, (each vowing).

"By the merit I have formerly laid up in store, may I have insight into all things. May not my vow come to naught, but may what I vow come to pass.

"May my store of the root of merit be great enough for all living beings. Whatever evil deed has been done by me, may I alone reap its bitter fruit.

"So may I run my course through the world as He whose mind is rid of attachments does. May I set rolling the wheel of dharma that has not its equal, and is honoured and revered of devas and men."

The Mahāvastu depicts Shakyamuni taking other vows under other past Buddhas. When he meets the past Buddha Samitāvin, the text also contains another vow which is similar to the "fourfold vow" found in Mahayana sources:

May I in some future time become a Tathāgata, an Arhan, a perfect Buddha, proficient in knowledge and conduct, a Sugata, an unsurpassed knower of the world, a driver of tameable men, and a teacher of devas and men, as this exalted Samitāvin now is. May I become endowed with the thirty-two marks of a Great Man, and my body adorned with his eighty minor characteristics. May I have the eighteen distinctive attributes of Buddhahood, and be strong with the ten powers of a Tathāgata, and confident with the four grounds of self-confidence, as this exalted perfect Buddha Samitāvin now is. Having crossed over, may I lead others across; comforted, may I comfort others; emancipated, may I emancipate others. May I become so for the benefit and welfare of mankind, out of compassion for the world, for the good of the multitude, for the welfare and benefit of devas and men.

The Theravada Nidanakatha has the following verses attributed to Sumedha (the past life of the Buddha) when he made his vow to become a Buddha under the past Buddha Dipankara:

As I lay upon the ground this was the thought of my heart, if I wished it I might this day destroy within me all human passions.

But why should I in disguise arrive at the knowledge of the Truth? I will attain omniscience and become a Buddha, and (save) men and devas.

Why should I cross the ocean resolute but alone? I will attain omniscience, and enable men and devas to cross.

By this resolution of mine, I a man of resolution, will attain omniscience, and save men and devas, cutting off the stream of transmigration, annihilating the three forms of existence, embarking in the ship of the Truth, I will carry across with me men and devas.

== In Mahāyāna sutras ==
In the Mahayana Lalitavistarasutra, the bodhisattva Siddhartha (before becoming Sakyamuni Buddha) is said to have taken the following vow:

I will attain the immortal, undecaying, pain-free Bodhi, and free the world from all pain.

The Sanskrit Aṣṭasāhasrikā Prajñāpāramitā sutra states that a bodhisattva should train themselves with the following thought:

ātmānaṃ ca tathatāyāṃ sthāpayiṣyāmi sarvalokānugrahāya, sarvasattvān api tathatāyāṃ sthāpayiṣyāmi, aprameyaṃ sattvadhātuṃ parinirvāpayiṣyāmīti

My own self I will place in Suchness, and, so that all the world might be helped, I will place all beings into Suchness, and I will lead to Nirvana the whole immeasurable world of beings.

The sutra further states that "with that intention should a Bodhisattva undertake all the exercises which bring about all the wholesome roots. But he should not boast about them." Another passage also states:

Because in my presence, face to face with me, they have uttered the vow: "We, coursing in the practices of a Bodhisattva, shall set going on their way to full enlightenment many hundreds of living beings, yea, many niyutas of kotis of living beings. We shall hold up perfect enlightenment to them, instigate, encourage and excite them to win it, help it to come forth, help them to get established in it, help them to become irreversible."

In later Indian Mahāyāna Buddhism (and in modern Mahayana as well), one can become a bodhisattva by taking the vow and giving rise to bodhicitta in a ceremonial setting. Indian Mahāyāna Buddhists often accomplished this through a ritual called the "seven part worship" (saptāṇgapūjā or saptavidhā anuttarapūjā), which consists of: vandana (obeisance), worship, refuge, confession, rejoicing, prayers and requesting the buddhas to remain in the world.

=== Fourfold vows ===
Fourfold bodhisattva vows (that is, a set of vows with four main components), are found in numerous Mahāyāna sutras. According to Jan Nattier, there is a set of four bodhisattva vows that appears in various sutras including the Ugraparipṛcchā Sūtra, the Lotus Sūtra (in the Dharmaraksa and Kumarajiva translations), the Aṣṭasāhasrikā Prajñāpāramitā (in the Chinese translation by Lokaksema and Chih Ch'ien), the Avadānaśataka and the Compassionate Lotus sutra. Nattier translates this fourfold vow as follows:

The unrescued I will rescue

The unliberated I will liberate

The uncomforted I will comfort

Those who have not yet reached paranirvana, I will cause to attain paranirvana

Nattier also notes that a similar set of four vows (with small differences in wording) appears in the Dipankara Jataka, the Mahavastu, the Aṣṭasāhasrikā Prajñāpāramitā (in the Chinese translation by Kumarajiva), the Pañcaviṃśatisāhasrikā Prajñāpāramitā and in some Lotus Sutra translations. Nattier translates this other fourfold vow as follows:

vayaṃ tīrṇāḥ sattvāṃs tārayema, muktā mocayema, āśvastā āśvāsayema, parinirvṛtāḥ parinirvāpayema

Having crossed over [ourselves], may we cause [all] beings to cross over. Liberated, may we liberate [them]. Comforted, may we comfort [them]. Having attained parinirvana, may we cause [them] to attain parinirvana.

Nattier further notes that "it is quite possible to identify clear antecedents of these vows in pre-Mahayana literature" and thus it is likely that these fourfold vows evolved from earlier passages (found in the Digha Nikaya and the Majjhima Nikaya as well as the Chinese Agamas) that describe the activity of the Buddha. One such passage states:

Awakened, the Blessed One teaches the Dhamma for the sake of awakening.

Disciplined, the Blessed One teaches the Dhamma for the sake of disciplining.

Calmed, the Blessed One teaches the Dhamma for the sake of calming.

Having crossed over, the Blessed One teaches the Dhamma for the sake of crossing over.

=== Vows from the Avataṃsaka Sūtra ===
The Avataṃsaka Sūtra, a large composite text, contains various passages discussing the practices and vows that bodhisattvas undertake. One example can be found in book 18 of the text, which contains the following ten vows:

Enlightening beings have ten pure vows: (1) they vow to develop living beings to maturity, without wearying; (2) they vow to fully practice all virtues and purify all worlds; (3) they vow to serve the Enlightened, always engendering honor and respect; (4) they vow to keep and protect the true teaching, not begrudging their lives; (5) they vow to observe with wisdom and enter the lands of the Buddhas; (6) they vow to be of the same essence as all enlightening beings; (7) they vow to enter the door of realization of thusness and comprehend all things; (8) they vow that those who see them will develop faith and all be benefited; (9) they vow to stay in the world forever by spiritual power; (10) they vow to fulfill the practice of Universal Good, and master the knowledge of all particulars and all ways of liberation. These are the ten pure vows of enlightening beings.

==== Ten vows of Samantabhadra ====
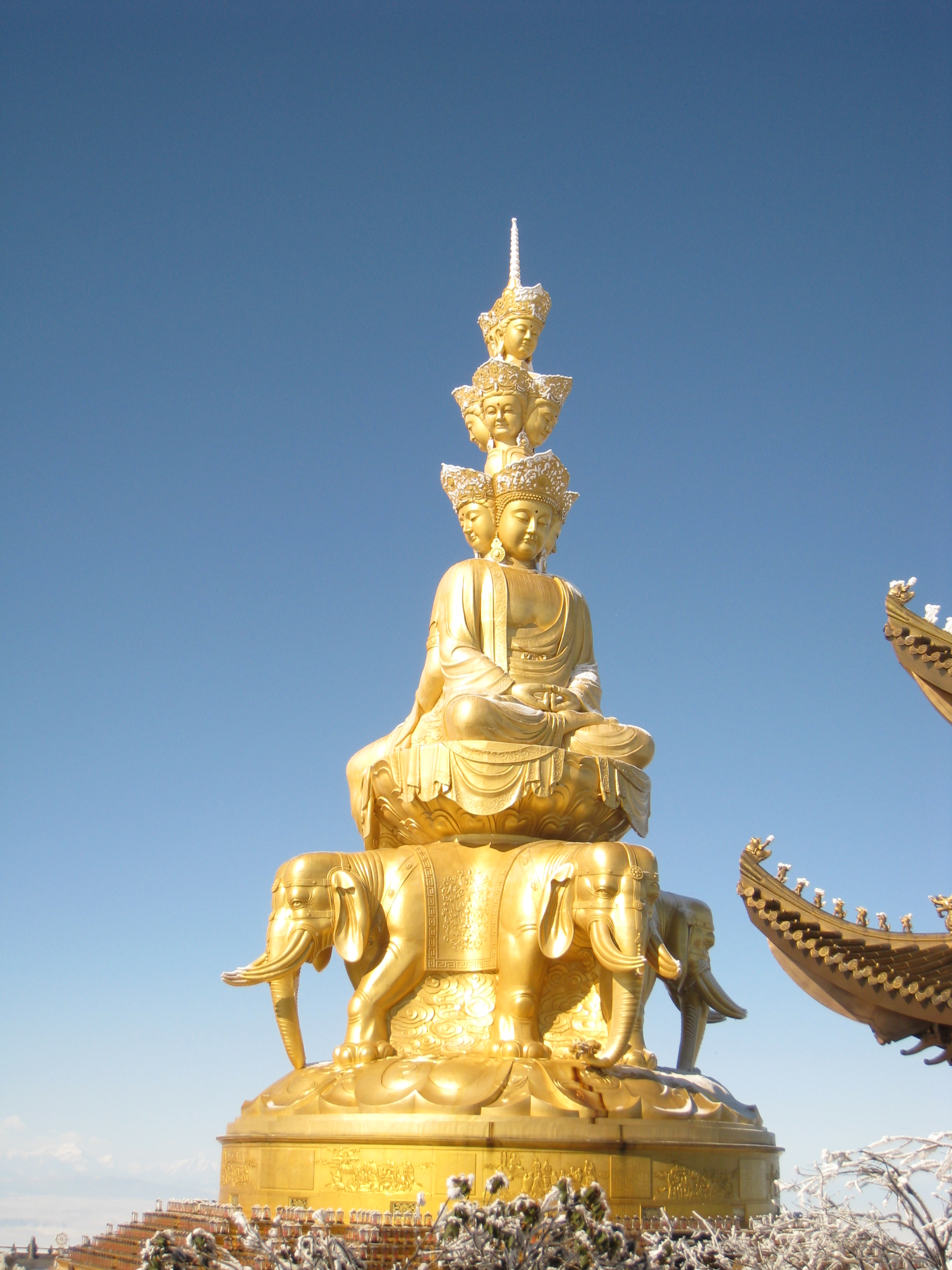
Statue of Bodhisattva Samantabhadra, Mount Emei, China

In the Avataṃsaka Sūtra, Samantabhadra makes ten vows which are an important source for East Asian Buddhism. Samantabhadra's vows also appear in the Samantabhadra-caryā-praṇidhānam, which is often appended to the end of the Avataṃsaka but originally circulated as an independent text.

Reciting these ten vows is also promoted by Shantideva in his Śikṣāsamuccaya.

The ten vows of Samantabhadra are:

1. The vow to pay homage to all the buddhas
2. To praise the virtues of the buddhas
3. To serve and make offerings to the buddhas
4. To confess past misdeeds and uphold the precepts
5. To rejoice in the merit and virtues of buddhas, bodhisattvas and all sentient beings
6. To ask the buddhas to preach the Dharma
7. To ask the buddhas to refrain from entering nirvana
8. To always follow the buddhas' teachings
9. To serve/benefit all sentient beings
10. To transfer the merit from all practices to the liberation of all beings

=== The three great vows from the Śrīmālā Sūtra ===
The Śrīmālādevī Siṃhanāda Sūtra contains a set of three vows. According to the Buddha in this sutra, "just as all forms are contained in space, so likewise the bodhisattva vows, which are as numerous as the sands of the Ganges River, are all contained in these three great vows". The three vows are:

1. By the power of my earnest aspiration, may I bring peace to innumerable and unlimited living beings. By my virtuous deeds, throughout all rebirths may I attain the wisdom of the True Dharma.
2. Having attained the wisdom of the True Dharma, for the sake of all living beings, may I explain it without wearying.
3. In accepting the True Dharma, may I abandon body, life, and wealth and uphold the True Dharma.

== In East Asian Buddhism ==
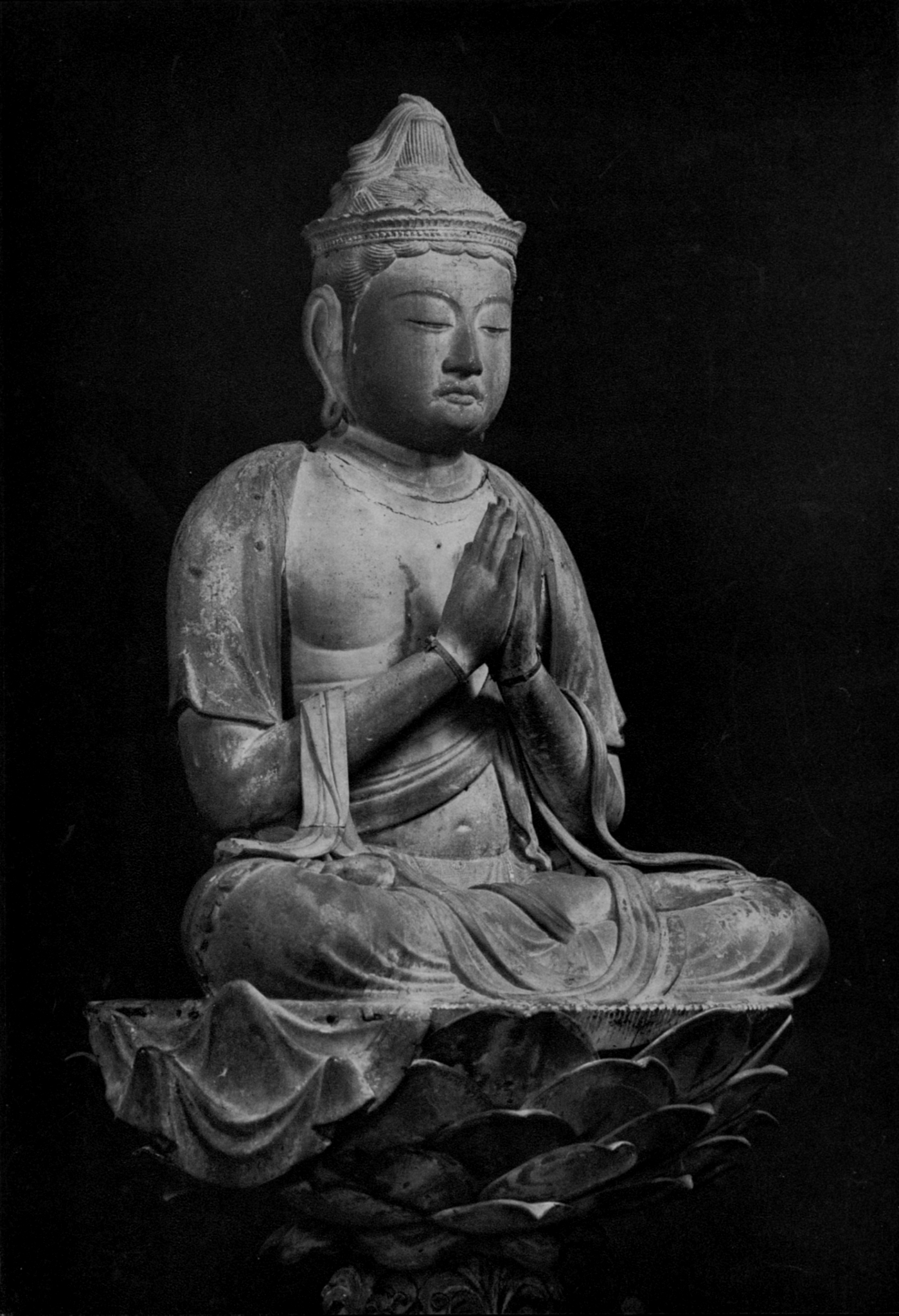
Samantabhadra Bodhisattva is associated with vows in East Asian Buddhism

=== Four extensive vows ===
In East Asian Buddhism, the most common bodhisattva vows are a series of "four extensive vows" outlined by the Tiantai Patriarch Zhiyi. According to Robert F. Rhodes, Zhiyi presents two versions of the four vows. The first one is taken from the Chinese version of the Lotus Sūtra and states:

- Those who have not yet been ferried over, I will ferry over.
- Those who have not yet understood, I will cause them to understand.
- Those who have not settled themselves, I will cause them to be settled.
- Those who have not attained nirvana, I will cause them to attain nirvana.

The second set of vows is original to Zhiyi's corpus and states:

- Sentient beings, limitless in number, I vow to ferry over.
- Passions (klesa) which are numberless, I vow to extinguish.
- The Dharma-gates without end (in number), I vow to know.
- The supreme Buddha Way, I vow to actualize.

Zhiyi explains that these vows correspond to the Four Noble Truths and that these vows arise with the four truths as their basis.

The following table presents the fourfold bodhisattva vow in various languages:

Chinese (hanzi)	Chinese (pinyin)	Sino-Japanese	Hangul	Korean	Vietnamese	English
四弘誓願	Sì hóng shì yuàn	Shi gu sei gan	사홍서원	sa hong seo won	Tứ hoằng thệ nguyện	The Four Encompassing Vows
眾生無邊誓願度	Zhòng shēng wúbiān shì yuàn dù	Shu jō mu hen sei gan do	중생무변서원도	Jung saeng mu byeon seo won do	Chúng sanh vô biên thệ nguyện độ	Masses [of] creatures, without-bounds, [I/we] vow to save [them all].
煩惱無盡誓願斷	Fánnǎo wújìn shì yuàn duàn	Bon nō mu jin sei gan dan	번뇌무진서원단	Beon noe mu jin seo won dan	Phiền não vô tận thệ nguyện đoạn	Anxiety [and] hate, [delusive-desires] inexhaustible, [I/we] vow to break [them all].
法門無量誓願學	Fǎ mén wúliàng shì yuàn xué	Hō mon mu ryō sei gan gaku	법문무량서원학	Beob mun mu jin seo won hag	Pháp môn vô lượng thệ nguyện học	Dharma gates beyond-measure [I/we] vow to learn [them all].
佛道無上誓願成	Fó dào wúshàng shì yuàn chéng	Butsu dō mu jō sei gan jō	불도무상서원성	Bul do mu sang seo won seong	Phật đạo vô thượng thệ nguyện thành	Buddha Way, unsurpassable, [I/we] vow to accomplish [it]

=== Shingon's Five Vows ===
Shingon Buddhism edits and expands the four vows into five vows (go sei) which are seen as the vows of Mahavairocana which include all bodhisattva vows. These five vows are the following:

1. Beings are innumerable; I vow to save them all (shu-jo-mu-hen-sei-guan-do).
2. Meritorious wisdoms are innumerable; I vow to accumulate them all (fuku chi mu hen sei gwan shu).
3. The Dharma teachings are innumerable; I vow to master them all (ho mon mu hen sei gwan gaku).
4. The Tathagata vows are innumerable; I vow to accomplish them all (nyorai mu hen sei gwan ji ji).
5. Awakening is unsurpassed; I vow to attain awakening (bodai mu jo sei gwan sho bodai).

== Pure Land Vows ==
Vows occupy a pivotal role Pure Land Buddhist theory and practice. Central to this tradition is the story of Amitābha Buddha, whose past vow (本願, pūrvapraṇidhāna) laid the foundation for the establishment of his Pure Land of Sukhavati, a pure buddhafield. These vows provides the theoretical foundation for the Pure Land Buddhist soteriology and serves as a practical guide for adherents aspiring to be born into the Pure Land, where one can easily and rapidly attain Buddhahood.

According to the Larger Sukhāvatīvyūha Sūtra, Amitabha Buddha, in a past life as the bodhisattva Dharmākara, gave rise to forty-eight great vows, vowing to create a Pure Land—a realm free from suffering, replete with ideal conditions for achieving Buddhahood. Among these vows, the most significant is the eighteenth vow, which promises that any being who sincerely calls upon Amitabha's name with faith and resolve will be reborn in the Pure Land. Amitabha’s past bodhisattva vows demonstrate his boundless compassion and universal aspiration to liberate all beings. Due to Amitabha's vast practice, these vows are now considered to have a great power. This is the Buddha's other power or "vow power" (願力, Chinese: yuànlì, Japanese: ganriki, Skt. praṇidhāna-vaśa) which in Pure Land Buddhism is considered to be the main condition for birth in the Pure Land.

Pure Land writers like Tanluan and Daochuo expound on this idea, seeing the power of Amitabha’s vows as the active force that enables practitioners to transcend karmic obstacles and attain birth in the Pure Land. Recitation of Amitabha’s name (nianfo) and trust in his vow power are thus framed as the primary means of liberation, transforming Pure Land Buddhism into a profoundly accessible practice.

The importance of vows extends beyond Amitabha’s example. Pure land practitioners themselves are encouraged to make vows to be born in Amitabha's Pure Land. Chinese Pure Land Patriarchs such as Ouyi Zhixu and Jixing Chewu emphasized that vows are integral to one’s spiritual orientation. Ouyi Zhixu considered making vows as one of the "three essentials" of Pure Land practice, alongside faith and practice. Zhixu thought that vows provide a clear and unwavering direction for the practitioner’s mind. By vowing to be reborn in the Pure Land, practitioners take refuge in Amitabha’s compassionate resolve, cultivating a sense of connection and focus in their spiritual journey. The practitioner's vow to be born in the Pure Land thus serves as an anchor, allowing the practitioner’s mind to remain steadfast and directed toward liberation amidst the distractions and hardships of samsara.

== Vows from Mahayana treatises ==
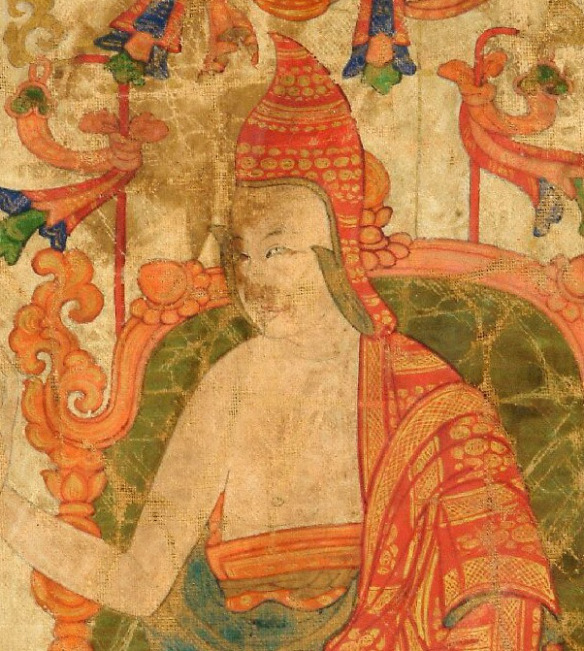
Shantideva

=== Ten vows of the Dasabhumika-vibhāsā ===
The Dasabhumika-vibhāsā (Shízhù pípōshā lùn, 十住毘婆沙論, Taisho no. 1521), attributed to Nagarjuna, contains its own set of bodhisattva vows:

1. "I vow to make offerings to, supply the needs of, and extend reverence to all buddhas."
2. "I vow that in every case I shall protect and uphold the Dharma of all buddhas.", also "I should guard and protect the Dharma of all past, future, and present buddhas of the ten directions."
3. "From that time when all buddhas depart from the Tuṣita Heaven and come back to abide in the world, on forward to the conclusion of their teaching and their eternal entry into the realm [of nirvāṇa] without residue...I vow that in all cases I shall completely devote my mind to making offerings to them [the Buddhas]".
4. "I vow to engage in the transformative teaching of beings, causing them all to enter the paths."
5. "I vow to enable all beings’ complete realization of the Buddha’s bodhi even where there are those tending toward śrāvaka-disciple or pratyekabuddha paths."
6. "Through resolute faith, I vow to cause all dharmas to enter [a state of] uniform equality." This means that "one causes all of these dharmas to enter into the gates of emptiness, signlessness, and wishlessness so that they are realized to be uniformly equal and beyond duality."
7. "Having vowed to purify the buddhalands, I shall therefore extinguish all the various forms of evil."
8. "When joining together with others in doing any single endeavor, I vow that there will be no enmity or contentiousness."
9. "I vow to practice the bodhisattva path and set turning the irreversible wheel, thereby enabling the dispelling of all afflictions and the entry into faith that is pure."
10. "I vow that, in all worlds, I shall manifest the realization of bodhi."

=== Shantideva's vow ===
The Tibetan Buddhist Tradition widely makes use of verses from chapter three of Shantideva's Bodhisattvacaryāvatāra, which is entitled Embracing Bodhicitta. Various forms of these verses are used to generate bodhicitta and take the bodhisattva vow. The set of verses which are considered to be the actual taking of the bodhisattva vow are verses 23 and 24 of the third chapter. These verses state:

Just as all the Buddhas of the past
Have brought forth the awakened mind,
And in the precepts of the Bodhisattvas
Step-by-step abode and trained,
Likewise, for the benefit of beings,
I will bring to birth the awakened mind,
And in those precepts, step-by-step,
I will abide and train myself.

In the Bodhisattvacaryāvatāra, the actual taking of the vow is preceded by various other preparatory practices and prayers, particularly what is called the Seven Branch Practice (Tib. yan lag bdun pa), often done through the recitation of a prayer. The seven branches are:

1. Prostration to the three jewels, supplicating Buddhas and bodhisattvas
2. Making physical, verbal and mental offerings to the Buddhas
3. Confessing one's negative deeds, "one admits to doing the negative deed, one feels true remorse and then one resolves not to do it again."
4. Rejoicing in the goodness and virtues of others
5. Requesting the Buddhas to turn the wheel of Dharma (to teach the way)
6. Requesting the Buddhas not to pass away into final extinction, but to keep coming back to teach and help others
7. Dedicating the merit of all good deeds for the benefit of all beings

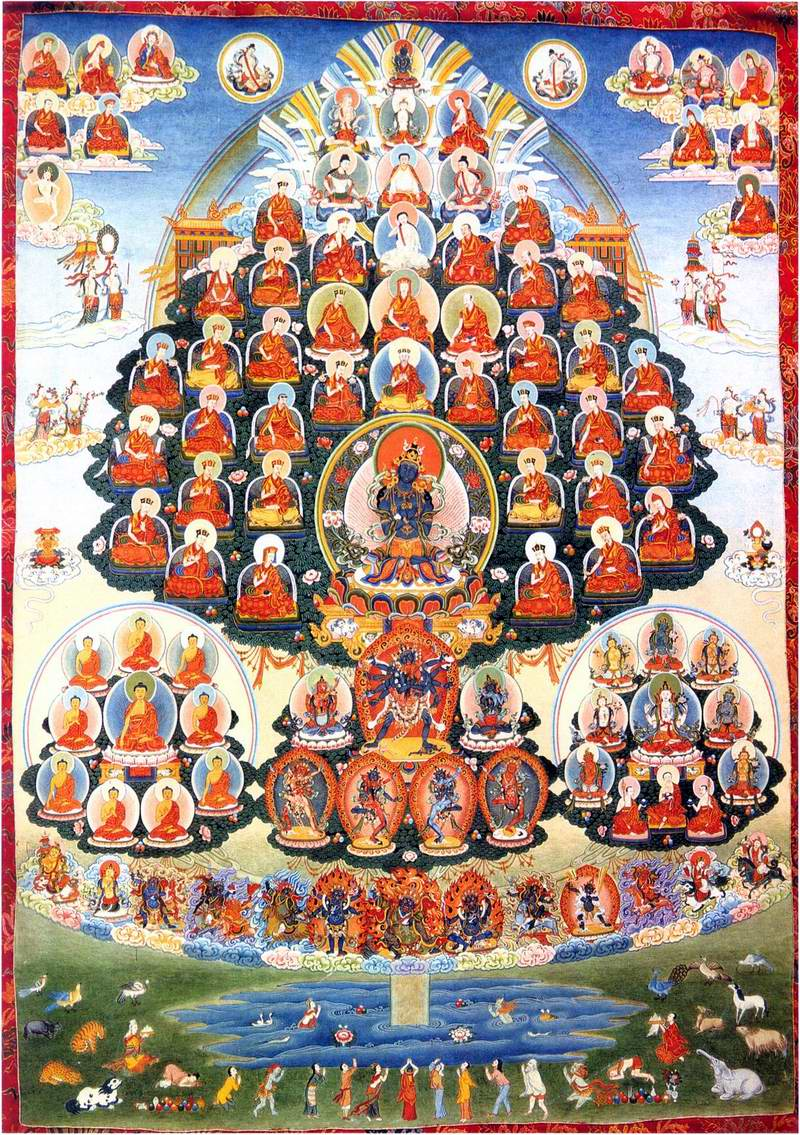
The Refuge Tree of the Kagyu school. A would-be bodhisattva may be instructed to visualize a field of Buddhas, bodhisattvas and past lineage masters while taking the vow.

The 14th Dalai Lama teaches the following way of taking the vow, which begins by reading "through the second and third chapters of the Bodhisattvacaryāvatāra up until the second line of verse 23." The Dalai Lama then writes:

In order to take this vow, we should imagine that in front of us are the Buddha and his eight close disciples; the six ornaments, and the two supreme teachers, including Shantideva; and all the realized masters of the Buddhist tradition, in particular the holders of the Sakya, Gelug, Kagyu, and Nyingma schools of Tibet—in fact, all the Buddhas and Bodhisattvas. Consider also that we are surrounded by all the beings in the universe. With this visualization, we shall now read the Seven Branch Prayer ...

Consider that we are surrounded by all the beings in the universe and generate compassion for them. Think of the Buddha and feel great devotion to him. Now, with compassion and devotion, pray, "May I attain Buddhahood!" and recite:

"Teachers, Buddhas, Bodhisattvas, listen! Just as you, who in the past have gone to bliss, Conceived the awakened attitude of mind, Likewise, for the benefit of beings, I will generate this self-same attitude."

When we recite these lines for the third time, at the words, "I will generate this self-same attitude," think that you have generated this bodhichitta in the depth of your hearts, in the very marrow of your bones, and that you will never go back on this promise. Traditionally we now recite the last nine verses of the chapter as a conclusion to taking the vow.

In Tibetan Buddhism there are two lineages of the bodhisattva vow, which are linked to two sets of Bodhisattva precepts or moral rules. The first is associated with the Cittamatra movement of Indian Buddhism, and is said to have originated with the bodhisattva Maitreya, and to have been propagated by the Indian master Asanga. The second is associated with the Madhyamaka tradition, is said to have originated with the bodhisattva Manjusri and to have been propagated by Nagarjuna, and later by Shantideva. The main difference between these two lineages of the bodhisattva vow is that in the Cittamatra lineage the vow cannot be received by one who has not previously received the pratimokṣa vows. Both traditions share a set of 18 major precepts (or "downfalls"). There are also sets of minor precepts.

=== Bodhicittotpadaviddhi ===
A ritual text on the bodhisattva vow attributed to Nāgārjuna called Bodhicittotpadaviddhi (Ritual for giving rise to bodhicitta, Tib. Byang chub mchog tu sems bskyed pa'i cho ga) has the following bodhisattva vow:

Just as the past tathāgata arhat samyaksambuddhas, when engaging in the behavior of a bodhisattva, generated the aspiration to unsurpassed complete enlightenment so that all beings be liberated, all beings be freed, all beings be relieved, all beings attain complete nirvana, all beings be placed in omniscient wisdom, in the same way, I whose name is so-and-so, from this time forward, generate the aspiration to unsurpassed complete enlightenment so that all beings be liberated, all beings be freed, all beings be relieved, all beings attain complete nirvana, all beings be placed in omniscient wisdom.

== See also ==
- Parinamana
