= Shuilu Fahui =

Chinese Buddhist ceremony

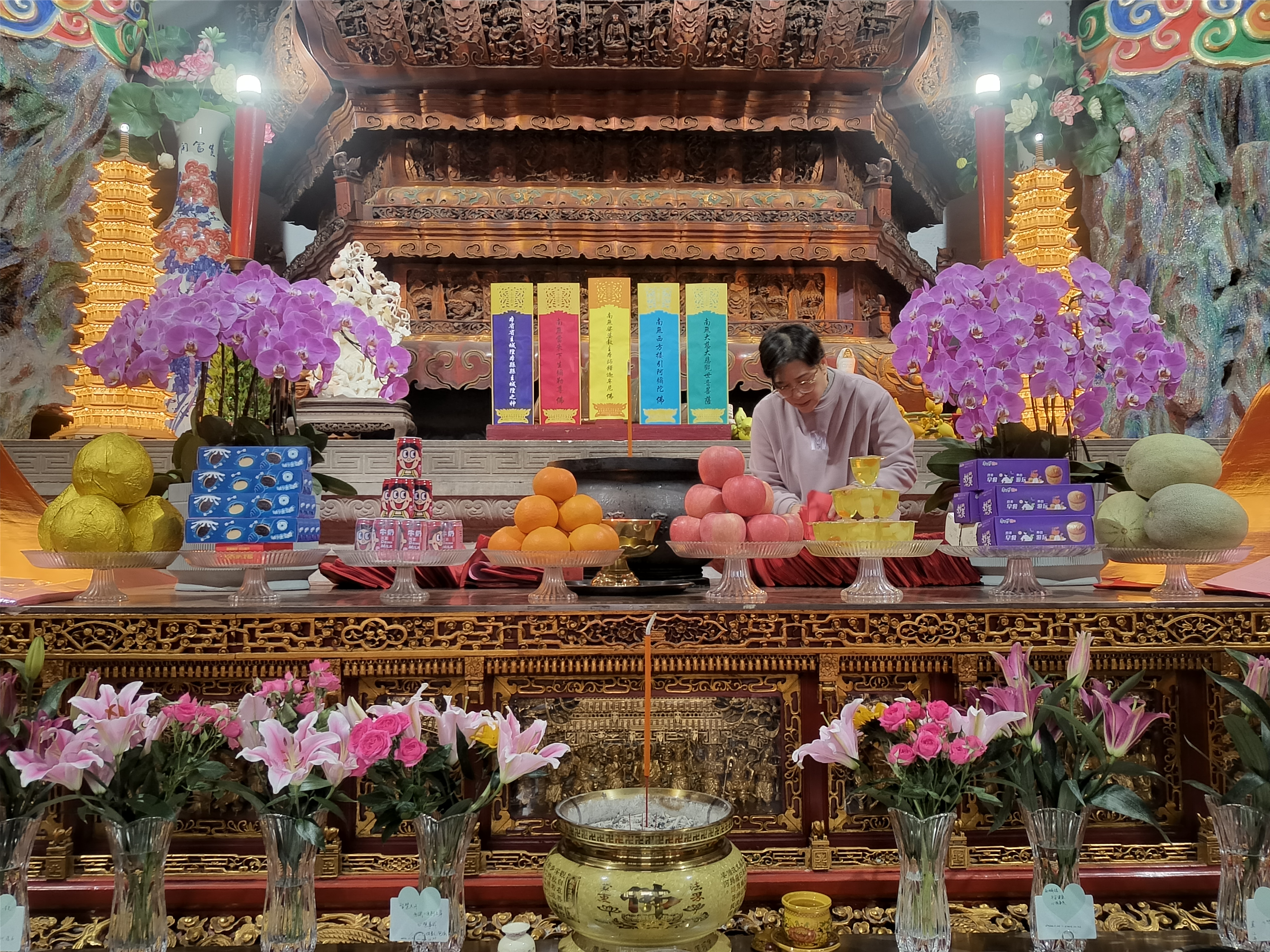
One out of multiple altars at a Shuilu Fahui ceremony held in Tianning Temple, Changzhou, China

The Shuilu Fahui (Chinese: 水陸法會; lit. 'Water and Land Dharma Assembly') is a Chinese Buddhist ceremony typically performed with the aim of facilitating the nourishment and ultimate liberation of all sentient beings in saṃsāra. The service is often credited as one of the greatest rituals in Chinese Buddhism, as it is the most elaborate and requires the labor of monastics and temple staff and the financial funding of lay Buddhist sponsors. The full name of the ceremony is the Fajie Shengfan Shuilu Pudu Dazhai Shenghui (法界聖凡水陸普度大齋勝會), which translates to "Water and Land Universal Deliverance and Grand Feast Assembly for Saints and Ordinary Sentient Beings in the Dharma Realm."

The ceremony is attributed to the Emperor Wu of Liang, who was inspired one night when he had a dream in which a monk advised him to organize a ceremony to help all beings living on land and in the seas to be surfeited from their suffering, hence the name of the rite. Traditions hold that the ritual itself was first composed by Emperor Wu, with guidance from the Chan Buddhist master Baozhi (寶志), who is traditionally regarded as an emanation of Shiyimian Guanyin (十一面觀音; lit: "Eleven-Headed Guanyin"). The liturgy received further edits and addendums in later periods, most notably by the monks Zhipan (志磐) and Zongze Cijue (宗賾慈覺) during the Song dynasty as well as the monk Yunqi Zhuhong (雲棲袾宏) during the Ming dynasty.

During the Shuilu Fahui, all enlightened and unenlightened beings in saṃsāra are invoked and invited to attend and partake in the physical and spiritual nourishment provided. In this way, the main goal of the ritual is to facilitate the nourishment and ultimate liberation of all sentient beings, including devas, asuras and humans. The ritual combines features of Chinese operatic tradition (including a wide range of instrumental music as well as vocal performances), the recitation of various sūtras and repentance rites similar to other Mahāyāna rituals as well as esoteric Vajrayāna practices (such as the recitation of esoteric mantras of Buddhist divinities and visualization practices). As a result, the Shuilu Fahui has been seen by traditional commentators as a union of the various different traditions in Chinese Buddhism, such as such as Chan, Zhenyan, Pure Land, Tiantai and Huayan.

== History ==
=== Liang dynasty to Sui dynasty (6th–7th century) ===
Traditional records state that the Shuilu Fahui ceremony originated during the reign of Emperor Wu of Liang (464–549), who was historically renowned as a devout patron of Buddhism. According to accounts, Emperor Wu had a dream one night in which a holy monk told him about a ritual called the Shuilu Guangda Mingzhai (水陸廣大冥齋, lit: "Grand and Expansive Netherworldly Ceremony for beings of Water and Land") which had the ability to deliver universal salvation to sentient beings in samsara. The next day, he consulted with ministers and śramaṇas at court about his dream, but no one had an explanation except for the Chan Buddhist master Baozhi (寶志; 418 - 514), who told him to search through the Buddhist canon. In doing so, the Emperor found a scriptural text which recounted Ānanda's encounter with a ghost king named Jiaomian (焦面; "Scorched Face").

This specific encounter is also described in two later sources that were translated during the Tang dynasty (618–907): the Foshuo Jiu Mianran Egui Tuoloni Shenzhou Jing^{[zh]} (佛說救面燃餓鬼陀羅尼神咒經; lit "Sūtra Spoken by the Buddha on the Dhāraṇī-spell that Saved the Burning-Face Hungry Ghost") which was translated by Śikṣānanda^{[zh]} between the years 700 - 704, and the Foshuo Jiuba Yankou Egui Tuoluoni Jing^{[zh]} (佛說救拔燄口餓鬼陀羅尼經; lit "Sūtra Spoken by the Buddha on the Dhāraṇī that Rescued the Flaming-Mouth Hungry Ghost") which was translated by Amoghavajra between the years 757 - 770. According to these sūtras, Ānanda once encountered a ghost king named either Mianran (面燃; lit: "Burning Face") or Yankou (燄口; lit: "Flaming Mouth") that warned him about his impending death and rebirth in the realm of hungry ghosts which would happen unless he was able to give one measure of food and drink the size of a bushel used in Magadha to each of the one hundred thousand nayutas of hungry ghosts and other beings. The encounter prompted Ānanda to beg Śākyamuni Buddha for a way to avert his fate, at which point the Buddha revealed a ritual and a dhāraṇī that he had been taught in a past life when he was a Brahmin by the Bodhisattva Avalokiteśvara, who is known in East Asia as Guanyin (觀音菩薩). Part of the ritual involved the brief invocation of the names of four Buddhas. According to the sūtra, the performance of the ritual would not only feed the hungry ghosts but would also ensure the longevity of the performing ritualist. The sūtra ends with Ānanda performing the rite according to the Buddha's instructions and avoiding the threat of rebirth into the realm of the hungry ghosts. Buddhist traditions hold that he eventually achieved longevity and attained the state of arhathood.

Using this text, the Emperor composed the ritual, which took three years to complete. In the year 505, after receiving advice of Baozhi regarding where to hold the ritual, he summoned another eminent monk, the vinaya master Sengyou, and personally took part in the first performance at Zexin Temple (澤心寺), now named Jinshan Temple (金山寺), on the island of Jinshan near Zhenjiang in modern-day Jiangsu. Traditional accounts go on to state that the text was lost in the following Chen dynasty (557–589) and Sui dynasty (581–618).

=== Tang dynasty (7th–10th century) ===
According to traditional accounts, during the Xianheng era (670–674) of the Tang dynasty (618–907) period, the Chan master Daoying (道英) of Fahai Temple (法海寺) in the capital city of Chang'an was visited by the spirit of King Zhuangxiang of Qin, who requested that he reinstate the Shuilu Fahui ceremony and told him that a copy of the ritual texts that had been lost were in the possession of a monk named Yi Ji (義濟) at Dajue Temple (大覺寺). After retrieving them, Daoying oversaw the revival of the ceremony and conducted its first performance at Shanbei Temple.

Various references to performances of Shuilu Fahui ceremonies during the Tang dynasty were recorded in the form of steles. For instance, in his compendium Baoke Congbian (寶刻叢編, lit: "Collection of Treasured Carvings"), the author Chen Si (陳思) wrote about a stele in Jiankang (modern-day Nanjing) that was made in the year 833 which he labelled a "Tang-era Inscription on Performing a Water and Land Non-Discriminatory Ceremony" (唐修水陸無遮齋題). He also wrote of another stele near Huzhou that was made in the year 863 that he labelled "Records of the Re-establishment of the Society for the Ceremony of the Netherworld and the Living World at Xingguo Temple" (重置興國寺冥陽齋社記). Another Tang-era stele called the "Record of the Water and Land Assembly of the Eastern Nengren Temple" (東能仁院水陸會記) located in Wuhu is mentioned in another book, the Yudi Beiji Mu (輿地碑記目, lit: "Compendium of Geographic Inscriptions"), by the author Wang Xiangzhi (王象之).

Historical records also document the development of shuilu ritual paintings during this time. Shuilu ritual paintings are a special style of traditional Chinese paintings based on Buddhist divinities and all other figures in Buddhist cosmology that are invoked into the ritual space during the Shuilu Fahui ceremony. These paintings are typically enshrined and arranged at various altars during the ceremony in special formations according to the ritual manual, sometimes forming a particular maṇḍala (such as is the case with the altar for the Ten Wisdom Kings). While the majority of these paintings usually depict Buddhist deities, a number of them also depicts non-Buddhist figures such as Taoist gods as well as the spirits of past emperors, officials and commoners since they are also invoked during the ceremony, being counted among the unenlightened sentient beings of saṃsāra that are invited to the ceremony to partake in the nourishment. In the Yizhou minghua lu (益州名畫錄, lit: "Record of Famous Artists from Yizhou") by the Song dynasty writer Huang Xiufu (黃休復), he records the biography of a Tang dynasty painter named Zhang Nanben (張南本), who was active in Chengdu in Sichuan from 880s onwards and who specialized in paintings of Buddhist figures, dragon kings, gods and ghosts. The biography states that, upon Emperor Xizong's return to the Tang capital of Chang'an following the end of the Huang Chao Rebellion, the prefectural magistrate Chen (府主陳太師) established a Water and Land Cloister (水陸院) at Baoli Temple (寶歷寺) and hired Nanben to paint over 120 paintings of the spirits of Heaven and Earth (天神地祗), the Three Officials and Five Emperors (三官五帝), Leigong and Dianmu (雷公電母), the spirits of mountains and marshes (嶽瀆神仙) and well as past emperors and kings (自古帝王).

=== Song dynasty (10th–13th century) ===
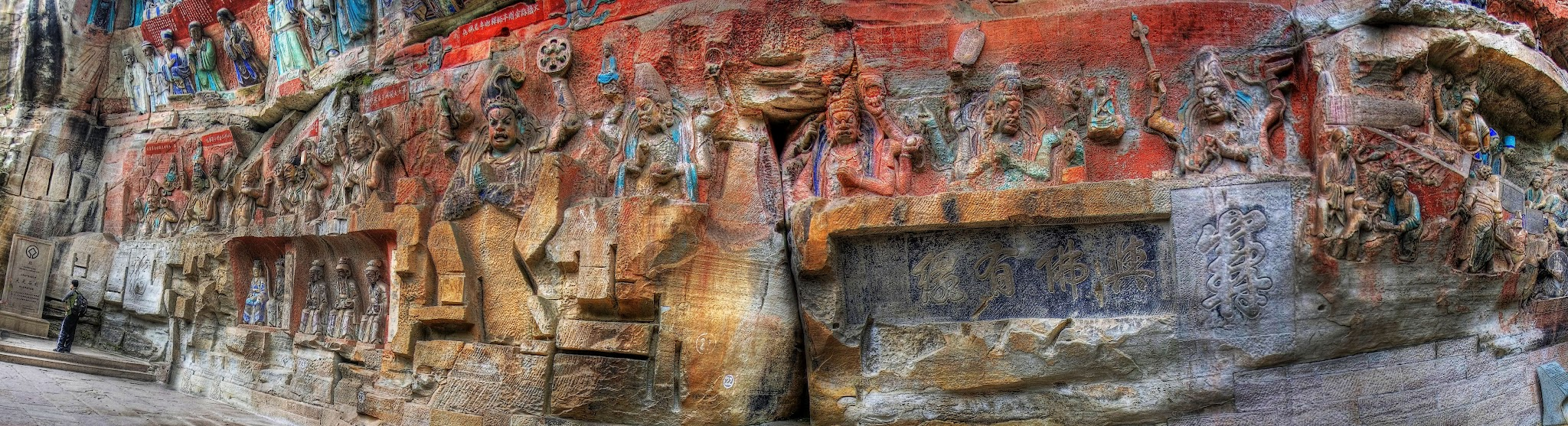
Panorama of a short segment of the carvings, showing Song dynasty (960-1279) sculptures of the Ten Wisdom Kings at the Mount Baoding section of the Dazu Rock Carvings in Chongqing, China. Various inscriptions on carvings here make references to performances of the Shuilu Fahui ceremony, and it has been suggested that the Mount Baoding site was designed and built to be a space for holding Shuilu Fahui rites.

After the Tang dynasty, Shuilu Fahui ceremonies continued to grow in popularity and were widely practiced in the succeeding Song dynasty (960–1279) by monastics, and historical records proliferated with numerous accounts of such ceremonies.

==== Imperial Patronage ====
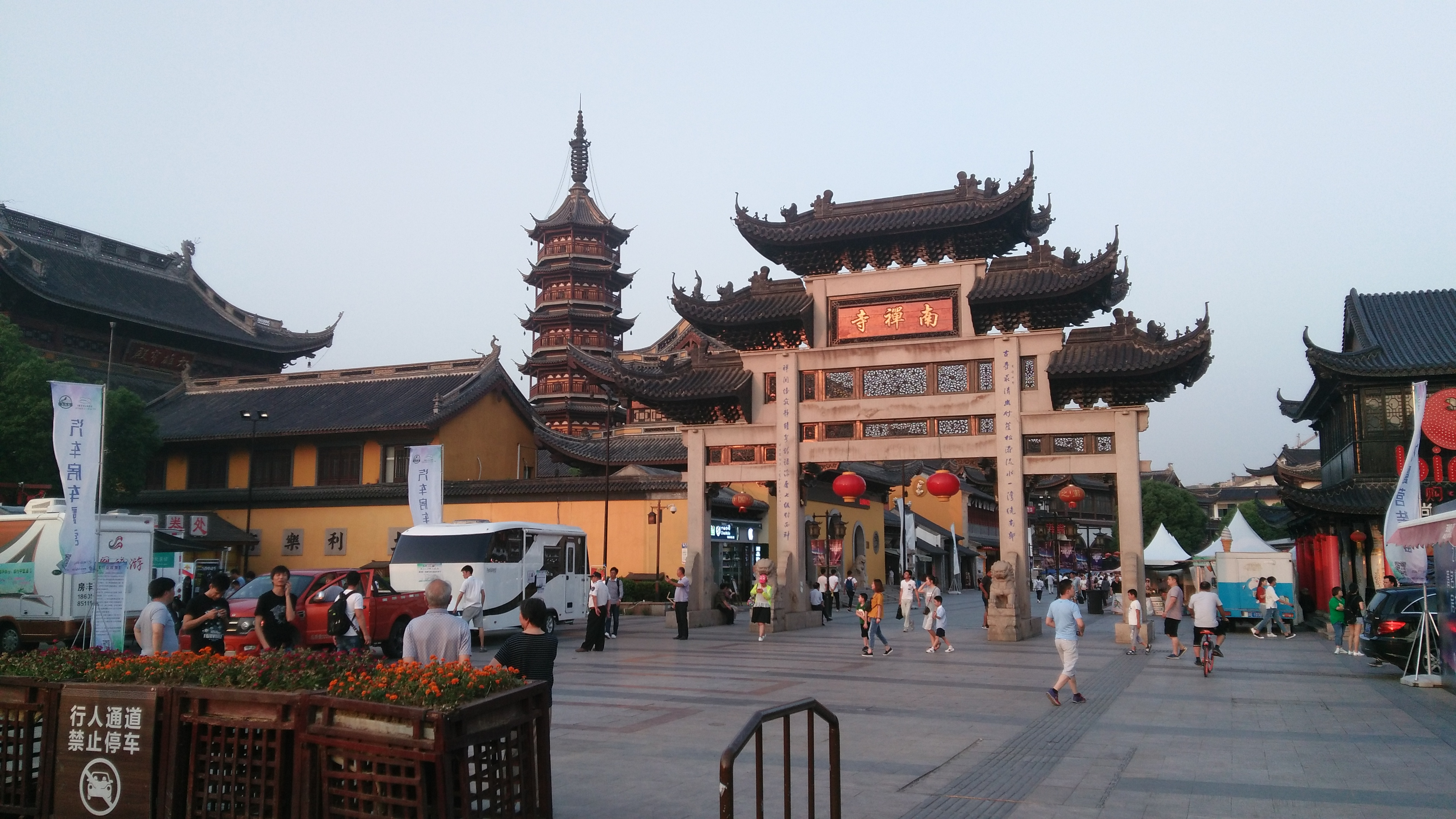
Nanchan Temple^{[zh]} in Wuxi, which was the site of one of the Shuilu Fahui ceremonies held by the Song imperial family after the death of Empress Gao (1032–1093).

In particular, it was relatively common for the imperial family and government to commission performances of the ritual, especially in times of conflict or upon the death of a political figure. Various Song-era historical documents such as the Xu Zizhi Tongjian Changbian (續資治通鑑長編), an extensive chronicle of the history of the Northern Song dynasty in 980 volumes by the historian Li Tao (李燾), and voluminous court records as well as miscellaneous writings by officials like Wang Anshi (王安石, 1021–1086) and Qi Chongli (綦崇禮, 1083–1142), make numerous mentions of multiple performances of the Shuilu Fahui ceremony being commissioned by the imperial families of both the Song dynasty and its contemporaneous rival Jin dynasty (1115–1234). The following are a few examples. Both the Song Emperor Yingzong (1032 -1067) and the Song Empress Cao (1016–1079) were commemorated with performances of the Shuilu Fahui ceremony upon their deaths. In 1081, the Song Emperor Shenzong sponsored a Shuilu Fahui ceremony at a temple in Guizhou (桂州) for the spirits of fallen soldiers and civilians from Yongzhou, Qinzhou and Lianzhou who had perished during the Song–Đại Việt war. In 1083, Emperor Shenzong commissioned another Shuilu Fahui ceremony at a temple in Mingzhou (明州, modern-day Ningbo) that was held on the eve of a one-month mourning ceremony in commemoration of the death of King Munjong (1046–1083) of Goryeo. In 1085, three Shuilu Fahui ceremonies (one taking place on the Dongzhi Festival, one taking place on Chinese New Year and one taking place on the Hanshi Festival) were commissioned and held in the Funing Palace (福寧殿) to commemorate the death of Emperor Shenzong. The famous poet Su Shi (蘇軾,1037-1101), also widely known as Su Dongpo (蘇東坡), wrote three separate poems, one for each occasion.

For the performance during the Dongzhi Festival, he wrote:

伏以:
聖神陟降，釋梵後先。
適更來復之辰，茂薦往生之福。
虔修凈供，仰導真遊。

Translation:

Be it reverently declared:
The enlightened ones and the gods ascend and descend, with Śakra and Brahma at the front and back.
Now that the cyclical day of return has come again, we offer splendid blessings for rebirth in the Pure Land.
Devoutly we prepare pure offerings, to respectfully guide him to True Enjoyment.

For the performance during the Chinese New Year, he wrote:

伏以:
棄黃屋以上賓，莫追風馭。
抱烏號而永慕，再歷春朝。
敢仗勝緣，式開凈供。
仰頌義堯之德，永追梵釋之遊。

Translation:

Be it reverently declared:
Having forsaken the August Residence to join the exalted guests, his swift chariot can no longer be pursued.
Clinging to the renowned bow Wuhao^{^α} while yearning forever, we are fated to experience yet another spring morning.
Daring to rely on excellent karmic bonds, we supplicate with pure offerings.
Praising the virtues of just Emperor Yao, forevering chasing the Enjoyment of Śakra and Brahma.

For the performance during the Hanshi Festival, he wrote:

伏以:
甚雨疾風，感春律之將變。
鉆燧改火，悼喪期之不留。
爰啟凈筵，以資冥福。
願登大覺，永濟函生。

Translation:

Be it reverently declared:
Torrential rains and ferocious winds, a reminder of the impending change of spring's rhythm.
Drilling flint to start a fire, we grieve that the period of mourning will not linger.
Thus we supplicate a pure feast, to offer netherworldly blessings.
May he attain great enlightenment, and provide eternal aid to all living beings

In 1093, at least 3 Shuilu Fahui ceremonies were held for the Song Empress Gao (1032–1093) after her death at her residence, Chongqing Palace (崇慶宮) and at Fusheng Chan Cloister (福聖禪院, modern-day Nanchan Temple^{[zh]} (南禪寺) in Wuxi). In 1131 and 1132, the Song Emperor Gaozong (1107–1187) commissioned three Shuilu Fahui ceremonies to commemorate the death of Empress Dowager Meng (1073–1131), and the poet Qi Chongli (綦崇礼) composed poetic prayer verses for a few of the occasions. The Empress Dowager had earlier been made reagent of a short-lived puppet state by the Jin empire when they invaded the Song capital of Kaifeng, but had shown loyalty to Emperor Gaozong by ending her regency and declaring him the rightful Emperor after he returned to the city in 1127. In 1134, Emperor Gaozong sponsored another Shuilu Fahui ceremony to provide relief to the spirits of fallen soldiers after the general Han Shizhong defeated a joint-invasion by forces from the Jin empire and its puppet state Pseudo-Qi at Chengzhou (承州, modern-day Gaoyou in Jiangsu). After the Jin Emperor Taizong (1075–1135) ascended the throne in 1123, he invited a sandalwood statue to Minzhong Temple (憫忠寺, modern-day Fayuan Temple) in Beijing and held a Shuilu Fahui ceremony for over seven days and nights.

==== Private patronage ====
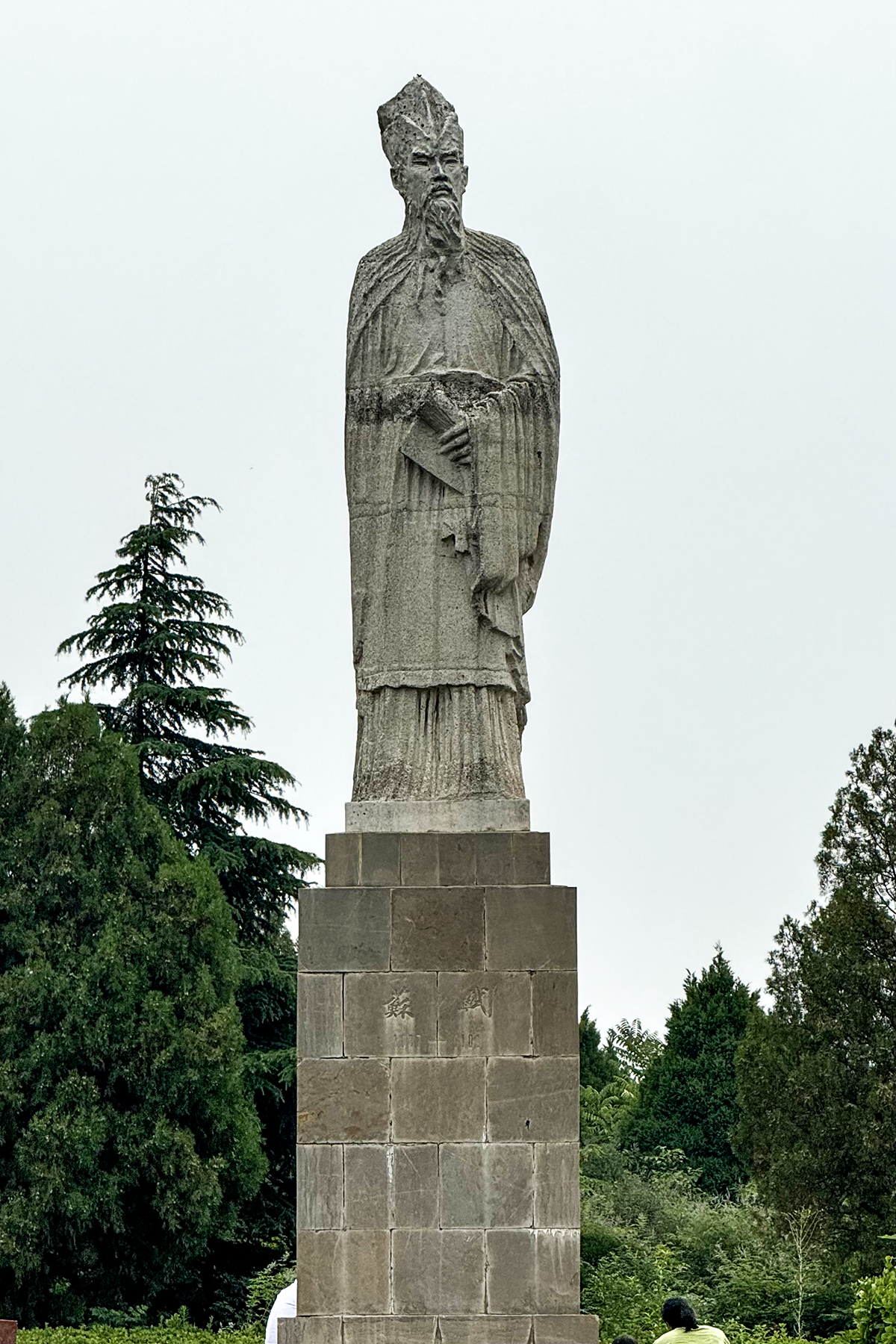
Statue of the famous poet Su Shi (1037–1101), also known as Su Dongpo, at his grave in Pingdingshan. He wrote multiple poems regarding the Shuilu Fahui ceremony and even sponsored one himself.

Outside the imperial families, Shuilu Fahui ceremonies were also widely commissioned and sponsored by private individuals including nobles, government officials and civilians. For instance, various Song era inscriptions on niches and statues at the Dazu Rock Carvings make references to multiple performances of Shuilu Fahui ceremonies, with the site itself possibly functioning as a ritual space. The government official Li Guang (李光, 1078–1159) wrote about sponsoring a performance of the ceremony at Bao'en Chan Temple (報恩禪寺) for some goats that he had raised as pets after they had been offered to him as gifts. Another example is the famous poet Su Shi (蘇軾,1037-1101) who was known for having sponsored a Shuilu Fahui ceremony and who even wrote a set of sixteen poems praising the sixteen classes of beings summoned during the ceremony titled Shuilu faxing zan (水陸法像贊, "Praises for the Dharma Images of Water and Land"). Su Shi's brother, Su Che (蘇轍, 1039–1112), also performed a Shuilu Fahui ceremony after a well beside a tomb ran dry. Shuilu Fahui ceremonies were also often commissioned by officials to mark the construction of structures such as dikes and bridges, as well as for summoning rain and controlling winds. Shuilu Fahui ceremonies became so popular that they even featured heavily in vernacular literary fiction of the time, such as the Yijian zhi (夷堅志) where performances of the ritual featured in multiple stories. Biographies of Song era monastics also indicated that some monks became known for conducting the ceremony. In the Song gaoseng zhuan (宋高僧傳, lit: "Biographies of Eminent Monks of the Song dynasty") by the scholar monk Zanning^{[zh]} (贊寧, 919–1001), he records two monks who were noted for conducting Shuilu Fahui ceremonies. The first was the monk Zunhai (遵誨, 865–945), a monk who specialized in the Lotus Sūtra and the Avataṃsaka Sūtra, who was noted as having "repeatedly performed Water and Land rituals to offer Dharma-food to spirits and ghosts, encouraging all on the dignified practice of bodhicitta". The second was the monk Shouzhen (守真, 894–971), a monk from Sichuan who was known for practicing Zhenyan, Pure Land and Huayan Buddhism and whom some consider the Eighth Patriarch of the Huayan Buddhist tradition. He was described as having "opened the Water and Land ritual space twenty times" in his lifetime.

==== Liturgical variants ====
Full digitized copy of all 54 volumes of the Fozu tongji across six books by the Song dynasty monk Zhipan (1220-1275), who also edited and published a popular version of the ritual manual for the Shuilu Fahui ceremony, which received future edits in later dynasties to result in the modern version of the ritual manual. Zhipan recorded the events leading up to his edition of the manual in the Fozu tongji.

It was during the Song era when the earliest still-existing version known of the ritual manual for the Shuilu Fahui ceremony was compiled. This version, known as the Shuilu yi (水陸儀, lit: "Water and Land manual"), was compiled by a Sichuanese upāsaka and named Yang E (楊鍔) and was widely circulated during the during the Xining period (1068–1077) of the Song dynasty. While much of the ritual manual has been lost, three fascicles survive, namely the Chu ru daochang xu jian shuilu yi (初入道場敘建水陸意, lit: "Upon First Entering the Ritual Space to Explain the Meaning of Establishing the Water and Land Altars"), the Xuanbai zhaoqing shangtang bawei shengzhong (宣白召請上堂八位聖眾, lit: "Announcement to Invite the Noble Multitudes to the Eight Seats of the Upper Hall") and the Xuanbai zhaoqing xiatang bawei shengfan (宣白召請下堂八位聖凡, lit: "Announcement to Invite the Divine and the Mundane to the Eight Seats of the Lower Hall"). In addition, Yang E also penned the Shuilu dazhai lingji ji (水陸大齋靈跡記, lit: "Record of the Miraculous Events of the Great Ceremony of Water and Land "), the earliest surviving account of the historical development of the Shuilu Fahui ceremony. In 1096, the monk Zongze Cijue (宗賾慈覺, active 11th-12th century), who was known for practicing Pure Land as well as Yunmen Chan Buddhism, finished a four volume revision of Yang E's Shuilu yi which he also titled the Shuilu yi (水陸儀, lit: "Water and Land manual"). While much of this text is not extant, it was widely circulated during the Jin (1115–1234) and Yuan (1271–1368) dynasties and formed the basis for another later Shuilu Fahui ritual text during the Ming dynasty (1368–1644) called the Tiandi mingyang shuilu yiwen (天地冥陽水陸儀文, lit: "Manual for the Ritual of All Beings of Heaven and Earth, This World and the Netherworld, and Water and Land").

In the late-Song period, another version of the ritual manual for the Shuilu Fahui ceremony, which was to become especially influential later, was compiled by the Tiantai monk Zhipan (志磐, 1220–1275), the author of the Fozu tongji (佛祖統紀, lit: "Chronicle of the Buddhas and Patriarchs"), a massive encyclopedic historiographical text in 54 volumes detailing the history of Buddhism in China from a Tiantai perspective. He recorded the events leading up to his compilation of this new ritual manual in the Fozu tongji. According to his account, a Song politician named Shi Hao (史浩, 1106–1194) once visited the island of Jinshan (where Emperor Wu of Liang participated in the first ever performance of the Shuilu Fahui ceremony according to traditional accounts) and admired the Shuilu Fahui ceremonies being carried out there. Shi Hao then donated a hundred mu of land on Mount Yuebo (月波山) and established a "Four-season Water and Land Altar"(四時水陸) there. He also personally composed ceremonial texts and had them inscribed in stone in the temple walls, as well as compiled and printed the ritual texts in the temple. His efforts impressed the Song Emperor Xiaozong, who bestowed an imperial inscription upon the temple that read: "Unobstructed Shuilu bodhimaṇḍa" (水陸無礙道場). Shi Hao's liturgy was used by up to three thousand monastics and laypeople at a monastery near Mount Yuebo called Zunjiao Temple (尊教寺), who took on the Mount Yuebo tradition of conducting universal salvation rituals during the four seasons. Eventually, some within Zunjiao Temple's community wished to adjust some aspects of the original liturgy, and so requested Zhipan, who resided at the temple, to work on a new liturgical text. Utilizing older versions of the ritual manual, Zhipan eventually finished his version in six volumes called the Shuilu yigui (水陸儀軌, lit: "Ritual Manual of Water and Land").

=== Yuan dynasty to Ming dynasty (13th century-17th century) ===
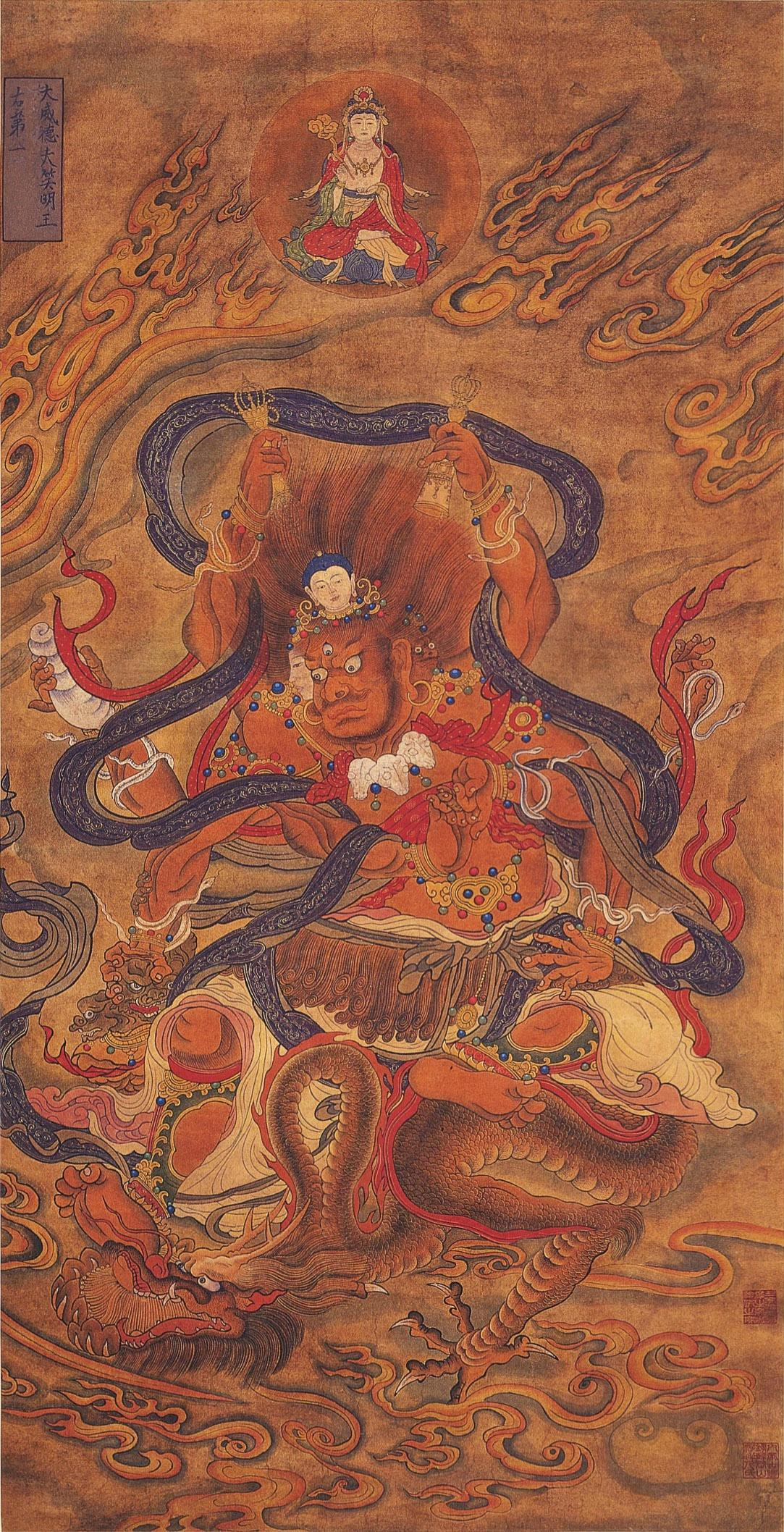
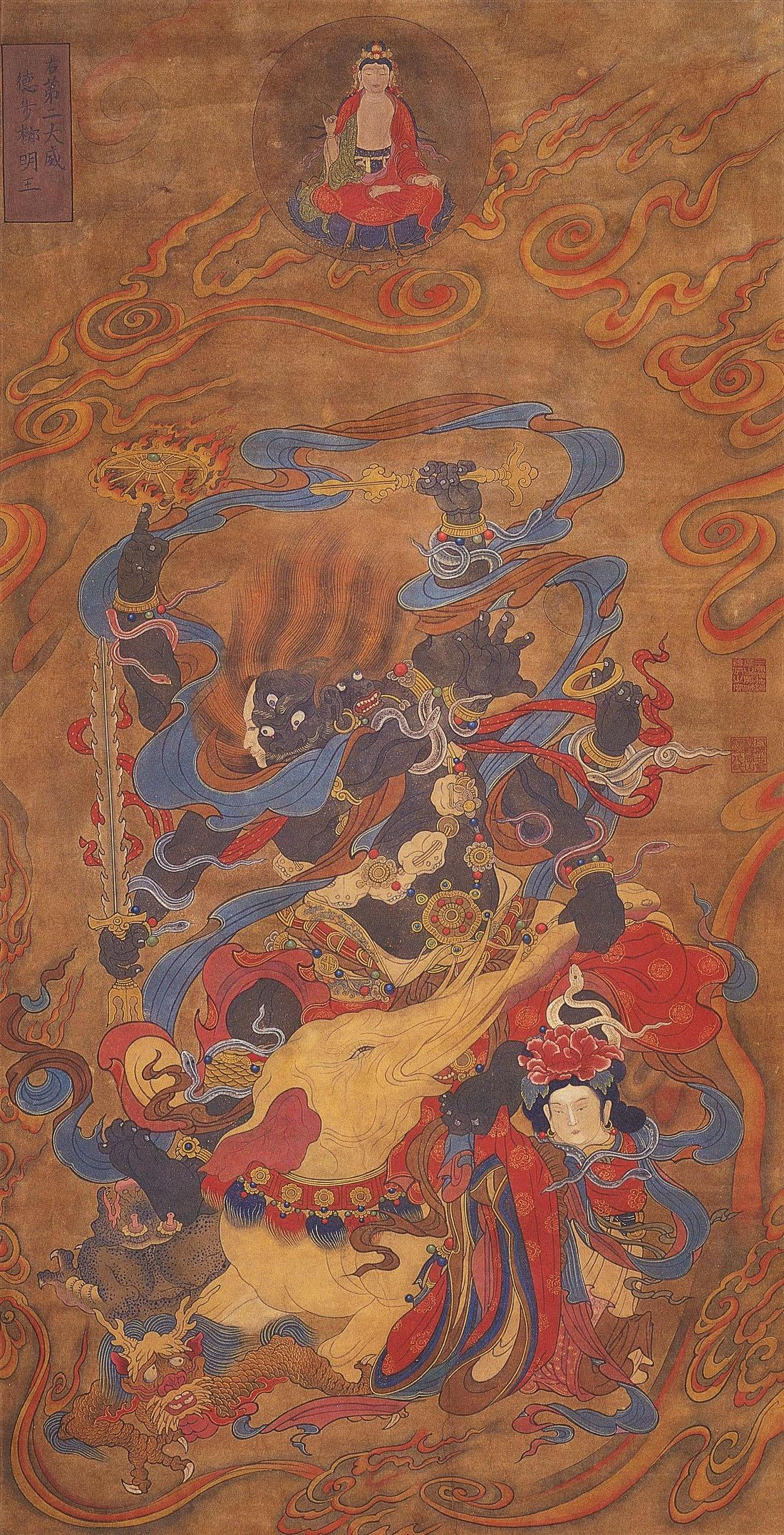
Ming dynasty (1644-1912) shuilu ritual paintings of Daxiao Mingwang (Vajrahāsa, left) and Buzhi Mingwang (Padanaksipa, right), part of a set depicting the Ten Wisdom Kings. From Baoning Temple in Shuozhou, Shanxi, China.

==== Under the Yuan dynasty ====
Shuilu Fahui ceremonies continued to remain popular under the succeeding Yuan dynasty (1271–1368), being commissioned on multiple occasions by various Emperors, who were fond of conducting Buddhist rituals. The following are a few examples. In 1316, under the Yuan Emperor Renzong (1285–1320), the imperial court held a massive Shuilu Fahui ceremony at Jinshan Temple, in which 1500 monks participated. In 1321, the Yuan Emperor Yingzong (1302–1323) commissioned over six temples: Wan'an Temple (萬安 Qingshou Temple(慶壽) Sheng'an Temple(聖安) Puqing Temple (普慶寺) in Beijing, Jinshan Temple in Zhenjiang and Wansheng Youguo Temple (萬聖祐國寺, modern-day Nanshan Temple^{[zh]}) to carry out a large-scale Shuilu Fahui ceremony which lasted over seven days and seven nights. In 1328, The Yuan Emperor Taiding (1293–1328) commissioned another Shuilu Fahui ceremony which lasted seven days and nights as well.

==== Under the Ming dynasty ====
During the succeeding Ming dynasty (1368–1644), Shuilu Fahui ceremonies became even more popular with both the imperial court and private citizenry. For instance, starting from the first year (1368) of the reign of the Ming Hongwu Emperor (1328–1398) until the fifth year (1407) of the reign of the Ming Yongle Emperor (1360–1424), the Ming imperial court consecutively held several large scale Shuilu Fahui ceremonies at Jiangshan, historically known as the Jiangshan Fahui (蔣山法會, lit: "Dharma Assembly at Jiangshan"), with invitations being sent to nearly every prominent monk from the late Yuan to early Ming period. The main purpose of performing these ceremonies was to provide salvation to the spirits of both soldiers and civilians who had perished during wartime, thereby promoting political stability and peace. Similar to earlier dynasties, the popularity of the ritual and its integral nature in the lives of the populace during this period is evident by its appearances in vernacular literature, such as the popular late-Ming novel Jinpingmei (金瓶梅). According to Hong Jingchun (洪錦淳), a notable scholar in the history of Shuilu Fahui rituals, the number of Yuan and Ming dynasty era Shuilu Fahui performances recorded in historical texts in the Chinese Buddhist canon make up only one percent of the actual total number of Shuilu Fahui ceremonies performed during this period.

==== Liturgical variants ====
In the early decades of the Ming dynasty (1368–1644), another version of the Shuilu Fahui ceremonial liturgy was published in Shanxi by the monk Yijin (義金) (active circa 1368–1424) called the Tiandi mingyang shuilu yiwen (天地冥陽水陸儀文, lit: "Manual for the Ritual of All Beings of Heaven and Earth, This World and the Netherworld, and Water and Land"). This liturgy, which was likely based on the earlier Song dynasty manual edited by Zongze, belongs to a category of variant Shuilu Fahui ritual manuals called the "Bei shuilu" (北水陸, lit: "Northern Shuilu"; first coined by the eminent Ming dynasty monk Ouyi Zhixu) as they seem to have preserved the practices of Shuilu Fahui rituals that were popular in North and West China. This manual demonstrates highly eclectic features, combining elements across Zhenyan Buddhism, Taoism, and folk beliefs. It was heavily influenced by the Vajradhātu Esoteric tradition and involved building an array of altars that largely resembles the Vajradhātu maṇḍala, as well as visualizations of seed-syllables and the conferment of samaya precepts. This version of the ritual manual was widely used to perform Shuilu Fahui ceremonies up until the late-Qing dynasty (1644–1912).

In the late-Ming period, the eminent monk Yunqi Zhuhong (1535–1615), who is the Eighth Patriarch of the Chinese Pure Land tradition, published another version of the Shuilu Fahui ritual manual. His effort was part of a Buddhist revival movement which strove to reinvigorate Buddhist monastic life and practices through means such as reformation of monastic discipline as well as standardization of ritual liturgies. Choosing the Song dynasty manual edited by Zhipan (the Shuilu yigui) as the foundation, Zhuhong revised and refined the liturgy, placing particular focus on stressing ritual order and etiquette. His edition, titled the Fajie shengfan shuilu shenghui xiuzhai yigui (法界聖凡水陸勝會修齋儀軌, lit: "Ritual Manual for Practicing the Ritual of the Water and Land Grand Assembly for Saints and Ordinary Sentient Beings in the Dharma Realm"), belongs to a category of variant Shuilu Fahui ritual manuals called the "Nan shuilu" (南水陸, lit: "Southern Shuilu"), which includes Zhipan's version of the ritual manual. Zhuhong's version of the liturgy was also widely used throughout the Ming and Qing dynasties and forms the core text of the most popular version of the Shuilu Fahui liturgy in contemporary times.

=== Qing dynasty to present (17th–21st century) ===
Full digitalized copy of a Qing dynasty (1644-1912) edition of volumes 1 to 3 (left) and 4 to 6 (right) of the ritual manual for the Shuilu Fahui across two books, published in 1899.

The ceremony remained an integral part of the Chinese Buddhist ritual field under the succeeding Qing dynasty (1644–1912), with both the Bei shuilu and Nan shuilu variants of the ceremony continuing to be performed.

During the reign of the Qing Daoguang Emperor (1782–1850), the monk Yirun (儀潤) from Zhenji Temple (真寂寺) in Hangzhou edited and expanded Zhuhong's version of the ritual manual by supplementing explanations on certain details as well as adding more content regarding the ritual's practice and rules, resulting in a six-volume work titled the Fajie shengfan shuilu shenghui xiuzhai yigui (法界聖凡水陸普度大齋勝會儀軌會本, lit: "Compiled Ritual Manual for Practicing the Ritual of the Water and Land Grand Assembly for Saints and Ordinary Sentient Beings in the Dharma Realm"). Later, the upāsaka Zhiguan (咫觀, active circa 1862–1908), also known as Zheng Yingfang (鄭應房), composed extensive commentaries regarding Zhuhong's version of the ritual manual, compiling them into a nine-volume work titled the Fajie shengfan Shuilu dazhai puli daochang xingxiang tonglun (法界聖凡水陸大齋普利道場性相通論, lit: "Comprehensive Treatise on the Nature and Characteristics of the Dharma Realm of Saints and Mortals in the Water-Land Great Retreat and Universal Beneficence Assembly"). He also wrote another text based on the Shuilu Fahui ceremony titled the Shuilu daochang falun baochan (水陸道場法輪寶懺 ,lit: "Precious Repentance of the Dharma Wheel for the Water-Land Assembly") which had ten volumes.

In the late-Qing dynasty, just before the founding of the Republic of China, the monk Fayu (法裕) also edited Zhuhong's version of the ritual, providing additional instructional details regarding the rituals to be performed at the Outer Altars as well as other ceremonial practices. In addition, a new preface for this version was written by the eminent monk Yinguang (1862–1940), who is the Thirteenth Patriarch of the Chinese Pure Land tradition. This four-volume version of the ritual manual, titled the Shuilu yigui huiben (水陸儀軌會本, lit: "Compiled Ritual Manual of Water and Land"), remains the most widely utilized version in modern contemporary Chinese Buddhist practice throughout China, Taiwan, Singapore, Malaysia and other overseas Chinese communities.

== Altars ==
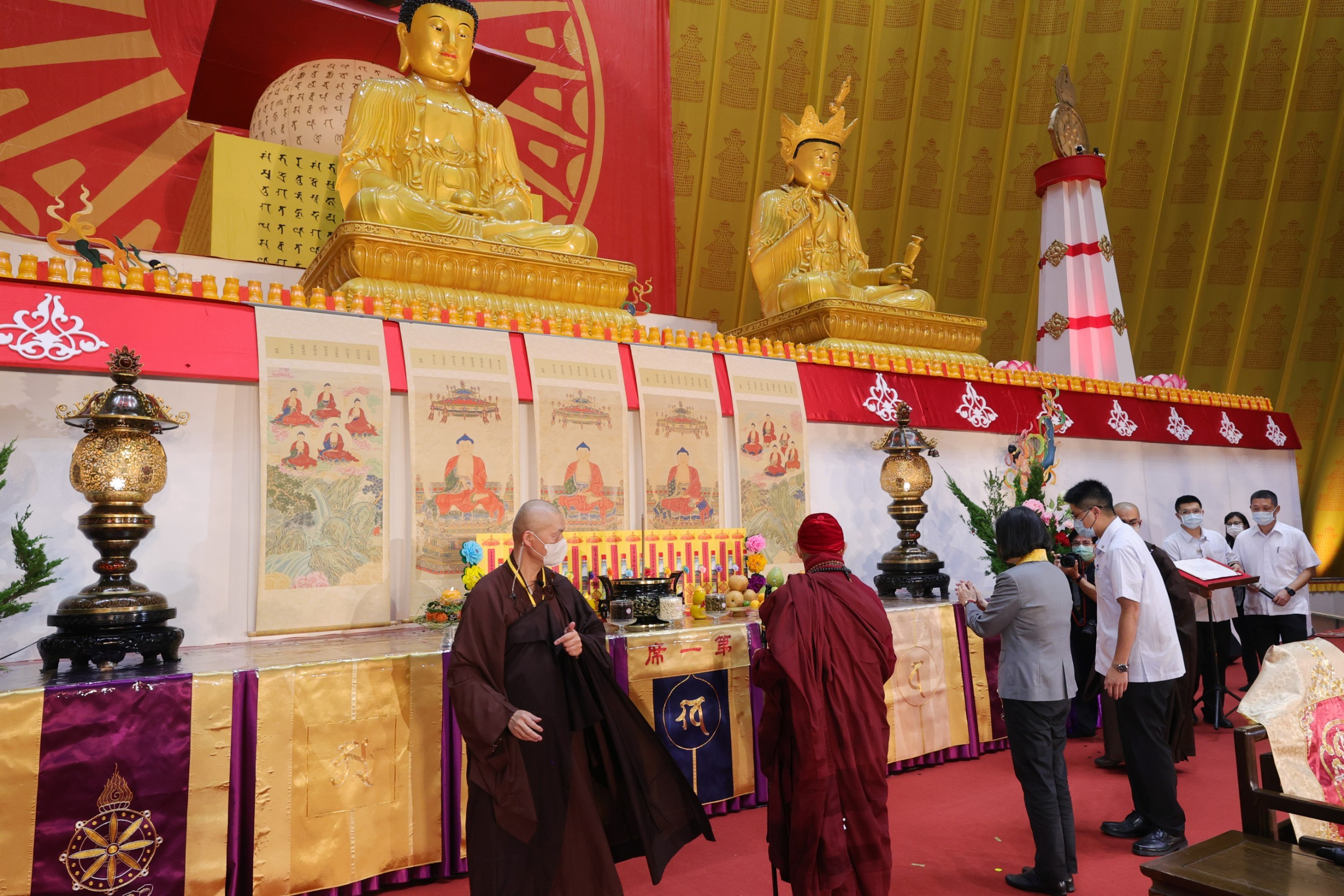
One of the altars where several shuilu ritual paintings of Buddhas are enshrined at a Shuilu Fahui ceremony held by Ling Jiou Mountain^{[zh]} (靈鷲山) in Taiwan. Then-Taiwanese President Tsai Ing-wen was invited to see the inner shrine up close when ceremonies were not in session.

In contemporary practice, the entire ritual is typically structurally divided into two types of rituals: those conducted at the Inner (內壇) and those conducted at the Outer Altars (外壇). In most cases, there is only a single Inner Altar while there are multiple Outer Alters. The Inner Altar is traditionally considered the most sacred and important part of the ritual and is where the most central rites are performed, so access to it is often restricted. In contrast, rituals at the Outer Altars are typically open to all participants. The primary focus is the Inner Altar, which infers the collective merits of the Outer Altars.

=== Inner Altar ===
The Inner Altar is the core of the entire liberation rite and the most elaborate of all the other shrines. The Inner Altar comprises twenty-four smaller altars: twelve for the higher beings and twelve for the lower beings. Each altar has their own classification ranging from other Buddhas, Bodhisattvas, Wisdom Kings, sages, and celestial protectors, down to the lower beings dwelling in the six realms of rebirth: lesser devas, demigods, humans, animals, hungry ghosts, hell beings, and deceased individuals. Each altar has a set of paper plaques decorated with paper flowers and talismans which contain the core essence of the invited spirit and a painting that describes who each of the beings are, along with a verse taken from the Inner Altar ritual text. Notably, large numbers of shuilu ritual paintings of all these being invited to the ceremony are typically enshrined at the Inner Alter. Lastly, tables are set out for the monastics and sponsors to use, complete with kneelers, the ritual text for reference, a handheld censer, and plates with flowers to use when inviting beings.

As it requires deep concentration among all of the monastics, sponsors, and guests attending, many temples usually restrict public access to the shrine so that only high ranking and assigned monks, sponsors, and special guests are invited to enter when the ritual is not in session. When a ritual session begins, apart from any pressing emergencies, no one is allowed to leave the shrine until its completion, as it is considered disrespectful to the invited beings. Offerings of food, beverages and incense, chanting and reciting of secret mantras and various sūtras, transmitting precepts and bowing in repentance on behalf of the higher and lower beings are the core procedures in the Inner Altar.

=== Outer Altar ===
The Outer Altars usually consists of separate halls in the temple, all of which are open for public participation to help create merit for the work being done in the Inner Altar. Typically, this grouping consists of a total of six or seven altars, each focusing on different scriptures and rituals, namely:

- The Great Altar (大壇), for performing the Repentance Ritual of the Emperor of Liang and other rituals like gongfo zhaitian rites (供佛齋天) where offerings are made to the Triple Gem and deities and tantric Yujia Yankou rites (瑜伽燄口) for the nourishment and salvation of hungry ghosts. Sometimes the Inner Altar is opened to the public only for the purposes of hosting the Yankou rite.
- The Lotus Altar (法華壇), for reciting the Lotus Sūtra.
- The Pure Land Altar (淨土壇), for reciting the Amitābha Sūtra and conducting Pure Land practices such as the nianfo and other devotional practices associated with the Buddha Amituofo.
- The Yaoshi Altar (藥師壇), for reciting the Medicine Buddha Sūtra and devotional practices associated with the Buddha Yaoshi.
- The Lengyan Altar (楞嚴壇), for reciting the Śūraṃgama Sūtra, including the Śūraṃgama Mantra.
- The Huayan Altar (華嚴壇), for reciting the Avataṃsaka Sūtra.
- The Various Sūtras Altar (諸經壇), for reciting various other sūtras not included at the other altars, such as the Golden Light Sūtra, the Sūtra of Perfect Enlightenment, the Diamond Sūtra, the Brahma Net Sūtra, the Amitāyus Sūtra and the Amitāyus Contemplation Sūtra.

Some individual temples or Buddhist organizations are also known to add additional altars focusing on other types of rituals and scriptures. Some examples include:

- Yuan Kuang Ch'an Monastery^{[zh]} (圓光禪寺) in Taiwan typically adds two more altars:
  - The Dizang Altar (地藏壇), for reciting the Ksitigarbha Pūrvapraṇidhāna Sūtra as well as performing the Repentance Rite of Dizang (地藏懺), which is a popular repentance ritual first instituted during the Qing dynasty (1644–1912) based on scriptures centered around the Bodhisattva Dizang, such as the Ksitigarbha Pūrvapraṇidhāna Sūtra, the Daśacakra Kṣitigarbha Sūtra^{[zh]} and the Sūtra for Discernment of the Consequences of Wholesome and Unwholesome Karma^{[zh]}.
  - The Great Compassion Altar (大悲壇), for reciting the Chapter on the Universal Gate of the Bodhisattva Guanyin from the Lotus Sūtra and the Nīlakaṇṭha Dhāraṇī, which is popularly known in Chinese as the "Dabei zhou".
- Dharma Drum Mountain, an international Buddhist organization founded by the eminent monk Sheng-yen, has added several more altars at some of their ceremonies:
  - The Dizang Altar (地藏壇), for reciting the Ksitigarbha Pūrvapraṇidhāna Sūtra as well as performing the Repentance Rite of Dizang.
  - The Prayer Altar (祈願壇), for reciting the Chapter on the Universal Gate of the Bodhisattva Guanyin from the Lotus Sūtra and the Dabei zhou as well as performing the Dabei Chan (大悲懺, lit: "Great Compassion Repentance"), which is another popular repentance ritual first instituted during the Song dynasty (960–1279) by the Tiantai patriarch Siming Zhili based on the Dabei zhou and the eleven-headed thousand-armed form of the Bodhisattva Guanyin.
  - The Chan Altar (禪壇), for practicing Chan meditation, such as zuochan meditation and jingxing meditation, as well as reciting the Platform Sūtra.
  - The Yujia Yankou Altar (瑜伽焰口壇), for performing the Yujia Yankou rite.
  - The Ten Thousand Practices Altar (萬行壇), which is devoted to the cultivation of the Six Paramitas and the Four Embracing Virtues through volunteer work in serving and supporting the ceremony in performing tasks such as preparing food, clothing, shelter and transportation for the ceremony's participants.

== Procedures ==
Before the ceremony can take place, a purification of the entire temple or monastery space must be completed, usually presided by the abbot or elder monastics. Once it is finished, the outer and Inner Altars are opened and all will simultaneously start their own service. Even as the ritual in both the inner and Outer Altars are being held throughout the day and night, the routine morning and evening sessions of chanting and meditation in the monastery or temple are not neglected; some sponsors may choose to stay in retreat at the monastery during that time to join the daily sessions.

The ritual at the Inner Altar begins with a series of preparatory work, including setting up the altar as well as purifying the ritual space. This is followed by the invocation of various protective deities and their attendants, including the Ucchuṣma, all the Ten Wisdom Kings, the Twenty-Four Protective Deities and the Eight Legions of Devas and Nagas via visualizations and the chanting of mantras. Both the Buddha Mahāvairocana and Bodhisattva Guanyin are then invited to the ritual space via visualization chanting of mantras in order to empower incantatory water, which is then used to purify and seal the ritual space. Later, ‘talisman-holding messengers’ (持符使者) are dispatched to invite all beings in the realm of ten directions to the ceremony. In the rest of the ritual at the Inner Altar, offerings are made to all the assembled beings and Buddhist teachings and precepts are conferred on the spirits of the dead. At the end, the merits of the ritual are dedicated to all sentient beings and the invited assembly of beings are sent off.

At the Outer Altars, a variety of rituals are performed, such as repentance rites (懺悔), gongfo zhaitian rites (供佛齋天) where offerings are made to the Triple Gem and deities, tantric Yujia Yankou rites (瑜伽燄口) for the nourishment and salvation of hungry ghosts, as well as the reciting of various major sūtras in Chinese Buddhism.

=== Procedures for the Inner Altar ===
The inner altar section consists of the following subsections:

1. Setting up the boundary and performing ritual purification (啟壇結界)
2. Issuing the invitations and hanging the banners (發符懸幡)
3. Inviting the saintly beings (請上堂)
4. Making offerings to the saintly beings (供上堂)
5. Issuing petitions for amnesty (告赦)
6. Inviting the mundane beings (請下堂)
7. Precepts for the netherworldly beings (幽冥戒)
8. Making offerings to the mundane beings (供下堂)
9. Final offering of completion (圓滿香)
10. Seeing off the guests (送聖)
- Setting up the boundary and performing ritual purification (啟壇結界): Through the recitation of secret mantras, a ritual purification and boundary is placed around the Inner Altar to protect it from negative influences, allowing the rite to progress without outside hindrances, and for all beings to be invited without obstruction.
- Issuing the invitations and hanging the banners (發符懸幡): A ritual writ of invitation describing the intent of the main donors that the liberation rite is occurring at the temple is issued by the presiding masters. This is done in the form of a paper horseman who is tasked with issuing the invite. This paper horseman is then burned outside the temple premises. Meanwhile, a giant banner (for the higher beings) and lanterns (for the lower beings) are raised on tall bamboo stalks or flagpoles, a paper effigy sentry is erected outside the Inner Altar, and a ceremonial bulletin announcing the liberation rite and who the sponsors are ritually marked by the temple abbot using a calligraphy brush.
- Inviting the saintly beings (請上堂): A cloth bridge and pavilion for bathing is set up to invite deities from the higher realms to be present for the ritual. The invitation of each deity into the ritual space involves the presiding monastic chanting a gāthā praising the deity, followed by each deity's specific mantra. The list of deities invoked includes the Five Wisdom Buddhas, the Bodhisattva Guanyin, the Ten Wisdom Kings, Ucchusma and the Twenty-Four Protective Deities.
- Making offerings to the saintly beings (供上堂): Once invited, offerings of incense, food, flowers, and other delicacies are made, all while the Dharma teaching is ritually imparted.
- Issuing petitions for amnesty (告赦): A petition is issued specifically to Brahma, Sakra, deities from the lower realms and locality gods to grant reprieve to lower beings to allow them to be present for the liberation rite. Another paper horseman is ritually burned and sent off.
- Inviting the mundane beings (請下堂): As in the previous invitation, a cloth bridge is set up to welcome lower beings into the Inner Altar. Esoteric mantras are recited to bring the beings from the lower and hell realms to be present for the ritual.
- Making offerings to the mundane beings (供下堂): More offerings of incense, food, flowers, and other delicacies are made as the Dharma teaching is imparted.
- Precepts for the netherworldly beings (幽冥戒): In the evening, the presiding masters will invoke teachings to the invited lower beings. The registered ancestral or deceased relations of the main sponsors will also ritually receive the precepts by proxy.
- Final offering of completion (圓滿香): A final offering of incense, food, drink, and flowers are made to all invited beings.
- Seeing off the guests (送聖): The last ritual is often the most elaborate and elegant of the rituals, as it involves rare musical performance from monastics and invited orchestral bands. Each of their effigies in the Inner Altar (in the form of paper plaques) are paraded on the temple grounds and collectively placed onto a paper boat and burned, symbolizing their ascent to the Pure Land. The burning of the boat serves as an aid to visualizing the beings ascent and also serves to mark the conclusion of the liberation rite.

=== Required recited texts and rituals for the Outer Altars ===
While the Inner Altar is conducting the ritual, separate shrines will also conduct their own sessions for reciting sūtra texts. Because of the large requirement of sūtra texts and rituals, the responsibility is often divided among the invited monastic Sangha. Therefore, having one monastic reciting a text will count toward having one required text recited.

The required texts for the Outer Altars as suggested by Chan Master Baozhi are the following:

- 1 recitation of the Avataṃsaka Sūtra (because of its length and time constraints, it is usually divided by sections and traditionally read silently by the most senior bhikkhus)
- 24 recitations of the Śūraṅgama Sūtra
- 24 recitations of the Lotus Sūtra
- 24 recitations of the Golden Light Sūtra
- 24 recitations of the Sūtra of Perfect Enlightenment
- 24 recitations of The Amitāyus Sūtra
- 24 recitations of the Amitāyus Contemplation Sūtra
- 120 recitations of the Diamond Sūtra
- 120 recitations of the Medicine Buddha Sūtra
- 48 recitations of the Brahma Net Sūtra chapter on the bodhisattva precepts
- 2 recitations of the Ksitigarbha Pūrvapraṇidhāna Sūtra
- 24 recitations from the Repentance Ritual of the Emperor of Liang
- 2 general repentances
- A minimum of 7 full days of reciting the Amitābha Sūtra and reciting the name of Amitabha Buddha

In addition, during the duration of the liberation rite, one ritual session is held in the early morning for offering to the Triple Gem and Twenty-Four Guardian Deities, and five tantric Yujia Yankou ritual sessions are held at night for hungry ghosts. Some temples and monasteries may elect to include more than the prescribed texts listed.

== Practice ==
The Shuilu Fahui ceremony is common in mainland China and Hong Kong, where many temples hold it at least once a year on particular structured dates as part of a fixed yearly cycle of festivals. In modern times, it has become usual for some temples to prepare months or years in advance by having the monastics practice and master the ritual's proceedings ahead of time. The ceremony is also popular in Chinese communities outside mainland China, such as Taiwan where various temples have held Shuilu Fahui ceremonies every year, sometimes in the name of praying for the country and raising funds.

Other than its religious significance, the Shuilu Fahui ceremony also provides an avenue for monasteries to demonstrate social engagement with the public and engage in charity works. Because of the ceremony's exquisite and very detailed ritual procedure, it often requires a non-trivial amount of funds to prepare and hold. Such funds are usually raised through sponsorships and donations from lay followers and practitioners. In many cases, funds raised from donations to temples for a given Shuilu Fahui ceremony are donated to various types of social welfare organizations.

Because holding a Shuilu Fahui ceremony might also affect a temple financially in some cases, this can be seen as a way of demonstrating skillful means by showing the importance of the concept of anatta, or non-self, in Buddhism, while still dedicating merits to relieve suffering in all beings.

== Ritual manual ==
Full digitalized text of the ritual manual

Modern edition of the ritual manual, published by Shanghai Buddhist Books.

== See also ==
- Yujia Yankou
- Dabei Chan
- Yaoshi Bao Chan
- Fanbai
- Chinese Buddhist liturgy
- Suryukjae
- Monlam Prayer Festival
- Shuni-e

== Notes ==
^α The bow Wuhao is a legendary bow said to have belonged to the Yellow Emperor. According to tradition, when the Yellow Emperor ascended to the heavens on a dragon, his subjects were said to have clung onto Wuhao while wailing in grief. Hence, the term "clinging to Wuhao" eventually became a metaphor for mourning for a deceased individual.
