= Dabei Chan =

Chinese Buddhist repentance rite

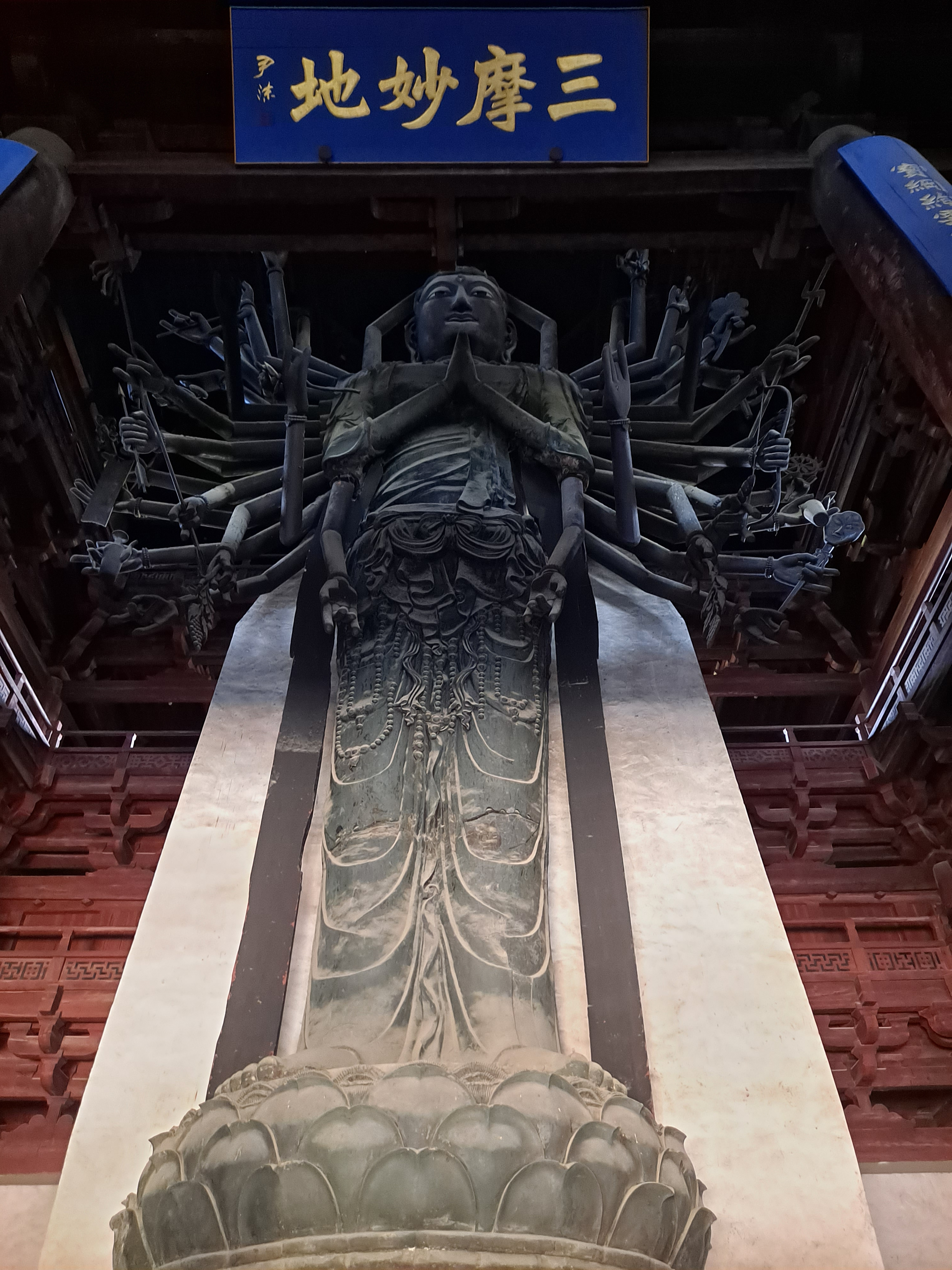
Colossal 21.3 metre bronze Song dynasty (960–1279) statue of Qianshou Qianyan Guanyin enshrined in the Guanyin Dian of Longxing Temple in Hebei, China. She is the main figure whom the Dabei Chan is centered around.

The Dabei Chan (Chinese: 大悲懺; lit. 'Great Compassion Repentance') is a Chinese Buddhist repentance rite typically performed in order to cleanse one's negative karma, purify the mind and generate merits. The ritual was first composed by the eminent Song dynasty (960–1279) Tiantai Patriarch Siming Zhili (四明知禮, 960–1028) and is based around the Nīlakaṇṭha Dhāraṇī, a mantra that is closely associated with the esoteric thousand-armed and thousand-eyed form of the Bodhisattva Guanyin known as Qianshou Qianyan Guanyin (千手千眼觀音, lit: "Thousand-Armed and Thousand-Eyed Guanyin"). The ritual liturgy received further edits and addendums in later periods, most notably by the Vinaya master Jianyue Duti (見月讀體, 1601–1679) during the Qing dynasty.

In modern times, this rite remains one of the most popular rites in the Chinese Buddhist ritual field, being performed at least once a month or more in most Chinese Buddhist temples, both on its own and as part of larger events such as the Shuilu Fahui ceremony.

== History ==
=== Han dynasty (3rd century BCE-3rd century CE) ===
==== Antecedents of repentance rites ====
Repentance rites originated from confession rituals, known as Uposatha, in Indian Buddhism. According to the Pali Canon, this consisted of confessing one's offenses and reciting the Pāṭimokkha on the Uposatha days (full and new-moon days). The purpose of the Uposatha, which were only to be held with at least four bhikkhus with no lay followers allowed, is to prevent the decline of the sangha communities. The full ritual proceedings of the Uposatha consists of the preparation and the recitation of the Pāṭimokkha to be performed by an experienced and competent (or most senior) bhikkhu while the rest of the sangha members listen.

==== Transmission to China ====
As early as the first century BCE before Buddhism was transmitted to China, several repentance scriptures in Sanskrit were already in circulation in India, with a key example being the Triskandhadharma Sūtra (三品悔過經), which was later translated to Chinese by the eminent monk Dharmarakṣa and constitutes a chapter in the Mahāratnakūṭa Sūtra. Two of the earliest repentance scriptures translated into Chinese approximately in the middle of the second century CE are the Foshuo Asheshiwang Jing (佛說阿闍世王經, lit: "The Buddha Speaks of King Ajātaśatru Sūtra") and the Foshuo Shelifu Huiguo Jing (佛說舍利弗悔過經, lit: "The Buddha Speaks of Śāripūtra Repentance Sūtra"). Consequently, over the next four centuries, a total of sixty-one repentance scriptures were translated into Chinese.

=== Northern and Southern dynasties to Tang dynasty (5th century-10th century) ===
==== Popularity of repentance rites in China ====
By the time of the Northern and Southern dynasties (420–598), various repentance liturgies were in circulation in China. A few examples are the Zhong Jing Chanhui Miezui Fangfa Sanjuan (眾經懺悔滅罪方法三卷, lit: "Methods on Eradicating Transgression by Repentance from Various Sūtra in three fascicles"), which was compiled in 517 by the Liang dynasty monk Baochang (寶唱), the Foshuo Foming Jing (佛說佛名經, lit: "Sūtra of the Buddha Names"), which was compiled in 524 by the Northern Wei dynasty monk Bodhiruci (菩提流支), and the Fahua Sanmei Chanyi (法華三昧懺儀, lit: "Lotus Samadhi Repentance Ritual"), which was compiled by the eminent monk and founder of the Tiantai tradition, Zhiyi. The Fahua Sanmei Chanyi (Japanese: Hokke Zanmai Sengi) is still practiced in modern times by contemporary Chinese Tiantai monastics as well as Japanese Tendai monastics. Another prominent example of a repentance rite that was composed during this period is the Liang Huang Bao Chan (梁皇寶懺, lit: "Repentance Ritual of the Emperor of Liang"). This extensive ritual, which was originally composed by the eminent Chan Buddhist master Baozhi (寶志, traditionally regarded as an emanation of Shiyimian Guanyin) on behalf of Emperor Wu of Liang, has remained highly popular in modern Chinese Buddhist practice and is frequently referred to as the "king of repentance rites" (懺法之王) among practitioners. It is typically performed on an annual or even more frequent basis in most Chinese Buddhist temples, sometimes as part of a larger event like the Shuilu Fahui ceremony.

As the popularity and number of repentance rites continued to grow, eminent Sui (581–618) and Tang dynasty (618–907) Buddhist masters and patriarchs such as Zhiyi, Daoxuan and Huineng started to proposed several different schemes of classifying the different rites. In general, these schemes can generally be classified into three types of repentance rituals depending on the severity of the offenses and purposes:

- Communal repentance (作法懺悔): Solely for Buddhist monks and nuns who have violated any of their precepts, except the four parajika offenses which entail expulsion from the sangha. Usually held on the days of new and full moon or Uposatha, the precepts are recited according to the seven categories. At the end of each category, the Buddhist monks and nuns are expected to confess if they have violated any of the precepts; otherwise, they remain silent.
- Visionary or auspicious sign repentance (觀相懺悔): Can be practiced by both monastics and lay people, especially when lay people want to undergo ordination with the bodhisattva precepts of the Brahmajāla Sūtra. For monastics, the bodhisattva precepts are transmitted last as part of their ordination. This type of repentance is usually performed in order to receive the bodhisattva precepts or for purification purposes if a monastic or lay person has violated any of their precepts, except the five grave offenses.
- Unborn or markless repentance (無生懺悔 or 無相懺悔): Cultivation of this form of repentance mostly entails giving rise to bodhicitta, having compassion for all sentient beings, and deeply examining the source of transgression to see that all dharms, including the nature of one's transgression or offense, is itself empty and has no one to cling to. According to both Zhiyi and Huineng, this form of repentance could eradicate innumerable eons of past major transgressions.

==== Translation and popularization of the Nīlakaṇṭha Dhāraṇī (Dabei zhou) ====
Full digitalized copy of a Song dynasty (960–1279) edition of Bhagavaddharma's translation of the Dabei zhou Sūtra, from Guangsheng Temple. Printed in 1149.

During the Tang dynasty (618–907), Zhenyan Buddhism grew in prominence, and various eminent tantric masters like Vajrabodhi and Amoghavajra were patronized by the Tang imperial court. At the same time, more esoteric and tantric scriptures began to be translated from Sanskrit to Chinese. A key sūtra that was translated in this milieu was a dharani sūtra devoted to the tantric form of the Bodhisattva Guanyin known as Qianshou Qianyan Guanyin (千手千眼觀音, lit: "Thousand-Armed and Thousand-Eyed Guanyin"), often shortened to just Qianshou Guanyin. The sūtra introduced a mantra associated with Qianshou Guanyin called the Nīlakaṇṭha Dhāraṇī, which is popularly known in Chinese as the Dabei zhou (大悲咒, lit: "Great Compassionate Mantra"). This dharani has remained in popular usage in East Asian Buddhism in contemporary times. Various different translations of the sūtra (and the mantra within) exists, including versions by Vajrabodhi, Amoghavajra and Dhyānabhadra. The version of the mantra currently considered to be the standard in most of East Asia is the shorter version found in the Qianshou Qianyan Guanshiyin Pusa Guangda Yuanman Wu'ai Dabeixin Tuoluoni Jing (千手千眼觀世音菩薩廣大圓滿無礙大悲心陀羅尼經, lit: "Sūtra of the Vast, Perfect, Unimpeded Great-Compassionate Heart of the Thousand-Handed Thousand-Eyed Bodhisattva Avalokitasvara's Dhāraṇī") translated by a monk from western India named Bhagavaddharma (伽梵達摩) between 650 and 660 CE.

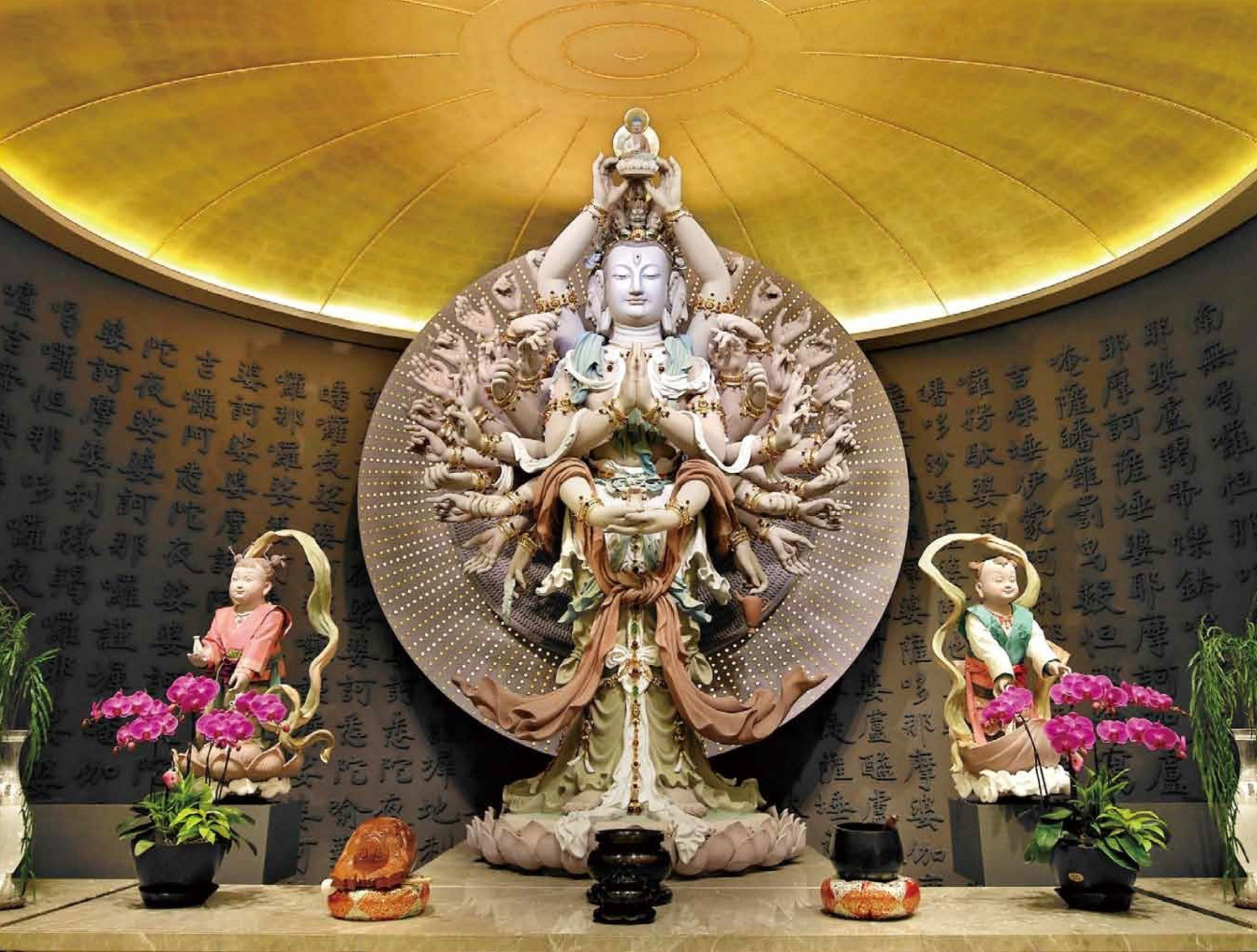
Statue of Qianshou Qianyan Guanyin at the main hall of Fo Guang Shan Buddha Museum, which is affiliated with the international Buddhist organization Fo Guang Shan. The Dabei zhou is inscribed on the wall behind the statue.

From the Tang dynasty (618–907) through to the Song dynasty (960–1279), usage of the Dabei zhou grew in popularity among both monastics and laypeople as a result of its efficacy in exorcising spirits and healing the sick. For instance, various dharani pillars inscribed with the Dabei zhou began to be erected, with the earliest known example being one that was built in Wolong Temple in the Tang capital of Chang'an in 871. Historical records also mention the dharani's usage by monastics in ritual contexts. For instance, the Song Gaoseng Zhuan (宋高僧傳, lit: "Biographies of Eminent Monks of the Song dynasty") by the scholar monk Zanning (贊寧) includes the biographies of several monks who were noted for having used the dharani extensively to accomplish tasks such as curing diseases and exorcising evil spirits. Extant manuscripts from sites like Dunhuang show that the sūtra and its dharani was disseminated widely among monastics and laity alike by the end of the Tang dynasty, with copies being made either as pious offerings or commissioned by the faithful for religious merit. The mantra also began appearing in numerous records and collections of short tales. For instance, the Tang dynasty Guangyi Ji (廣異記, lit: "Record of Marvelous Tales") by Dai Fu has several stories featuring Guanyin, including one where the protagonist used the Dabei zhou to exorcise demons causing malaria and frighten off beings who were tormenting his sister. As a protagonist was not a monk, the story showed that even ordinary people knew the power of the dharani and knew how to recite it. Another example is the Song dynasty Yijian Zhi (夷堅志, lit: "Record of Yijian") by Hong Mai, which contained forty-nine stories about chanting spells and twelve about chanting the names of deities. Of these, the Dabei zhou was recited eleven times, and Guanyin's name seven times, with the spell being used seven times to vanquish evil ghosts and twice to heal while the name is used five times to heal. In addition, out of these sixty-one cases of religious activities, over thirty-four involved laymen and twenty-five involved religious specialists such as monks, priests and shamans. Hence, by the Song dynasty, knowledge about the power of the Dabei zhou to subdue demons and cure diseases was already widespread among both monastics and lay-followers, who were chanting it on a regular basis.

=== Five Dynasties and Ten Kingdoms period to Song dynasty (10th century-13th century) ===
==== Usage of the Dabei zhou for repentance ====
The first historical reference to the Dabei zhou being used during a repentance service was found in the record of the daily religious practice of the eminent Chan Buddhist master Yongming Yanshou (永明延壽), who is the Third Patriarch of the Fayan Chan tradition and the Sixth Patriarch of the Chinese Pure Land tradition as well as widely regarded as an emanation of the Buddha Amitābha in Chinese Buddhist tradition. In the Zhijue Chanshi Zixing Lu (智覺禪師自行錄, lit: "Record of Self-cultivation of Chan Master Zhijue") compiled by his disciple Wen Chong (文沖), Yongming was noted to have recited the "Great Compassion Dharani of the Thousand-handed and Thousand-eyed Kuan-yin six times every day, in order to repent for the sins of all sentient beings in the Dharma Realm, which they commit with their six senses.” In addition, during evenings, Yongming would “light incense for all sentient beings of the ten directions and recite the Prajna Dharani [the dharani in the Heart Sūtra] and the Great Compassion Dharani. Pray for them to understand their own minds to be as perfect and clear as Prajna.”

==== Composition of the Dabei Chan ====
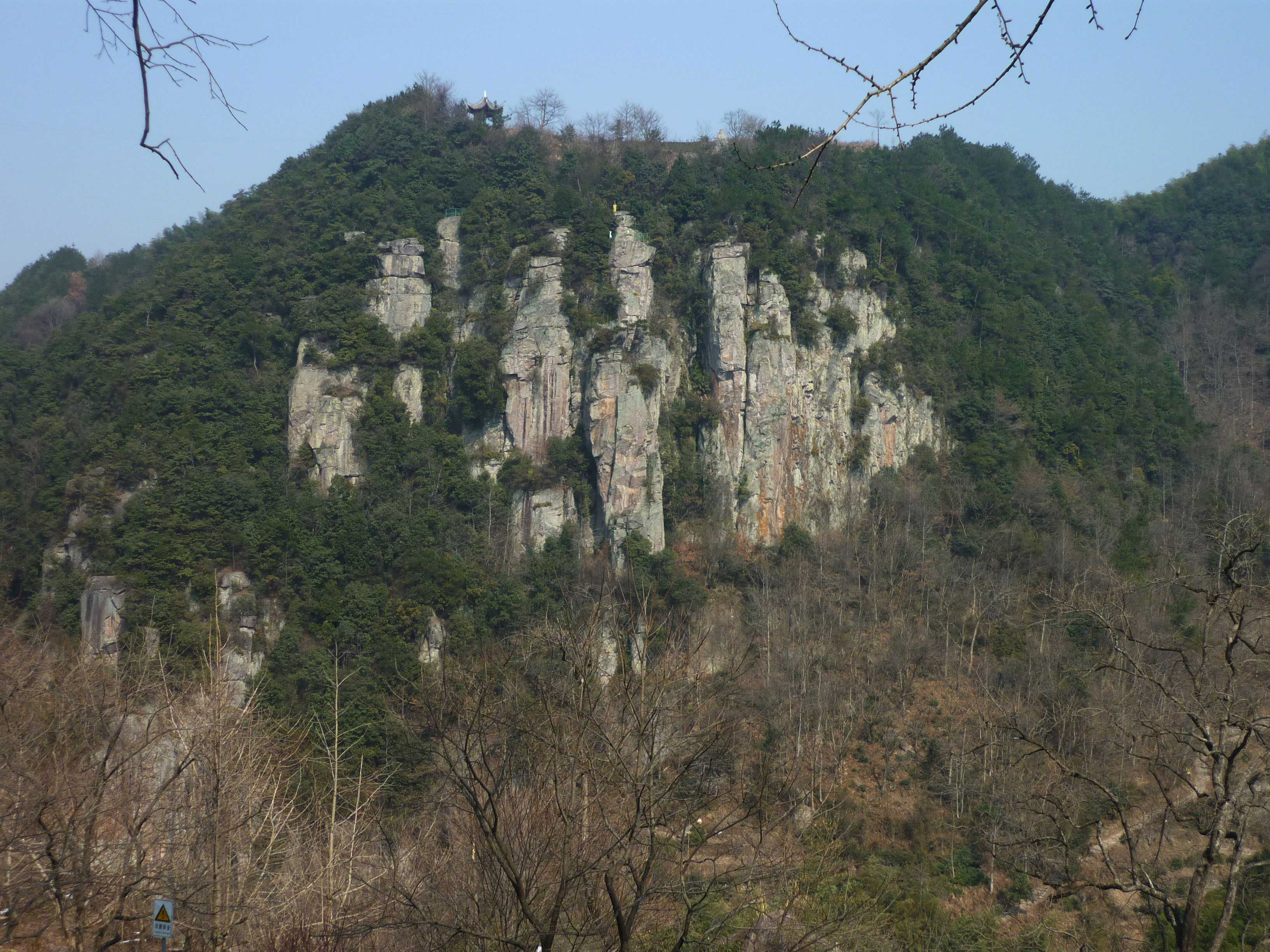
Mount Siming in Zhejiang, where Siming Zhili resided.

The usage of the Dabei zhou for repentance was finally formally codified into a ritual structure via the composition of the Dabei Chan by the eminent monk and Twenty-Eighth Patriarch of the Chinese Tiantai tradition, Siming Zhili (四明知禮, 960–1028). Zhili is regarded by Chinese Buddhist tradition as an incarnation of Śākyamuni Buddha's son, Rāhula, due to an event detailed in some records relating to his birth where his mother only became pregnant with him after his father prayed to the Buddha for an heir and, in response, received a dream where an Indian monk presented him with a son while saying, “This is Lo-hou-lo [Rahula], the son of the Buddha.” Zhili was a great devotee of Tiantai rites of penitence, having been known to practice a wide range of repentance rituals many times during his lifetime, in some cases performing them continuously over multiple years. He was also known for composing various other repentance rites besides the Dabei Chan, such as the Jinguangming Zuisheng Chanyi (金光明最勝懺儀, lit: "Most Victorious Golden Light Repentance Rite") which was based on the Golden Light Sūtra and is also still performed in contemporary Chinese Buddhist practice. His decision to base the Dabei Chan on an esoteric sūtra may have been influenced by the influx of new translations of tantric scriptures such as the Kāraṇḍavyūha Sūtra by the monk Tianxizai (天息災) under the sponsorship of the Song court at the time. The version of the sūtra he used was the translation by Bhagavaddharma.

The ritual manual penned by Zhili's for the Dabei Chan was titled the Qianshouyan Dabeixin Zhou Xingfa (千手眼大悲心呪行法, lit: "Method of the Great Compassionate Heart Mantra of a Thousand Arms and Eyes"). According to his preface to the ritual manual, Zhili states that although he could recite the Dabei zhou by heart by the time he was a child, he did not know the method of upholding it. Later, after he began to practice Tiantai meditation, when he examined the sūtra in which the Dabei zhou was introduced, he discovered that it could help one to attain wisdom through contemplation and as well as satisfy the requirement of phenomenal ritual performance. According to his instructions, the ritual was to be carried out in twenty-one days, and structurally consists of ten sections: (1) sanctify the place of practice; (2) purify the three activities [of mouth, body and mind]; (3) establishing the ritual space; (4) make offerings; (5) invite the Triple Gem and various gods; (6) praise and prayer; (7) prostrations; (8) making vows and chanting the Dabei zhou; (9) confession and repentance; and (10) practicing discernment. The structure of the ritual programme as outlined above is highly similar to Zhiyi's earlier Fahua Sanmei Chanyi, with the main differences being section (3) "establishing the boundary" and section (8) "making vows and chanting the Dabei zhou" which replace the "circumambulation" and "chanting the Lotus Sūtra" sections of the Fahua Sanmei Chanyi respectively.

=== Yuan dynasty to Ming dynasty (13th century-17th century) ===
==== Codification in monastic rules ====
The Dabei Chan continued to be performed as part of regular monastic practice under the succeeding Yuan dynasty (1279–1368). For instance, the Zengxiu Jiaoyuan Qinggui (增修教苑清規, lit: "Revised Rules of Purity for Jiao temples"), a set of monastic codes for temples under the Jiao classification (教, encompassing various Buddhist traditions based heavily on scriptures such as Tiantai and Huayan) published in 1347 by the Tiantai monk Ziqing (自慶) specifically lists the Dabei Chan as a practice for the monastic community to perform on the 20th of the fourth month. In addition, Ziqing also drew diagrams detailing the ritual layout for repentance rites. According to the Zengxiu Jiaoyuan Qinggui, a performance of the Dabei Chan should proceed as follows: The day before the 20th of the fourth month, an attendant of the overseer or precentor (維那) informs the congregation of monks about the ritual by hanging up a plaque giving notice for the repentance rite. Monks are instructed to lay out prayer cushions, while the overseer's attendant prepares hand warmers, candlesticks, and scattered flowers, placing them on a small table before the main practitioner. On the morning of the initiation, the hall bell is rung, and the congregation stands in their positions according to the prescribed order provided in Ziqing's diagram in order of seniority. The diagram also lists the necessary and ritual implements, such as bells, clappers, wooden fish, mallets, chimes, cymbals, and drums.

==== Promotion by the imperial court ====
In the succeeding Ming dynasty (1368–1644), the Dabei zhou and its corresponding sūtra was promoted by the imperial court, who frequently held ceremonies to pray for the salvation of those who had died in wartime. For instance, the Yongle Emperor authored a preface for the sūtra titled the Yuzhi Dabei Zongchi Jingzhou Xu (御製大悲總持經咒序, lit: "Imperial Preface for the Great Compassionate Dharani Sūtra and Mantra"). This preface was later presented to the Oriental scholar Samuel Beal by the monks of Hoi Tong Monastery on Henan Island in the 19th century, who translated it into English. Part of the preface reads as follows:

It is reported by Kwan Tseu Tsai Bodhisattva, prompted by her great compassionate heart has engaged herself by a great oath to enter into every one of the innumerable worlds, and bring deliverance to all creatures who inhabit them. For this purpose she has enunciated the Divine sentences which follow, if properly recited, will render all creatures exempt from the causes of sorrow, and by removing them, render them capable of attaining Supreme Reason.

=== Qing dynasty to Present (17th century-21st century) ===
==== Variant liturgies and standardization ====
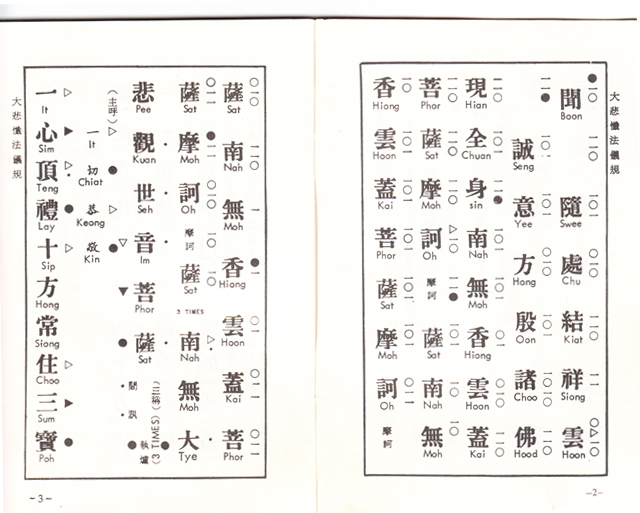
Second and third page of a modern edition of the ritual manual for the Dabei Chan. The romanized pronunciations are in Hokkien Chinese.

By the late Ming period, the practice of the Dabei Chan had become so popular and widespread that various regional liturgical variants were circulating at the same time. This was criticized by the eminent monk Ouyi Zhixu, who was a Patriarch of both the Chinese Pure Land and Tiantai traditions. The ritual liturgy would only become standardized from the early years of the succeeding Qing dynasty (1644–1912) onwards due to the efforts of the eminent monk Jianyue Duti (見月讀體, 1601–1679), who was a Vinaya specialist from Yunnan. In his youth, he was inspired to join the Buddhist monkhood after reading the Avataṃsaka Sūtra and eventually received ordination under the Vinaya master Sanmei Jiguang (三昧寂光), an eminent monk who was recognized as a national preceptor by both the Ming and Qing imperial courts and who served as the abbot of Longchang Temple on Mount Baohua, a prestigious monastic center that was famed for their Vinaya studies during the Qing dynasty. During the late Ming to early Qing dynasty period, monastic discipline was seen as being on a decline. In response, Duti promoted Vinaya studies, rectified many monastery malpractices, and, due to his strict self-discipline, was a respected Vinaya master who was seen as a reformer and revitalizer of monastic ethics and precepts. Duti would eventually succeed Jiguang as the abbot of Longchang Temple. Around 1645 to 1665, Duti compiled a revised and abridged version of the ritual liturgical text for the Dabei Chan titled the Dabei Chanyi (大悲懺儀, lit: "Great Compassion Repentance Ritual"). Because of his reputation for virtuous conduct, his version was quickly accepted and became the standard version used in Qing dynasty temples. In 1819, the monk Juche Jixian (巨徹寂暹) consulted various other liturgical variants and re-edited Duti's version of the text. This version of the text condenses Zhili's original composition (which had ten sections) to five sections: (1) make offerings; (2) praise and prayer; (3) prostrations; (4) making vows and chanting the Dabei zhou; (5) confession and repentance. The liturgical text would receive some more minor additional modifications in later periods, including an expansion of section (3) "prostrations" to include making prostrations to Śrāvakas and Zhili (in addition to the Buddhas and Bodhisattvas that were already present in the text), as well as more prostrations to the Triple Gem on behalf of devas and worldly spirits such as the Four Heavenly Kings and the Eight Legions of Devas and Nāgas. This would be the last revision of the ritual liturgy, which is still used in all modern contemporary performances of the ritual throughout China, Taiwan, Singapore, Malaysia and other overseas Chinese communities.

== Ritual Outline ==
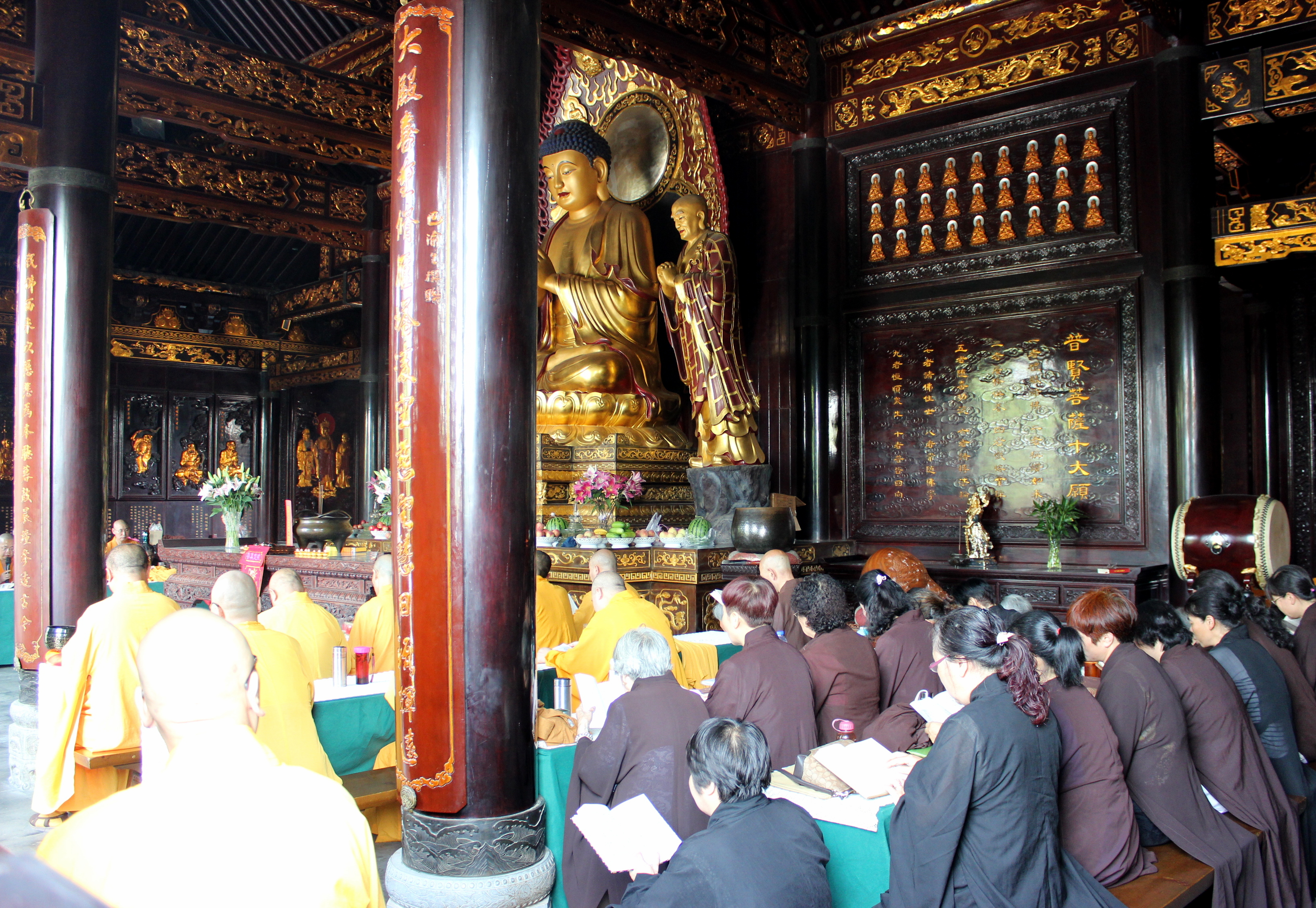
Monks and laypeople inside Daci'en Temple in Xi'an, China. In contemporary practice, the Dabei Chan is typically performed in a similar setting inside a hall in the temple, with monastics leading at the front while laypeople participate behind them.

According to Zhili's instructions, the ritual should be performed before an image of Qianshou Qianyan Guanyin (which has a thousand arms and eyes) that faces the east. If an image of Qianshou Qianyan Guanyin isn't available, then a six-armed, four-armed or any Guanyin figure will also be acceptable as a substitute. If no Guanyin images are available, then either an image of Śākyamuni Buddha or Mahāsthāmaprapta can be used instead.

In contemporary practice, the ritual is typically led by a monastic who takes on the role of the lead cantor, known as the weina (維那), who gives instructions throughout the ritual and delivers some of the prose sections in the liturgy through a style of Chinese Buddhist chanting called fanbai. The entire ritual is typically structurally divided into five main sections:

1. Making offerings (修供養)
2. Offering sincere praises (讚歎伸誠)
3. Making postrations (作禮)
4. Making vows and upholding the mantra (發願持咒)
5. Confession and repentance (懺悔)

=== Making offerings ===
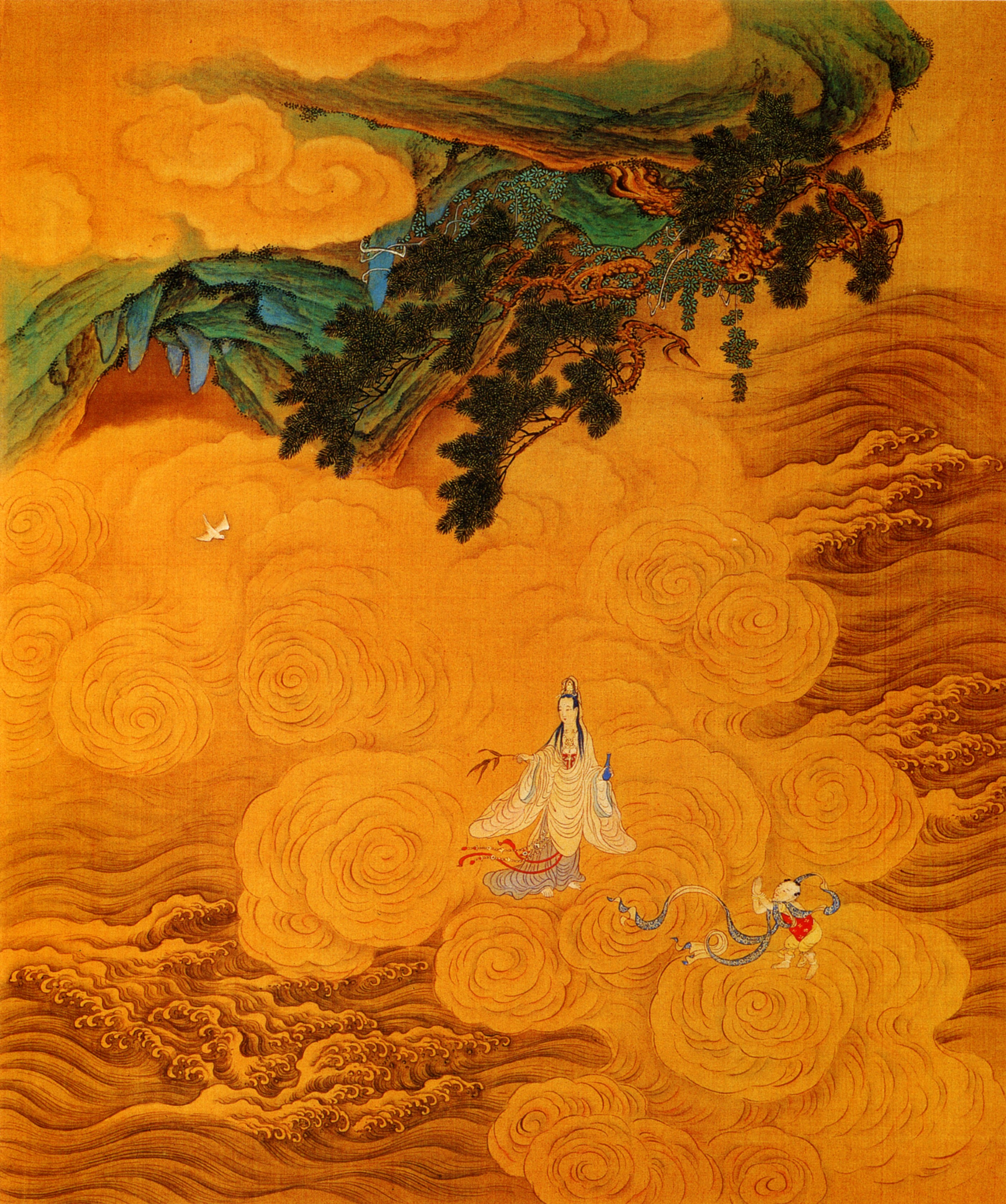
Qing dynasty (1644–1912) painting of Guanyin at Chaoyin Cave (潮音洞, lit: "Tidal Sound Cave") on Mount Putuo. She is waving a willow branch to sprinkle water from her vase to reduce the suffering of people, while the acolyte Shancai stands with his hands clasped in reverence. Held at the National Palace Museum, Taipei, Taiwan.

This section begins with a recitation of a hymn by participants called the Yangzhi jingshui zan (楊枝淨水讚, lit: "Praise of the Willow Branch and Pure Water"):

楊枝淨水，
遍灑三千。
性空八德利人天，
福壽廣增延。
滅罪消愆，
火焰化紅蓮。

Translation:

Willow branch and pure water,
Sprinkling across the three thousand realms.
Benefiting humans and devas with its nature of Emptiness and Eight Virtues,
Broadly bestowing fortune and extending longevity.
Extinguishing sins and absolving transgression,
A blazing fire blooms into a crimson lotus.

The willow branch and vase of pure water are common iconographic traits associated with Guanyin. They originated from various Esoteric Buddhist scriptures, where they were used to perform ritual functions such as healing, exorcising ghosts, and dispelling evil spirits. Eminent Buddhist figures such as the Tiantai masters Zhiyi and Zunshi later wrote commentaries explaining their symbolic significance and included them in ritual manuals of practices centered around Guanyin, which solidified the link between them and Guanyin in the religious consciousness of Chinese Buddhism.

The participants then chants "Namo Dabei Guanshiyin Pusa" (南無大悲觀世音菩薩), meaning "I take refuge in Guanshiyin Bodhisattva of Great Compassion", up to three times. The participants then sincerely make one full prostration to the constantly abiding Triple Gems of the ten directions before kneeling down and holding up an offering plate filled with flowers, incense and rice to make the offering. During this time, the participants chant verses expressing their wish that the fragrant flowers will decorate all immeasurable sacred Buddha Lands in the ten directions, and that they will accomplish the Bodhisattva path to the complete level of a Tathāgata. The weina delivers a short prose section describing the participants' bodies pervading unobstructed throughout the ten directions and making offerings before the Triple Gem in all ten directions, as well as praying that the fragrance of the offerings reaches all sentient beings in the Dharmadhātu and that, having received the fragrance, they give rise to bodhicitta.

=== Offering sincere praises ===
The participants then rise and chant verses in praise of Guanyin:

南無過去正法明如來，現前觀世音菩薩！
成妙功德，具大慈悲，
於一身心，現千手眼，
照見法界，護持眾生，
令發廣大道心，教持圓滿神咒，
永離惡道，得生佛前，
無間重愆，纏身惡疾，
莫能救濟，悉使消除，
三昧辯才，現生求願，
皆令果遂，決定無疑，
能使速獲三乘，早登佛地，
威神之力，歎莫能窮，
故我一心歸命頂禮。

Translation:

I take refuge in Zhengfaming Tathāgata of the past, who is Guanshiyin Bodhisattva of the present!
Accomplished in wondrous merits, great in compassion.
With one body and mind, manifesting a thousand arms and eyes,
Illuminating the Dharmadhātu, protecting sentient beings.
Leading all to attain the vast mind of the Way, teaching all to uphold the divine spell of perfect completion,
And so causing all to leave the evil paths forever, attaining rebirth before the Buddha.
Limitless grave transgressions, malignant plagues that blight one's body,
Even without hope of salvation, You cause them all to be extinguished.
Samadhi, eloquence and the wishes in this life,
All will be granted, without any doubt.
Able to lead all to swiftly attain the Three Vehicles and ascend to Buddhahood,
Your majestic powers can never be exhausted.
Thus, with one mind, do I take refuge and prostrate before You.

=== Making prostrations ===
In this section, participants make a series of prostrations to enlightened Buddhist figures. The list includes: Śākyamuni Buddha (釋迦牟尼世尊), Amitābha Buddha (阿彌陀世尊), Qianguang Wang Jingzhu Buddha (千光王靜住世尊), all Buddhas of the past who number as many as ninety-nine kotis of sand in the Ganges River, Zhengfaming Buddha (正法明世尊), all Buddhas of the ten directions, the thousand Buddhas of the worthy kalpa and all Buddhas of the three periods, the Dabei zhou, all dhāraṇīs of Guanyin as well as all dharmas that exist throughout the ten directions and three periods, Qianshou Qianyan Guanyin (千手千眼大慈大悲觀世音自在菩薩), Mahāsthāmaprāpta (大勢至菩薩), Dharaniraja Bodhisattva (總持王菩薩), Sūryaprabha (日光菩薩), Candraprabha (月光菩薩), Ratnaraja Bodhisattva (寶王菩薩), Bhaiṣajyarāja (藥王菩薩), Bhaiṣajyasamudgata (藥上菩薩), Avataṃsaka Bodhisattva (華嚴菩薩), Mahāvyūha Bodhisattva (大莊嚴菩薩), Ratnagarbha Bodhisattva (寶藏菩薩), Guṇagarbha Bodhisattva (德藏菩薩), Vajragarbha Bodhisattva (金剛藏菩薩), Ākāśagarbha (虛空藏菩薩), Maitreya (彌勒菩薩) Samantabhadra (普賢菩薩), Mañjuśrī (文殊師利), all Bodhisattva Mahāsattvas of the ten directions and three periods, Mahākāśyapa (摩訶迦葉), the innumerable Śrāvakas and Siming Zhili. This is followed by more prostrations to the Triple Gem on behalf of devas and worldly spirits such as the Four Heavenly Kings and the Eight Legions of Devas and Nāgas.

=== Making vows and upholding the mantra ===
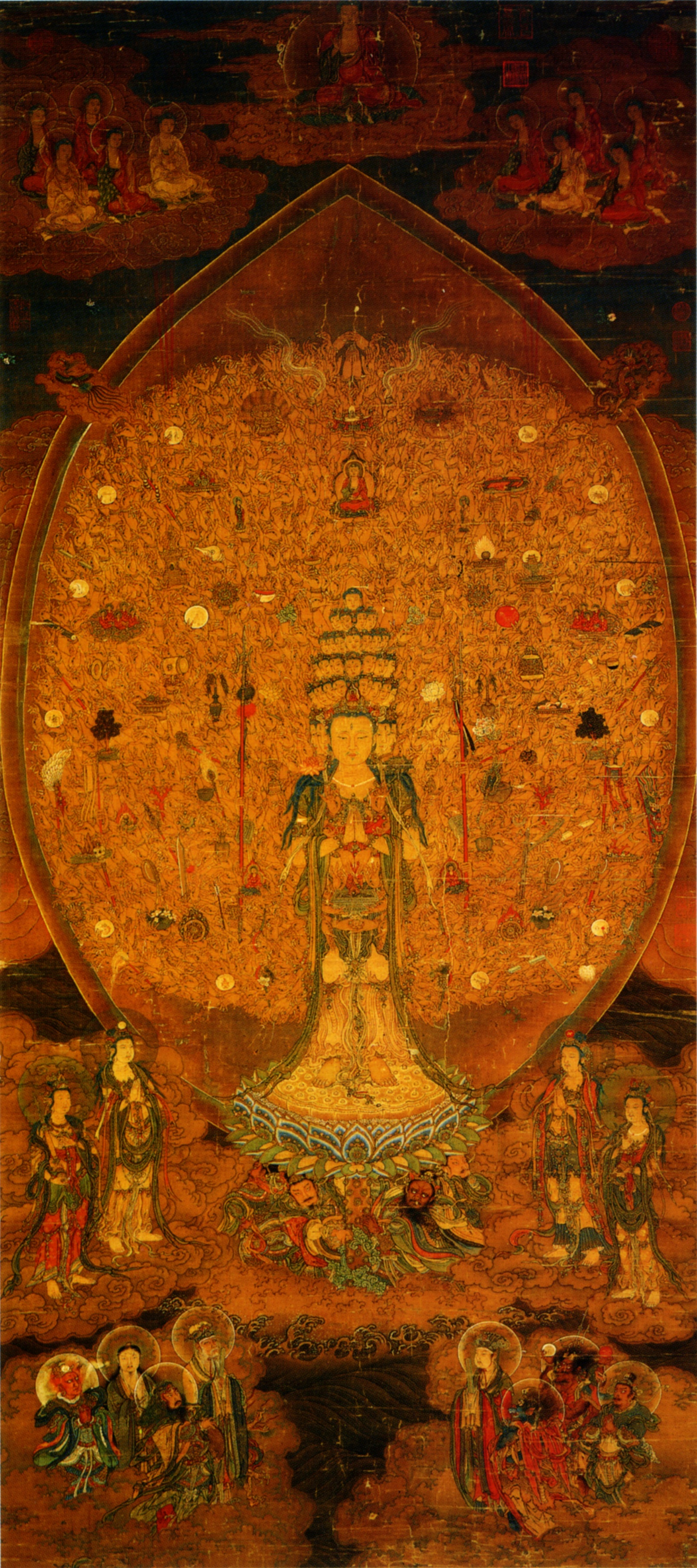
Song dynasty (960–1279) painting of Qianshou Qianyan Guanyin. 12th century. Guanyin is depicted with twenty-six bodhisattva heads and one Buddha head at the top. She stands on a pedestal held up by the Four Heavenly Kings, with two bodhisattva attendants flanking on each side and the Eight Legions of Devas and Nāgas standing in front of the central figure of Guanyin in reverence. Above Guanyin, several Buddhas sit on clouds, looking down below.

The weina then leads the participants in a recitation of the first ten vows made by Guanyin in the sūtra the which introduced the Dabei zhou, with the participants chanting one instance of "Namo Dabei Guanshiyin Pusa" between each vow:

1. I vow to swiftly learn all dharmas.
2. I vow to swiftly attain the eye of wisdom.
3. I vow to swiftly liberate all sentient being.
4. I vow to swiftly attain good upaya.
5. I vow to swiftly board the boat of prajñā.
6. I vow to swiftly cross over the sea of suffering.
7. I vow to swiftly attain precepts, samadhi and the Way.
8. I vow to swiftly climb the mountain of Nirvana.
9. I vow to swiftly abide in the abode of the unconditioned.
10. I vow to swiftly become one with the dharma-nature body.

After this, participants recite the last six vows Guanyin made in the sūtra in succession without chanting "Namo Dabei Guanshiyin Pusa" in between:

1. If I were to approach a mountain of blades, the mountain of blades will collapse and break by itself.
2. If I were to approach a pool of fire, the fiery pool will dry up by itself.
3. If I were to approach hell, hell will extinguish itself.
4. If I were to approach hungry ghosts, the hungry ghosts will become full by themselves.
5. If I were to approach asuras, their evil hearts will become subdued by themselves.
6. If I were to approach animals, they will attain great wisdom by themselves.

Next, the participants chant "Namo Guanshiyin Pusa" and "Namo Amituofo" ten times each. The participants then begin to recite the short introduction to the Dabei zhou in the sūtra where Guanyin makes several vows to not attain Buddhahood if beings who recite the Dabei zhou fall into the three lower realms of rebirth, are not born into Buddha lands or do not obtain unlimited samadhi and eloquence. The participants then start reciting the Dabei zhou. up a total of twenty-one times or fourteen times in succession. At the end of the recitation of the Dabei zhou, a short closing section from the sūtra describing the dharani shaking the earth, making heavenly rain and precious flowers fall, delighting the Buddhas of the ten directions, frightening heretics and evil-doers and inducing the audience to attain different levels of enlightenment is recited.

=== Repentance ===
In this section, the participants perform more prostrations and chant a short verse vowing to cut off the three obstructions and reform their behaviour for the sake of all sentient beings. The liturgy also includes a subsection allowing participants to reflect on the negative karma that they have accumulated since time immemorial while vowing to believe sincerely in cause and effect, repent of any wrongdoing or transgression and commit oneself to doing only wholesome deeds and dedicate oneself towards the liberation of all sentient beings from samsara. After this, the repentance is concluded with the recitation of a repentance text affirming the Buddhist teachings regarding the buddha-nature inherent in all beings in the Dharmadhātu, listing the various means by which one has committed grave transgressions in either this life or past lives, affirming the power of the Dabei zhou in eliminating the obstacles caused by such unskillful actions, confessing and repenting for all of one's offenses, affirming Guanyin's spiritual support in aiding one on the path to enlightenment, vowing to seek rebirth in Amitābha's Pure Land of Sukhāvatī as well as to commit oneself to be complete in all dharanis and liberate all sentient beings in samsara.

Next, the assembly reaffirms their refuge in the Buddhas of the ten directions, the Dharma of the ten directions, the Sangha of the ten directions, Śākyamuni, Amitābha, Qianguang Wang Jingzhu Buddha, the Dabei zhou, Qianshou Qianyan Guanyin, Mahāsthāmaprāpta and Dharaniraja Bodhisattva. After this, the assembly reiterates their refuge in the Triple Gem once again along with additional vows regarding the salvation of sentient beings in samsara. The assembly then chants "Namo Dabei Guanshiyin Pusa" three more times. The ritual then closes with the dedication of merits from the performance of the ritual to all sentient beings.

== Ritual manual ==
Full digitalized texts of the ritual manual

Ritual manual published in 1937 by the World Buddhist Lay Association, which has since changed its name to the Shanghai Buddhist Lay Association in contemporary times.

Qing dynasty (1644–1912) era ritual manual, written with gold ink and featuring illustrations.

== See also ==
- Guanyin, the central figure in the rite
- Nīlakaṇṭha Dhāraṇī, the main mantra which the rite utilizes
- Fanbai, style of Chinese Buddhist chanting which is typically used to perform the rite
- Shuilu Fahui, extensive Chinese Buddhist ceremony where the Dabei Chan is sometimes performed
- Yaoshi Bao Chan, a repentance ritual that is dedicated to Bhaisajyaguru
- Yujia Yankou
- Chinese Buddhist liturgy
- Suryukjae
- Monlam Prayer Festival
- Shuni-e
