= Fanbai =

Chinese Buddhist style of ritual chanting

Fanbai (Chinese: 梵唄, pinyin: fánbài; lit. 'Voice of Brahmā') refers to Buddhist ritual chanting performed in Chinese Buddhism. It originated from the chanting style that was commonly used in Indian Buddhism to facilitate the recitation of scriptures, which was later adapted in Chinese Buddhism after the transmission of Buddhism from India to China. In China, various styles of fanbai, each with specific melodies and rhythms, were gradually developed by various Buddhist traditions and regions. Despite these variations, the term "fanbai" is used as a broad umbrella term for Buddhist chanting from all the various traditions of Chinese Buddhism, such as Chan, Pure Land, Tiantai, Huayan and Zhenyan. Since its introduction into China, fanbai has been transmitted continuously through an unbroken lineage of monastics down to contemporary times, and is still used in modern Chinese Buddhist practice during all rituals and ceremonies.

== Etymology ==
The word "bai" (唄) is an abbreviation of the word "baini" (唄匿), which derives from the Sanskrit words पाठ (pāṭha) or पाठक (pāṭhaka). "Bai" corresponds to the syllable "pā", and "ni" (Old Chinese: nrik or thok) corresponds to the syllable "ṭhaka". The original meaning of the word is "chanting", sometimes accompanied by music to enhance the rhythm and memorability, making scripture recitation easier.

The word "fan", phonetically translated in full as "Fanlanmo" (梵覽摩, lit: "Brahmā"), is often used to refer to things from the Indian region, and can also mean pure and undefiled. Therefore, the term "Fanbai" can be interpreted as "Indian-style chanting" or "pure chanting".

== Overview ==
Fanbai is typically utilized in several different ritual contexts. One example is during the exposition or teaching of sutras, where fanbai is usually performed before and after the main lecture. Another example is during daily morning and evening liturgical services where dhāraṇīs, gāthā and sūtras are performed via fanbai. Fanbai is also typically a main component of regular ceremonial services such as the Yujia Yankou ritual, the Shuilu Fahui ceremony and various repentance rites such as the Dabei Chan.

The Dīrgha Āgama provides a list of five characteristics that fanbai must possess:

1. Its sound is upright.
2. Its sound is harmonious and elegant.
3. Its sound is clear and penetrating.
4. Its sound is deep and full.
5. It is heard everywhere, far and wide.

In general, liturgical books do not provide detailed melodic notation. Instead, the specific melodies and notes are traditionally only transmitted orally from generation to generation, with students learning by listening to the chants as they are performed. Regional variations in melodies and tunes can be found in Han Chinese and Tibetan regions.

Due to the precarious nature of oral transmissions where breaks or interruptions may cause tunes to become vulnerable to being lost, the Chinese Buddhist Association has, in recent years, supported a massive project of collecting and recording traditional fanbai melodies that were traditionally only transmitted orally. This work, which was undertaken under the direction of the Buddhist and musicologist Tian Qing (⽥青), elaborated models and publicized tunes with the result of releasing standardised versions.

== History ==
When Buddhism first spread to China, monks from India focused mainly on translating scriptures, with little transmission of Buddhist chanting. According to volume 13 of the Biographies of Eminent Monks, "Since the great teaching flowed east, there have been many translators, but transmitters of the sound are few. This is truly because Sanskrit sounds are complex and repetitive, while Chinese is monosyllabic and singular. If one uses Sanskrit sounds to chant Chinese, the sounds become numerous and the verses cramped; if one uses Chinese to chant Sanskrit, the rhymes become short and the lines long. Therefore, the golden words have translation, but the Sanskrit sounds have no transmission."

Traditional accounts attribute the origin of fanbai in China to Cao Zhi, Prince Si of Wei during the Three Kingdoms period. One day, while visiting Yushan (魚山, lit: "Fish Mountain") in Dong'e, Shandong, he suddenly heard Brahmā music, chanting and praises filling the air. Cao Zhi, feeling inspired, returned to his residence and imitated the melody, composing the first piece of fanbai in China.

During the Southern and Northern dynasties (420–589) period, Buddhism flourished in the south. Xiao Ziliang, also known as Prince Wenxuan of Jinling, gathered monks skilled in music and tone from the capital in 489 CE in order to conduct research and create Buddhist chant and praises. Their efforts culminated in the "Southern fanbai" style, which is characterized primarily by its sorrowful elegance. By the time of Emperor Wu of Liang, the Emperor utilized the opportunity of standardizing the ceremonial music of the Liang court to extensively introduce Brahmā music and fuse it with traditional Chinese music from the Shang and Zhou dynasties onwards, further facilitating the sinicization of Buddhist chanting. Subsequently, fanbai naturally became part of yayue (court ceremonial music). In the 6th century AD, the Chinese Southern Dynasty monk Huijiao, in his work "Biographies of Eminent Monks", recorded: "The songs from the East are composed of rhymes to form hymns; praises from the West are composed of gāthās to form harmonious melody. Although songs and praises differ, both harmonize with bells and pitch-pipes, conforming to the pentatonic scale, only then becoming profound and subtle. Therefore, playing songs with metal and stone [instruments] is called music; setting praises with wind and string [instruments] is called chanting." This indicates that before the 6th century, "chanting" was already popular within Chinese Buddhist monasteries. Due to the court's attention and promotion, it became popular not only in monasteries but also among the common people. During the Tang dynasty (618–907), eminent Japanese monks such as Kōbō Daishi and Dengyō Daishi who came to China to study Buddhism brought back fanbai chanting styles they had learnt to Japan, where they eventually developed into the shōmyō chanting style used in Japanese Buddhism.

During the Song (960–1279), Chan Buddhist monasteries became major Buddhist institutions in particular, and their monastic regulations ensured the perpetuation of fundamental rituals, which included fanbai. The Zhenyan, Tiantai and Pure Land traditions were also particularly influential in shaping the styles of fanbai. During this period, a large number of monastic liturgies were composed, with many of them still being practiced in contemporary times using fanbai, such as the Dabei Chan (大悲懺, "Great Compassion Repentance"). After the Song (960–1279) and Yuan (1271–1368) dynasties, fanbai and Buddhist music had already undergone a clear differentiation and were moving comprehensively towards popularization. This influenced the development of contemporary secular music, such as various cipai (the name of the tune to which a ci poem is composed) and qupai (fixed melody used in traditional Chinese instrumental or vocal music) compositions of the time. A few examples from that time include the cipai titled "Pusa man" (菩薩蠻, lit: "Bodhisattva barbarian"), the qupai "Shuangdiao wu gongyang" (雙調五供養, lit: "Double-toned Five Offerings") as well as the "Pu'an zhou" (普庵咒, lit: "Mantra of Pu'an"), which is a piece in the repertoire of the seven-string guqin. By the Ming (1368–1644) and Qing (1644–1912) dynasties, the popularization of Buddhist music and the mutual absorption of secular music had become even more developed. For instance, in the 15th year of the Yongle era (1417), Emperor Yongle of Ming promulgated the imperially commissioned "Songs of the Names of the Buddhas, World-Honored Ones, Tathāgatas, Bodhisattvas, and Venerable Ones" (諸佛世尊如來菩薩尊者名稱歌曲) in fifty volumes, ordering all monks in the country to learn and sing them. This collection included a large number of northern and southern folk songs that were popular at the time. During the late-Ming to early Qing-dynasty period, the eminent monk Yinyuan Longqi transmitted the Ming dynasty style of fanbai to Japan, where it remains the style of chanting used in the Ōbaku Zen tradition of Buddhism he founded.

Fanbai has continued to be transmitted from the Qing dynasty through to the modern contemporary period, with all rituals and ceremonies in modern Chinese Buddhist practice being conducted through the use of fanbai to perform the respective liturgies. In addition, new styles and compositions have also continued to be created. A popular modern example of a tune that has been publicized is the Ten Recitations Method (十唸法) taught by Venerable Yinguang, the Thirteenth Patriarch of the Chinese Pure Land tradition, to chant the nianfo. In addition, Venerable Yinguang also personally composed several fanbai pieces, such as "Circumambulation Tune" (繞佛調).

== Transmissions ==
=== Northern Transmission ===
Chanting works produced before the Tang Dynasty include "Rulai bai" (如來唄, lit: "Tathāgata Chant"), "Yunhe bai" (云何唄, lit: "How Chant"), "Chushi bai" (處世唄, lit: "Abiding in the World Chant"), and "Zan Fo Ji" (讚佛偈, lit: "Gatha in Praise of the Buddha"). The lyrics are all derived from Buddhist scriptures.

In contemporary China, fanbai has developed various regional stylistic schools, such as the Shangjiang-style of fanbai (上江腔梵唄) in the southwest, which is still preserved at Wenshu Temple in Chengdu and Huayan Temple in Chongqing. In Taiwan, the styles of fanbai can mainly be divided into two types: "Gushan style" (鼓山調, lit: "Mount Gu") and "Haichaoyin style" (海潮音, lit: "Sound of ocean waves").

Most early monks who went to Taiwan came from Yongquan Temple on Mount Gu in Fujian, China, so the tune they chanted was called "Gushan style". "Haichaoyin style" was brought to Taiwan after 1949 by monks from Zhejiang and Jiangsu provinces in mainland China. Generally, the "Gushan style" is faster-paced with more ornamentation around the core notes, while "Haichaoyin" is more slow and relaxed and steady, with a simpler melody.

== See also ==
- Buddhist music
- Chinese Buddhist liturgy, which is performed through fanbai
- Yujia Yankou, a ritual where fanbai is utilized to perform the liturgy
- Shuilu Fahui, another ceremony where fanbai is performed
- Dabei Chan, a repentance rite where fanbai is performed
- Yaoshi Bao Chan, another repentance rite where fanbai is performed
- Shōmyō, Japanese style of Buddhist chants similar to fanbai
- Beompae, Korean style of Buddhist chants similar to fanbai
