= Buddhist legends about Emperor Wu of Liang =

During the reign of Emperor Wu (r. 502–549) of the Liang dynasty, he embraced and promoted Buddhism. Several times, he became a Buddhist monk and forced his court to buy him back with substantial offerings to the sangha. In 517, he ordered the destruction of Taoist temples and forced Taoist priests to return to lay life. Some of his other reforms, such as the disallowance of capital punishment and of animal sacrifices during ancestral ceremonies, conformed with his Buddhist convictions.

Because of his constant support for Buddhism, Emperor Wu came to be viewed as the Chinese counterpart of Ashoka, the great Indian chakravartin and patron of the religion. Later writers who saw Emperor Wu's reign as a golden age of Chinese Buddhism compiled stories about the emperor's role in creating or sponsoring important Buddhist institutions or rituals. A cycle of stories developed around Baozhi, the emperor's favorite monk, and around Bodhidharma, the first patriarch of Chan Buddhism, who was alleged to have met the emperor in the 520s.

== The emperor's encounter with Bodhidharma ==
According to Buddhist tradition, Bodhidharma, the first Chan/Zen patriarch of China, came to visit Emperor Wu around 520. The emperor told Bodhidharma that he had built temples and given financial support to the monastic community, and asked the patriarch how much merit he had gained for these actions. Bodhidharma replied, "None whatsoever." Perplexed, the emperor then asked the eminent monk who he was to tell him such things, to which he answered, "I know not." Bodhidharma then left the imperial court to continue his travels throughout China. This account of their legendary encounter typifies Zen's uncompromising teaching methods. The dialogue appears in the first case of the Blue Cliff Record. Imperial officials disapproved of the dialogue, viewing it as contrary to the dignity of the throne.

The encounter between Emperor Wu and Bodhidharma was first recorded around 758 in the appendix to a text by Shen-hui (神會), a disciple of Huineng.

== The Liberation Rite of Water and Land ==
Emperor Wu is also considered as one of the creators of the Shuilu Fahui ceremony, a grand and costly ritual that was supposed to last for an entire week and was designed both to save the spirits of the dead and to improve the condition of the living. This rite probably originated in the tenth century, but an account by monk Zhipan from the thirteenth century gives Emperor Wu a role in its creation. According to this account, the emperor had a dream in which a benevolent monk advised him to free the spirits of the dead from their sufferings. So the emperor called on Chan Buddhism Master Baozhi to organize such a ceremony. Baozhi allegedly spent three years to compile the necessary texts for this ritual.

== Repentance Ritual of the Emperor of Liang ==
The emperor is probably best known for being one of the co-authors of a major scripture in Chinese Buddhism. A major Buddhist repentance service is named after the emperor. Titled the Emperor of Liang Jeweled Repentance (梁皇寶懺), the repentance records and details the reasons behind his wife's transformation, examples of people affected by karma, stories about people receiving retribution, and what one can do to prevent it. The repentance also involves prostrations to a number of Buddhas.

Historically, Emperor Wu initiated this ceremony approximately 1500 years ago. His wife, Chi Hui, died aged thirty after leading a life marked by jealousy and anger. After her death, she turned into a giant snake and purgatory . She came to recognize that she needed prayers from the sangha to expiate her sins and release her from the lower realms. Through great generosity, Emperor Wu requested Chan Master Baozhi and other high monastics to write ten chapters of the repentance. As a result of performing this ceremony, his wife was indeed released from its suffering.

It is a popular text amongst many Chinese Buddhists, the text itself is recited and performed annually in many temples, usually during the Qingming Festival, the Zhongyuan Festival or performances of the Shuilu Fahui ceremony.

A complete English translation of this text was done by the Buddhist Text Translation Society in 2016. The title is "Repentance Ritual of the Emperor of Liang: A complete translation of Repentance Dharma of Kindness and Compassion in the Bodhimanda."

== Emperor Wu's "order" of the Execution of the Kowtow Monk ==
Emperor Wu was also fond of playing weiqi, an ancient board game. There was a famous and knowledgeable monk who was nicknamed the "Kowtow Monk", whom the Emperor respected highly and summoned him often to chat with him.

One day, the Kowtow Monk paid a visit to the palace when the Emperor was playing Go with an official. The Emperor surrounded a big group of stones on the board and was so excited that he yelled, "Kill!" All of a sudden, guards rushed into the palace, seized the Kowtow Monk and executed him outside the palace gate.

The Emperor was so absorbed in the game that he didn't even know what had transpired. After the game, he remembered the monk and summoned him. The Emperor's guards reported to him that the monk was executed per his order, and the Emperor regretted deeply. On the other hand, the Kowtow Monk didn't know why he was executed, and thought that it was the judgement for killing an earthworm when he was young.
