= Kṣitigarbha Bodhisattva Pūrvapraṇidhāna Sūtra =

Sutra in Mahāyāna Buddhism

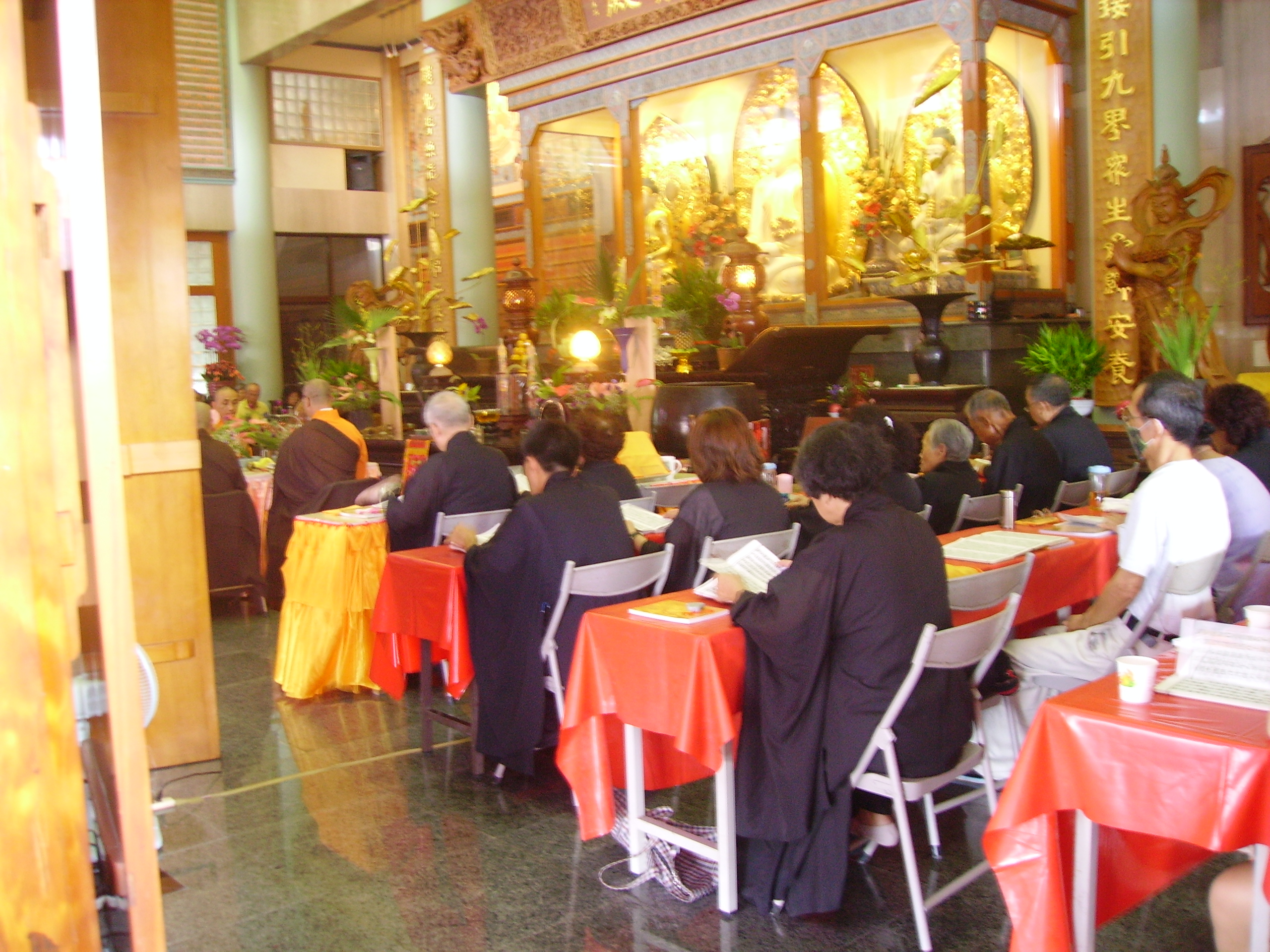
Chinese Buddhist bhikkhus and laypersons in Taiwan reciting the Kṣitigarbha Bodhisattva Pūrvapraṇidhāna Sūtra

The Kṣitigarbha Bodhisattva Pūrvapraṇidhāna Sūtra (Sanskrit, Sutra of the Fundamental Vows of the Bodhisattva Kṣitigarbha; Chinese: 地藏菩薩本願經) or Kṣitigarbhasūtra is a Mahāyāna sūtra teaching about the Bodhisattva Kṣitigarbha and is one of the more popular sūtras in Chinese Buddhism. The sutra tells of how Kṣitigarbha became a Bodhisattva by making great vows to rescue other sentient beings and a description of how he displayed filial piety in his past lifetimes. The sutra also expounds at length the retributions of unwholesome karma, descriptions of Buddhist hells and the benefits of good merit both great and small.

== History ==
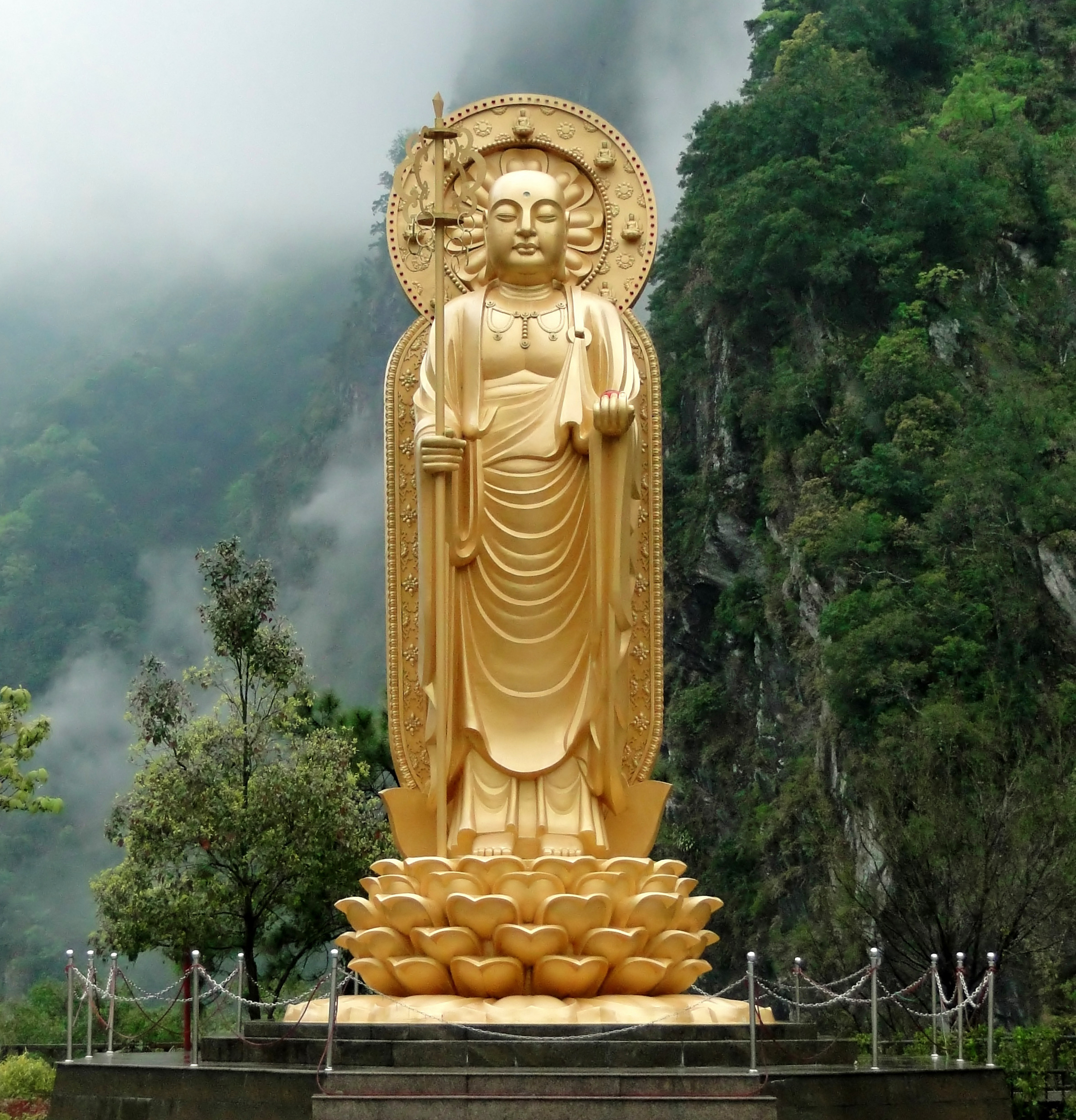
Statue of Kṣitigarbha in Taiwan

The Kṣitigarbhasūtra was first translated from Sanskrit into Chinese in the 7th century during the Tang dynasty by the Tripiṭaka master Śikṣānanda, a monk from Khotan who also provided a new translation of the Avataṃsaka Sūtra and the Laṅkāvatāra Sūtra. (Buswell & Lopez 2013, p. 448)

Some scholars suspected that instead of being translated, this text may have originated in China since no Sanskrit manuscripts of this text have been found.(Buswell 1990, p. 178) Part of the reason for suspicion is that the text advocates filial piety, which is commonly associated with Confucianism in Chinese culture. Since then, other scholars such as Gregory Schopen have countered that Indian Buddhism also had traditions of filial piety. (Schopen 1984) One example is the Buddha's sharing of the Dharma in the form of Abhidhamma with his late mother who was reborn as a celestial being in the abode of Tavatimsa, which was the greatest gift that he could offer out of filial piety to his late mother.

== Contents ==
There are a total of thirteen chapters in the Kṣitigarbhasūtra, which are divided into three sections. The teaching is presented in the form of a dialogue between the Buddha and Kṣitigarbha and takes place in the Trāyastriṃśa Heaven, located on the top of Mount Meru, in front of a vast multitude of sentient beings. It includes tales of Kṣitigarbha's skill at freeing beings from the hells and instructions on dealing with the dying and the dead. (Buswell & Lopez 2013, pp. 448–9)

This sutra has multiple aspects for Buddhists who are in various condition. For example,

1. A dharma to 'leave the sea of suffering and realize the happiness of Nirvana' and finally 'Ultimate attainment of Buddhahood'.
2. A teaching concerning karmic retribution, graphically describing the consequences one creates for oneself by committing undesirable actions.
3. filial piety – not only that between oneself and one's parents, but also in an ultimate sense of a universal code of duty or responsibility for all living beings. For example, the Buddha frequently mentions the benefits of dedicating any good merit done to all sentient beings: "Moreover, if they should be able to dedicate rewards thus gained for the benefit of the entire Dharmadhatu, then their bliss will defy comparison."

In the last Chapter 13, Buddha also spoke about 28 kinds of benefits for "any good man or good woman who should see Ksitigarbha's image and hear this Sutra and, furthermore, read and recite it, and who should also donate incense, flowers, drink, food, clothing and precious treasures as offerings, in addition to giving praise and making obeisance to Bodhisattva Ksitigarbha".

Those 28 benefits of reciting Kṣitigarbhasūtra are as follows:

1. 一者、天龍護念 They will be protected by heavenly beings and dragons.
2. 二者、善果日增 They will increase in good mind day after day.
3. 三者、集聖上因 They will accumulate superior wisdom.
4. 四者、菩提不退 They will never regress from Bodhi.
5. 五者、衣食豐足 They will be opulent in food and clothing.
6. 六者、疾疫不臨 They will never suffer from any disease.
7. 七者、離水火災 They will be far away from flood, fire and disaster.
8. 八者、無盜賊厄 They will not be stolen from or robbed.
9. 九者、人見欽敬 They will be respected by everyone.
10. 十者、神鬼助持 Gods and ghosts will help and support them.
11. 十一者、女轉男身 A woman may be reborn as a male in the next life.
12. 十二者、為王臣女 A woman may be born as a king's or minister's daughter.
13. 十三者、端正相好 They will be born with good-looking features.
14. 十四者、多生天上 They will be reincarnated in heaven.
15. 十五者、或為帝王 They may be reincarnated as a king.
16. 十六者、宿智命通 They will be aware of their former lives.
17. 十七者、有求皆從 They will obtain anything they ask.
18. 十八者、眷屬歡樂 Their families and relatives will be joyful.
19. 十九者、諸橫消滅 All disasters or accidents will be eliminated.
20. 二十者、業道永除 They will be rid of all bad karma.
21. 二十一者、去處盡通 They will go anywhere without problems.
22. 二十二者、夜夢安樂 They will have pleasant and peaceful dreams.
23. 二十三者、先亡離苦 Their deceased relatives will be far away from suffering.
24. 二十四者、宿福受生 They will receive the blessings from their past lives.
25. 二十五者、諸聖讚歎 They will be praised by Buddhas and Bodhisattvas.
26. 二十六者、聰明利根 They will become intelligent and have a good roots.
27. 二十七者、饒慈愍心 They will possess a merciful heart.
28. 二十八者、畢竟成佛 They will ultimately realize Buddhahood.

== English translations of the Sutra ==
- Anon Ksitigarbha Sutra https://ksitigarbhasutra.com/
- Buddhist Text Translation Society Sutra of the Past Vows of Earth Store Bodhisattva
  - With commentary by Master Hsuan Hua Sutra of the Past Vows of Earth Store Bodhisattva, with commentary by Master Hsuan Hua
- Pitt Chin Hui Sutra on the Original Vows and the attainment of Merits of Ksitigarbha Bodhisattva
- Shi Zhiru, (2026) Sutra on the Past Vows of Kṣitigarbha Bodhisattva (Numata Center for Buddhist Translation and Research, BDK English Tripiṭaka Series)
- Shi Yifa and Peter M. Romaskiewicz (2007) Sutra on the Past Vows of Ksitigarbha Bodhisattva.
- Tao-tsi Shih and Frank G French (1985) The Sutra Of Bodhisattva Ksitigarbha's Fundamental Vows (The Corporate Body of the Buddha Educational Foundation)
- Jeanne Tsai (2021) Original Vows of Ksitigarbha Bodhisattva Sutra (Fo Guang Shan International Translation Centre)
  - with commentary by Khenpo Sodargye Vol 1 , Vol 2 , Vol 3, Vol 4
