= Nīlakaṇṭha Dhāraṇī =

Buddhist mantra

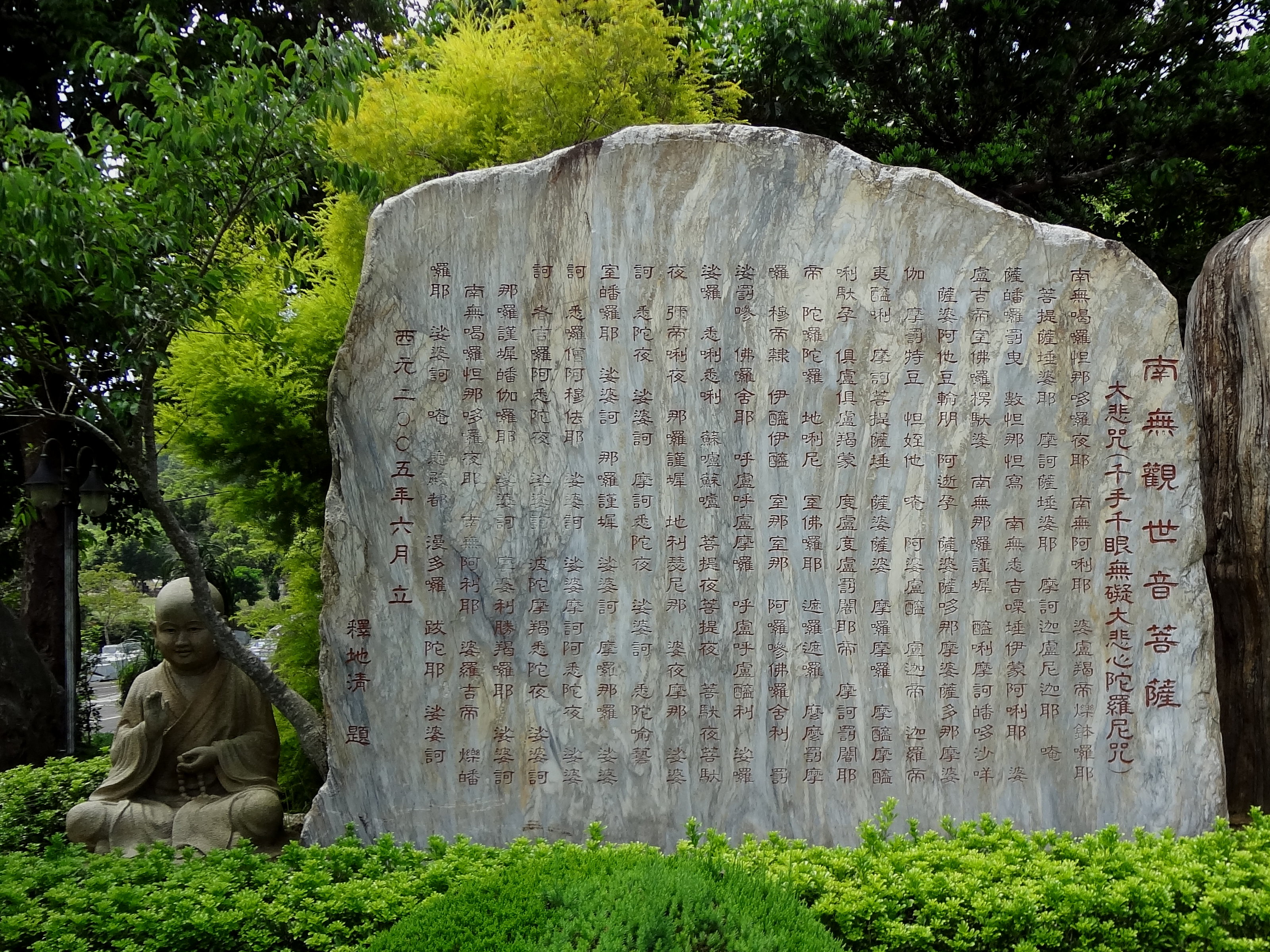
The Nīlakaṇṭha Dhāraṇī engraved on a stele at Fo Ding Shan Chao Sheng Temple in Sanyi Township, Taiwan. Erected in June 2005.

The Nīlakaṇṭha Dhāraṇī, also known as the Mahākaruṇā(-citta) Dhāraṇī, Mahākaruṇika Dhāraṇī or Great Compassion Dhāraṇī / Mantra (Chinese: 大悲咒, Dàbēi zhòu; Japanese: 大悲心陀羅尼, Daihishin darani or 大悲呪, Daihi shu; Vietnamese: Chú đại bi or Đại bi tâm đà la ni; Korean: 신묘장구대다라니 (Hanja: 神妙章句大陀羅尼), Sinmyo janggu daedarani), is a Mahayana Buddhist dhāraṇī associated with the bodhisattva Avalokiteśvara (popularly as Guanyin in the East Asian Buddhist sphere).

Avalokiteśvara came to be associated with attributes linked to Shiva and Vishnu, such as Nīlakaṇṭha and Harihara, as Buddhism developed within the Indian religious milieu and reinterpreted widely recognized divine symbols and epithets within a Buddhist framework. In Mahayana Buddhism, Avalokiteśvara was understood as a bodhisattva who manifests in different forms according to the needs and capacities of sentient beings, an idea expressed in texts such as the Lotus Sutra. In this context, Avalokiteśvara came to be understood not only as an independent bodhisattva but also as a figure incorporating certain attributes and functions associated with Shiva and Vishnu. The association of Avalokiteśvara with Shiva’s epithet Nīlakaṇṭha and with elements associated with Harihara may therefore be seen as the result of a Buddhist reinterpretation that presented the bodhisattva’s power of salvation in a broader and more inclusive form. Over time, Nīlakaṇṭha Avalokiteśvara also became linked with the thousand-armed (sahasra-bhuja) form and came to be understood as one of the bodhisattva’s many manifestations.

Different versions of this dhāraṇī, of varying length, exist; the shorter version, as transliterated into Chinese characters by Indian monk Bhagavaddharma in the 7th century, enjoys a high degree of popularity in East Asian Mahayana Buddhism, especially in Chinese Buddhism, comparable to that of the six-syllable mantra Oṃ maṇi padme hūṃ, which is also synonymous with Guanyin, who is Avalokiteśvara as venerated in China and other East Asian countries. It is often used for protection or purification. In China, Taiwan and overseas Chinese communities, it is typically chanted as part of daily morning liturgical services in Chinese Buddhist temples as well as recited during ritual and ceremonial contexts to purify the ritual space. In Korea, copies of the dhāraṇī are hung inside homes to bring auspiciousness. In Japan, it is especially associated with Zen, being revered and recited in Zen schools such as Sōtō or Rinzai.

== Versions ==
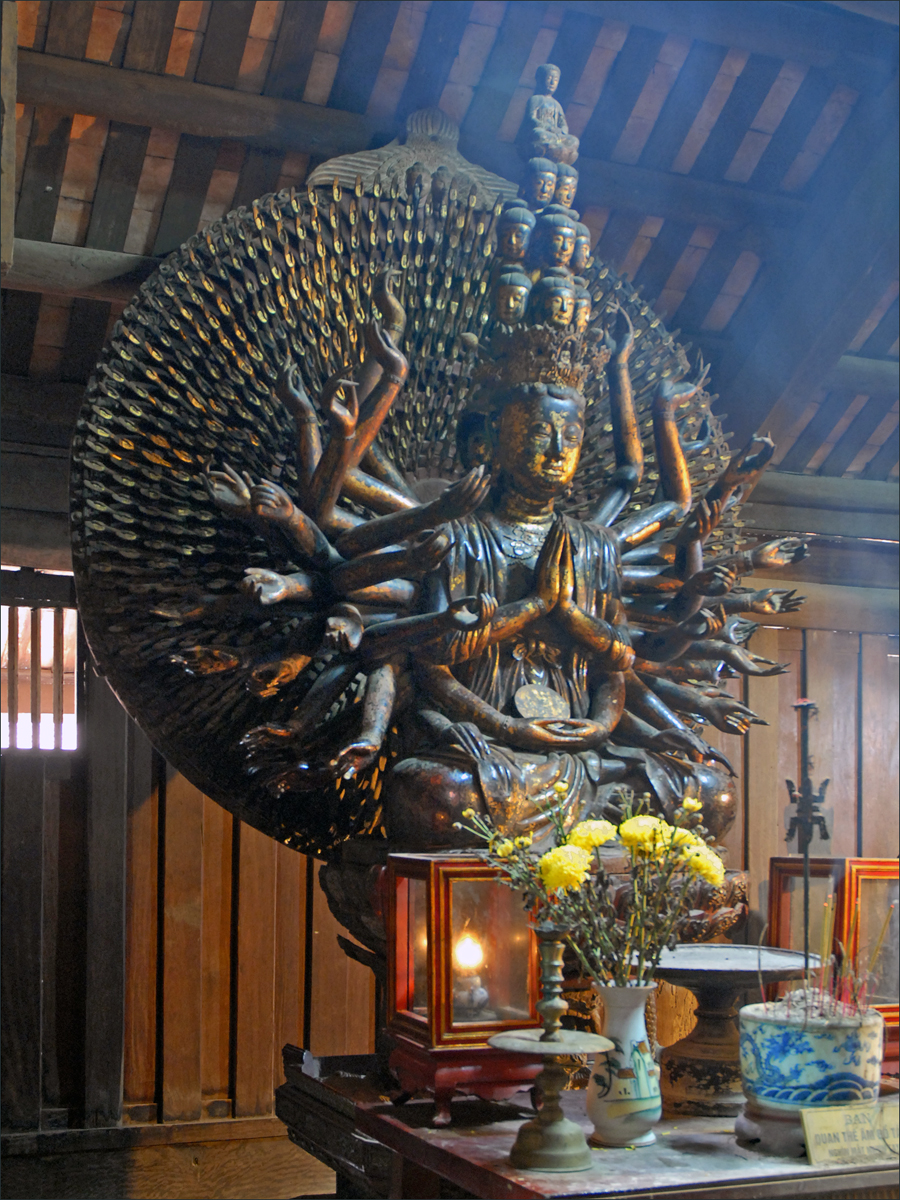
Thousand-armed Avalokiteśvara, crimson and gilded wood. Restored in 1656 CE. Bút Tháp Temple, Bắc Ninh Province, Vietnam

Various different recensions of this dhāraṇī are in existence, which can be classified into two main versions: the shorter text and the longer text.

=== Chinese ===
The text currently considered to be the standard in most of East Asia is the shorter version, specifically the one found in the so-called 'Sūtra of the Vast, Perfect, Unimpeded Great-Compassionate Heart of the Thousand-Handed Thousand-Eyed Bodhisattva Avalokiteśvara's Dhāraṇī' (Chinese: 千手千眼觀世音菩薩廣大圓滿無礙大悲心陀羅尼經; pinyin: Qiānshǒu qiānyǎn Guānshìyīn púsà guǎngdà yuánmǎn wúài dàbēixīn tuóluóní jīng; T. 1060, K. 0294) translated by a monk from western India named Bhagavaddharma (Chinese: 伽梵達摩; pinyin: Jiāfàndámó, birth and death dates unknown) between 650 and 660 CE.

Twelve scrolls of Nīlakaṇṭha Lokeśvara texts in Chinese were found at Dunhuang along the Silk Road in today's Gansu province of China. One of the texts contains a colophon at the end: "Translated at Khotan by the śramaṇa Bhagavaddharma of Western India" (西天竺伽梵達摩沙門於于闐譯). The milieu of this transliteration is evident from Bhagavaddharma's rendering of the word Nīlakaṇṭha as 'Narakindi' (Chinese: 那囉謹墀; pinyin: Nàlàjǐnchí), a Central Asian form of the Sanskrit word.

Other notable Chinese versions of the dhāraṇī include:

- Two versions by or attributed to esoteric Buddhist teacher Vajrabodhi: (1) 'Copy of the Vast, Perfect, Unimpeded Great-Compassionate Heart of the Thousand-Handed Thousand-Eyed Bodhisattva Avalokitasvara's Dhāraṇī' (Chinese: 千手千眼觀自在菩薩廣大圓滿無礙大悲心陀羅尼咒本; pinyin: Qiānshǒu qiānyǎn Guānzìzài púsà guǎngdà yuánmǎn wúài dàbēixīn tuóluóní zhòu běn; T. 1061) and (2) 'Ritual Recitation Manual on the Vajraśekhara Yoga on the Great Compassionate King Nīlakaṇṭha Avalokiteśvara' (Chinese: 金剛頂瑜伽青頸大悲王觀自在念誦儀軌; pinyin: Jīngāngdǐng yújiā qīngjǐng dàbēiwáng Guānzìzài niànsòng yí guǐ; T. 1112) The former contains a Chinese transliteration of the dhāraṇī and its corresponding Sanskrit version (in Siddhaṃ script), with the latter being an esoteric ritual manual.
- Three versions of the dhāraṇī proper by or attributed to Vajrabodhi's disciple Amoghavajra: (1) The Thousand-Handed Thousand-Eyed Bodhisattva Avalokitasvara's Great-Compassionate Heart Dhāraṇī (Chinese: 千手千眼觀世音菩薩大悲心陀羅尼; pinyin: Qiānshǒu qiānyǎn Guānshìyīn púsà dàbēixīn tuóluóní; T. 1064) is an extract from Bhagavaddharma's version, with interlinear glosses and an accompanying explanation of the forty hands (forty standing for the full number of one thousand) of the Thousand-armed Avalokiteśvara, each with a mantra of its own; (2) Sutra of the Bodhisattva Nīlakaṇṭha Avalokiteśvara's Heart Dhāraṇī (Chinese: 青頸觀自在菩薩心陀羅尼經; pinyin: Qīngjǐng Guānzìzài púsà xīn tuóluóní jīng; T. 1111) is a new transliteration, followed by a description of the iconography of Nīlakaṇṭha-Avalokiteśvara and his particular mudra; and (3) The Greatly Merciful (and) Greatly Compassionate Bodhisattva Avalokitasvara-lokeśvararāja's Vast, Perfect, Unimpeded Great-Compassionate Heart of Nīlakaṇṭheśvara Dharani (Chinese: 大慈大悲救苦觀世音自在王菩薩廣大圓滿無礙自在青頸大悲心陀羅尼; pinyin: Dàcí dàbēi jiùkǔ Guānshìyīn zìzàiwáng púsà guǎngdà yuánmǎn wúài zìzài qīngjǐng dàbēixīn tuóluóní; T. 1113b) is a Sanskrit (Siddhaṃ)-Chinese interlinear version with glosses.
- A version of the dhāraṇī proper by 14th century by Dhyānabhadra (Chinese: 指空; pinyin: Zhǐkōng, died 1363) with the title Dhāraṇī of the Vast, Perfect, Unimpeded Great-Compassionate Heart of the Bodhisattva Avalokiteśvara (Chinese: 觀自在菩薩廣大圓滿無礙大悲心陀羅尼; pinyin: Guānzìzài púsà guǎngdà yuánmǎn wúài dàbēixīn tuóluóní; T. 1113a) Unlike the aforementioned versions, Dhyānabhadra's text is based on the longer form of the dhāraṇī.

In addition, there are texts bearing the "Thousand-armed Avalokiteśvara" title, but which feature a completely different dhāraṇī within the text.

- Two translations by a monk named Zhitōng (智通) made between 627 and 649, both entitled Sūtra of the Thousand-Eyed Thousand-Armed Bodhisattva Avalokitasvara's Mystic Dhāraṇī (Chinese: 千眼千臂觀世音菩薩陀羅尼神咒經; pinyin: Qiānyǎn qiānbì Guānshìyīn púsà tuóluóní shénzhòu jīng; T. 1057a and 1057b, Nj. 318) This is the earliest of the Chinese "Thousand-armed Avalokiteśvara" sutras. Despite the title, the sutra's dhāraṇī is completely different from the Nīlakaṇṭha dhāraṇī found in other versions.
- A translation made by north Indian monk Bodhiruci in 709 entitled Sūtra of the Thousand-Handed Thousand-Eyed Bodhisattva-mother Avalokitasvara's Dhāraṇī-body (Chinese: 千手千眼觀世音菩薩姥陀羅尼身經; pinyin: Qiānshǒu qiānyǎn Guānshìyīn púsàmǔ tuóluóní shēn jīng; T. 1058, Nj. 319) Bodhiruci's version contains the same dhāraṇī as Zhitōng's.

=== Tibetan ===
At least three versions of the longer form of the dhāraṇī exist in Tibetan. One was made in the middle of the 9th century by a translator named Chödrup (Wylie: Chos grub; Chinese: 法成 Fǎchéng) supposedly from Chinese, but which does not correspond exactly to any Chinese version, being more akin to that of Vajrabodhi. Among the various versions of the dhāraṇī, it is the longest and fullest. Preceding Chödrup is an anonymous translation of the same text.

A third version was made by Changkya Rölpé Dorjé (Wylie: Lcang skya Rol pa'i Rdo rje) in the 18th century. While claimed to be a reconstruction of Zhitōng's text using a Tibetan version as a base, Changkya Rölpé Dorjé's text actually completely follows the Tibetan readings, with significant differences from Chödrup's version in a number of places, rather than Zhitōng's.

=== Others ===
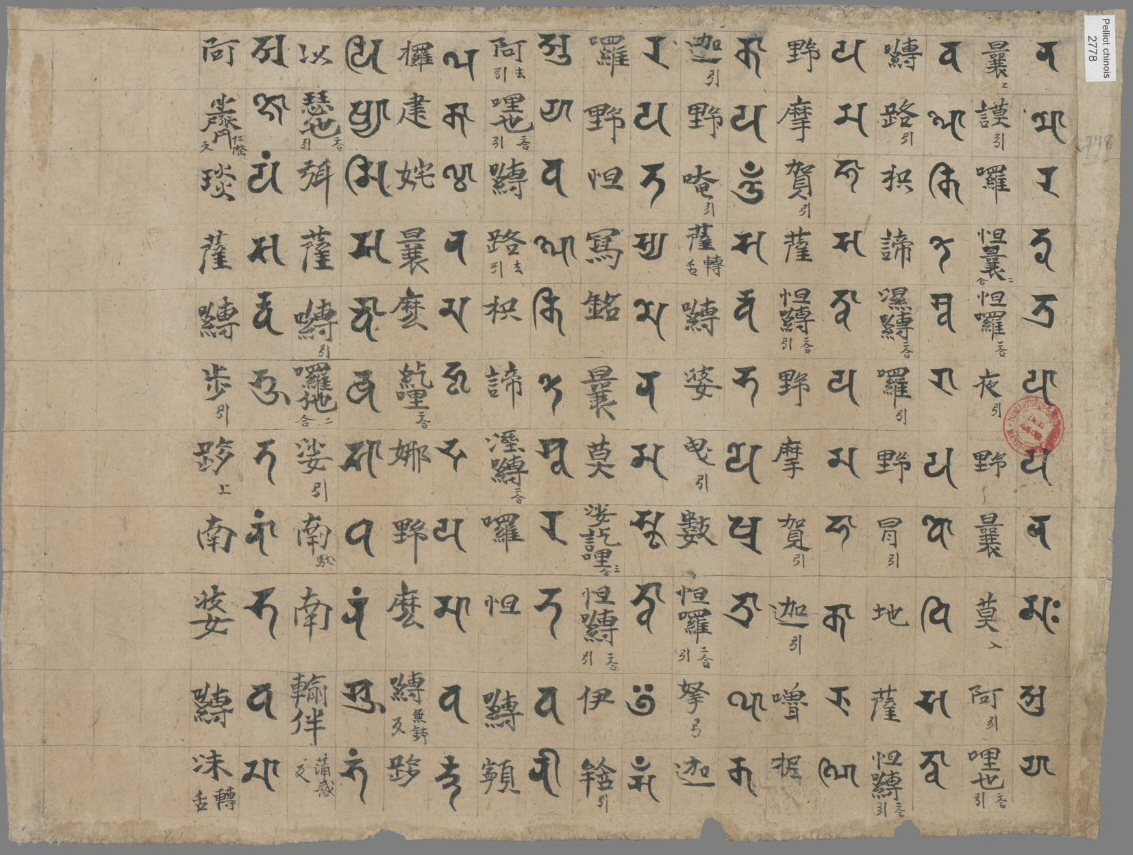
A manuscript from Dunhuang (Pelliot chinois 2778) containing the opening portion of the dhāraṇī written in Siddhaṃ script, with a transliteration into Chinese (text given behind).

A manuscript fragment (currently in the British Library) dating from around the 8th century containing the longer version of the dhāraṇī (Or.8212/175) in both late Brahmi and Sogdian scripts was discovered by Sir Aurel Stein in the Mogao Caves at Dunhuang and published by Robert Gauthiot and Louis de La Vallée-Poussin in 1912.

The dhāraṇī's title is given in this manuscript as 1 LPw δsty ʾʾryʾβṛʾwkδʾyšβr nyṛknt nʾm tʾrny "the dhāraṇī of the names of Āryāvalokiteśvara-Nīlakaṇṭha with a thousand hands." The text shows a very close affinity to that found in Vajrabodhi's T. 1061 text. The dhāraṇī is followed by a short, unidentified mantra named wyspw ʾʾγδʾk δβrʾynʾk δrzyʾwr ptsrwm "hṛdaya mantra fulfilling all the wishes."

== Background ==
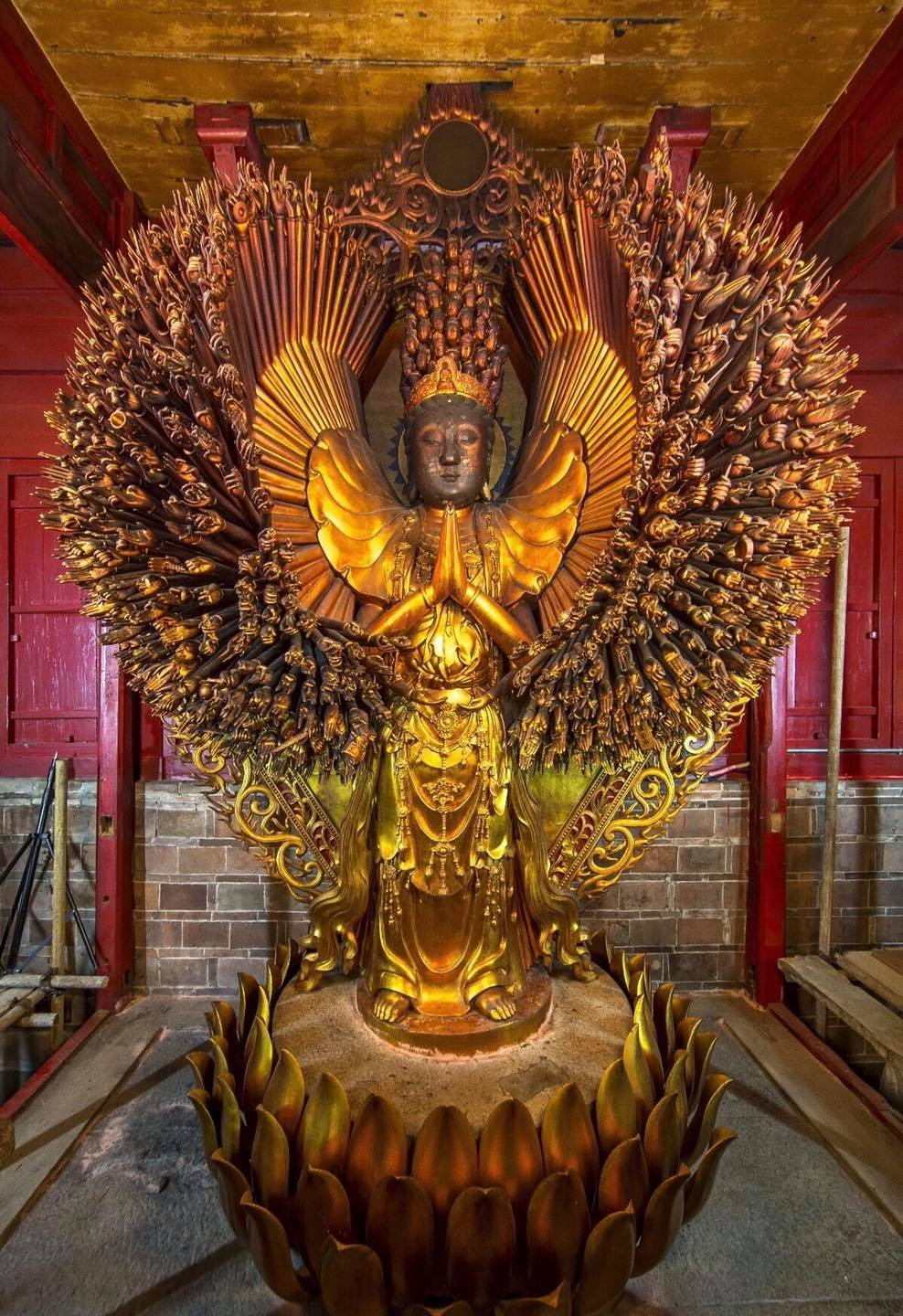
Ming dynasty wooden statue of the Thousand-Armed Guanyin (Avalokiteśvara in Chinese), enshrined in Longshan Temple in Fujian, China. Standing at 4.2 metres, the statue features 1008 arms and more than 25 heads. This manifestation of Guanyin is the one most closely identified with the Nīlakaṇṭha dhāraṇī in East Asian Buddhism.

=== Nīlakaṇṭha-lokeśvara ===
According to author Lokesh Chandra (1988), the dhāraṇī in its original form was a recitation of the names of the deity (lokeśvara) Nīlakaṇṭha recited by the bodhisattva Avalokiteśvara: "Avalokiteśvara was responsible for introducing popular (loka) deities (iśvara) into the Buddhist pantheon by pronouncing their dhāraṇīs which averted evils to the person who obtained his wishes as soon as he recited it (paṭhita-siddhaḥ, Dutt: text 44)." In Vajrabodhi's longer version (T. 1061), the dhāraṇī is explicitly referred to as Āryāvalokiteśvara-bhāṣitaṃ "uttered (bhāṣita) by noble (ārya) Avalokiteśvara;" at this stage, Avalokiteśvara is portrayed as pronouncing the dhāraṇī, but is not (yet) identified with Nīlakaṇṭha.

As late as the 15th century, the tradition knew at least that Avalokiteśvara is the dhāraṇī's locutor, as is clear from a Chinese manual of the liturgical service of the thousand-armed Avalokiteśvara, presented to the Oriental scholar Samuel Beal by the monks of Hoi Tong Monastery (a.k.a. Hai Chwang Temple) on Henan Island. Its preface, authored by the Ming emperor Yongle, says thus:

It is reported by Kwan Tseu Tsai Bodhisattva, prompted by her great compassionate heart has engaged herself by a great oath to enter into every one of the innumerable worlds, and bring deliverance to all creatures who inhabit them.
For this purpose she has enunciated the Divine sentences which follow, if properly recited, will render all creatures exempt from the causes of sorrow, and by removing them, render them capable of attaining Supreme Reason.

During the process of transmission, however, Nīlakaṇṭha became increasingly identified with Avalokiteśvara, so that the dhāraṇī eventually became understood as being addressed to Avalokiteśvara as Nīlakaṇṭha, now considered to be one of Avalokiteśvara's various forms or manifestations - most of whom were themselves originally folk deities who were assimilated into Avalokiteśvara upon being integrated into Buddhist belief and practice (e.g. Hayagriva, Cundi, Tara or Mazu; cf. also Shinbutsu-shūgō).

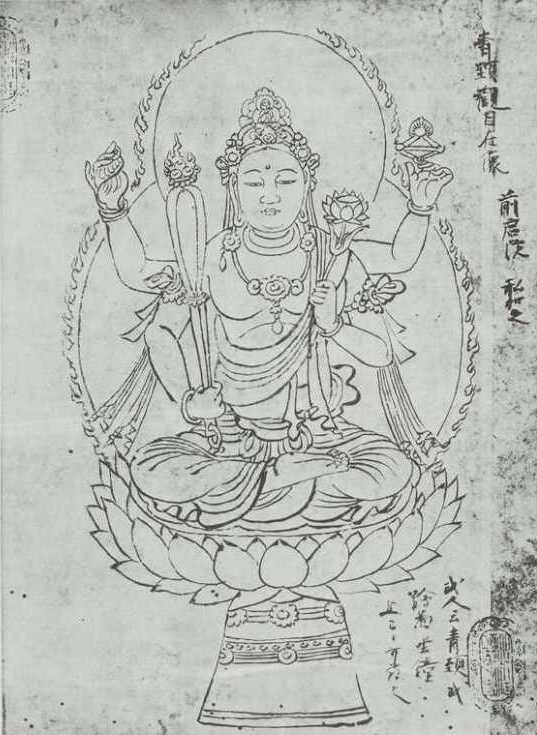
Nīlakaṇṭha-Avalokiteśvara (青頸觀自在), from the Besson-zakki, a Japanese (Heian period) compendium of Buddhist iconography. Note the differences between this particular depiction and the description from Amoghavajra: while the four attributes - conch, mace/rod, discus/wheel and lotus - are depicted, the boar and lion faces, the garments of animal skins, and the serpent upavita are omitted.

The dhāraṇī proper contains a number of titles associated with the Hindu gods Vishnu (e.g. Hare, Narasiṃha-mukha, gadā- / cakra- / padma-hastā 'the wielder of the mace / discus / lotus') and Shiva (e.g. Nīlakaṇṭha 'the blue-necked one', Śaṅkara, kṛṣṇa-sarpopavita 'the one who has a black serpent as a sacred thread'), suggesting that Nīlakaṇṭha was in origin Harihara - a fusion of Vishnu (Hari) and Shiva (Hara) - assimilated into Buddhism.

This is more explicit in the longer version of the dhāraṇī, where Nīlakaṇṭha is invoked with more names and epithets associated with the two gods such as Tripūra-dahaneśvara (Īśvara who destroyed Tripūra, an epithet of Shiva), and Padmanābha (lotus-naveled, an epithet of Vishnu) as well as a short description of the iconography of Nīlakaṇṭha Avalokiteśvara in Amoghavajra's version (T. 1111), which combines elements from depictions of Shiva and Vishnu.

Other examples are found in the following section:

Next, I shall explain here the manner of depicting the bodhisattva Nīlakaṇṭha-Avalokiteśvara.

His figure is three-faced: in the center is fashioned a compassionate, serene face, on the right a lion's face, (and) on the left a boar's face. On his head is a crown, (and) within the crown is an emanation (i.e. an image) of the buddha Amitāyus. In addition, he has four arms: the first right arm holds a rod, the second (right) arm grasps a lotus; the first left (arm) holds a wheel, (and) the second left (arm) holds a conch.

(Wearing) a tiger skin as his lower garment, a black antelope skin is draped diagonally from his left shoulder, and a black serpent is his sacred thread. Standing on an eight-petaled lotus, the effulgence of necklaces, armlets and ornaments adorn his body; his sacred thread hangs diagonally from the left shoulder downward."

The status of Shiva and Vishnu in the dhāraṇī follows a similar pattern to the one identified in the Kāraṇḍavyūha Sūtra (4th-5th century CE): the two gods are repeatedly invoked one after the other, indicating that they stand in a "complementary" relationship to each other. At the same time, however, Shiva is portrayed as the dominant of the two.

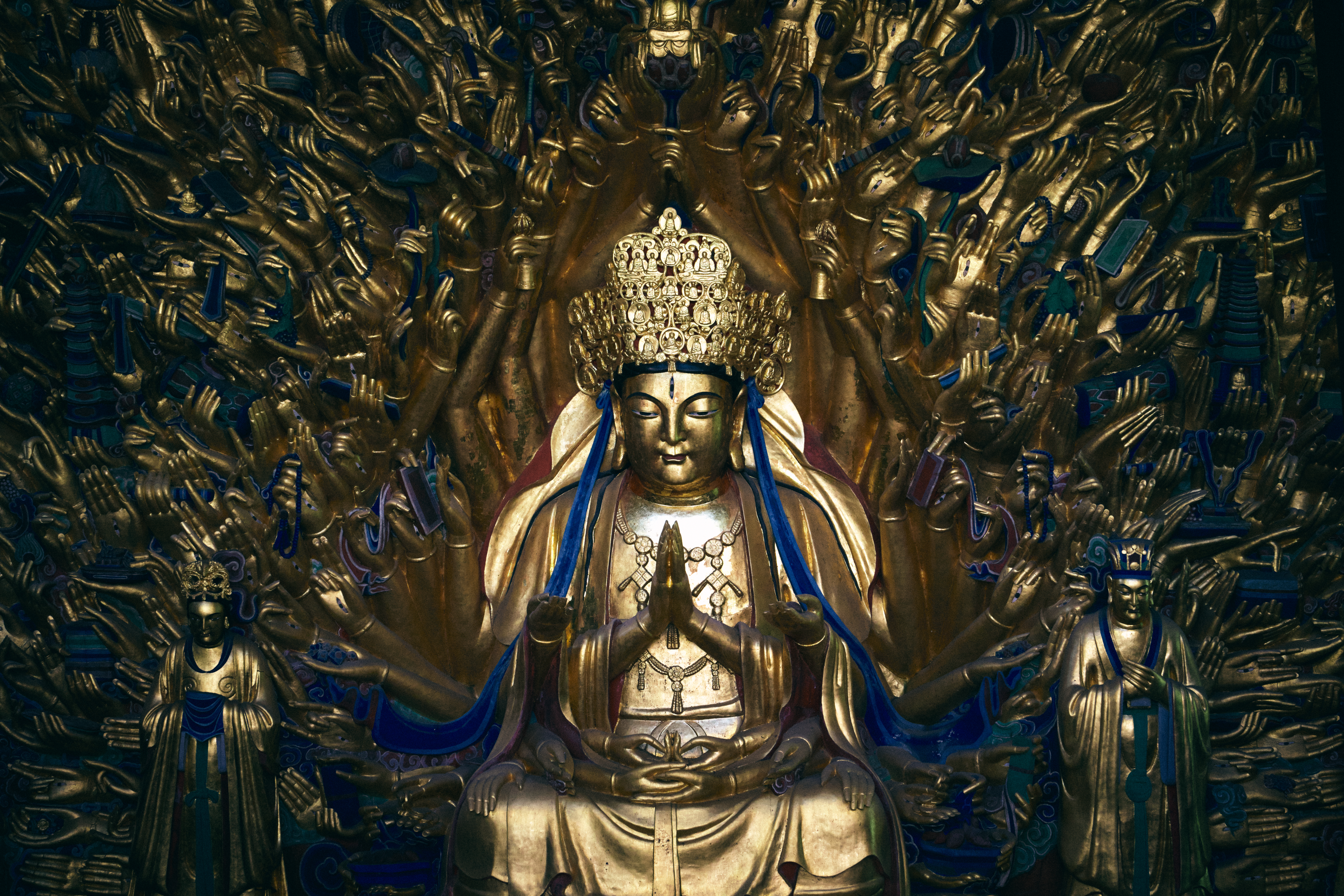
Tang dynasty (618-907) rock statue of the Thousand-Armed Guanyin (Avalokiteśvara) at Baodingshan at the Dazu Rock Carving in Chongqing, China.

=== The thousand-armed Avalokiteśvara ===
The first of many images of the thousand-armed (sahasra-bhuja) Avalokiteśvara - a form of the bodhisattva that would subsequently become popular in East Asia - to appear in China was presented to the Tang Emperor by a monk from central India named Guptadeva(?) (瞿多提婆, pinyin: Qúduōtípó) somewhere between 618 and 626 CE. While as of yet, no trace of this iconographic depiction has been found within India itself, the depiction must have had an Indian origin: an image of this type was brought to China by an Indian monk, and all the Chinese texts on the thousand-handed Avalokiteśvara are translations from Sanskrit or Pali and contain Sanskrit hymns in transliteration. One possibility is that this form of Avalokiteśvara had its origins in Kashmir, whence the Kāraṇḍavyūha Sūtra may also have originated. From Kashmir, the "thousandfold" Avalokiteśvara might have spread northward, but not southward into the Indian mainland, which could explain the dearth of Indian artifacts connected to this depiction.

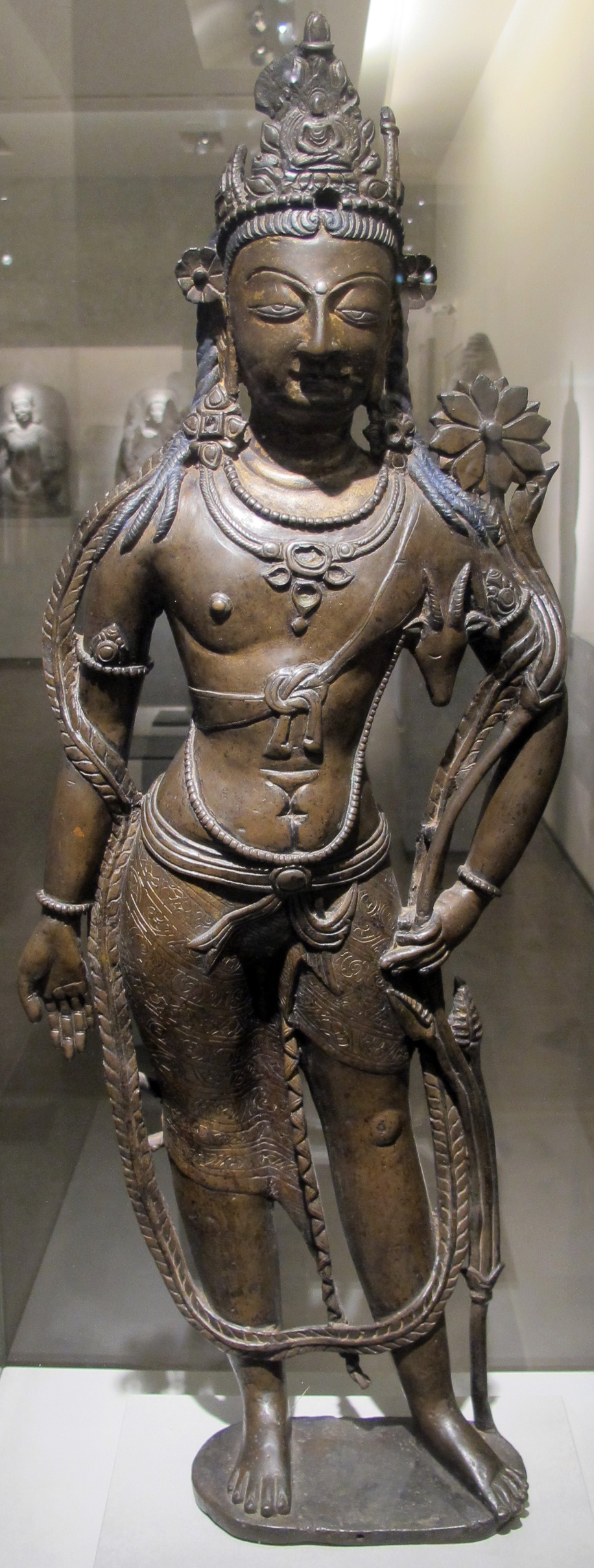
A 10th-11th century statue of Avalokiteśvara from the western Himayalan region, with the skin of a black antelope (kṛṣṇājina) - originally an attribute of Shiva - slung over his left shoulder.

A thousand limbs are integral to the Indian tradition: the Puruṣa sūkta of the Ṛgveda, for instance, describes the cosmic man Puruṣa as having "a thousand heads ... a thousand eyes, a thousand feet." Notably, the Kāraṇḍavyūha Sūtra contains a Buddhist adaptation of the Vedic Puruṣa myth, with Avalokiteśvara as the all-pervasive cosmic being from whose body springs various gods:

"Āditya and Candra came from his eyes, Maheśvara came from his forehead, Brahmā came from his shoulders, Nārāyaṇa came from his heart, Devi Sarasvatī came from his canines, Vāyu came from his mouth, Dharaṇī came from his feet, and Varuṇa came from his stomach."

The epithets sahasra-bāhu ('thousand-armed') or sahasra-bhuja ('thousand-handed') commonly appear in Indian literature from the Ṛgveda onwards applied to various personages (e.g. Kartavirya Arjuna), including the gods Shiva and Vishnu. It has been suggested that the thousand arms of Avalokiteśvara is another example of an attribute of Shiva being assimilated into the bodhisattva, with the thousand arms being a symbol of the victory of Avalokiteśvara (and Buddhism) over Shiva, whose name 'Īśvara' he appropriates, and his cult. (Cf. Trailokyavijaya, one of the five Wisdom Kings, depicted as trampling on Maheśvara - the Buddhist version of Shiva - and his consort.) The thousand-armed Avalokiteśvara's eleven heads, meanwhile, are thought to be derived from the eleven Rudras, forms and companions of Shiva (Rudra).

Originally portrayed as a servant or acolyte of the buddha Amitābha in some of the texts which mention him, Avalokiteśvara - originally 'Avalokita(svara)' - also later came to be depicted as one who brought popular deities into Buddhism by pronouncing their hymns, thereby according them a place in Buddhist scriptures and ritual. Eventually, however, these deities came to be identified as different forms or manifestations of the bodhisattva himself. Thus Avalokiteśvara gradually took on forms, attributes and titles originally ascribed to Shiva and/or to Vishnu such as sahasra-bhuja, sahasra-netra ('thousand-eyed'), Īśvara, Maheśvara, Hari, or Nīlakaṇṭha.

The emergence of Avalokiteśvara's thousand-armed form is linked with the interiorisation of Shiva into the bodhisattva as Viśvarūpa. The dhāraṇī of 'Nīlakaṇṭha' (i.e. Harihara - Vishnu and Shiva - later conflated with Avalokiteśvara) became attached to the sahasra-bhuja Avalokiteśvara (of which Harihara was the prototype), so that the thousand-armed form became seen as a bestower of royal authority, a trait carried over from Nīlakaṇṭha/Harihara. Indeed, in Sri Lanka, Tibet and Southeast Asia, Avalokiteśvara became associated with the state and with royalty.

Classic Mahayana teaching holds that Avalokiteśvara is able to manifest in different forms according to the needs of different individuals. In the Lotus Sūtra, it is stated that Avalokiteśvara can appear in different guises - which includes that of 'Īśvara' and 'Maheśvara' - to teach the Dharma to various classes of beings.

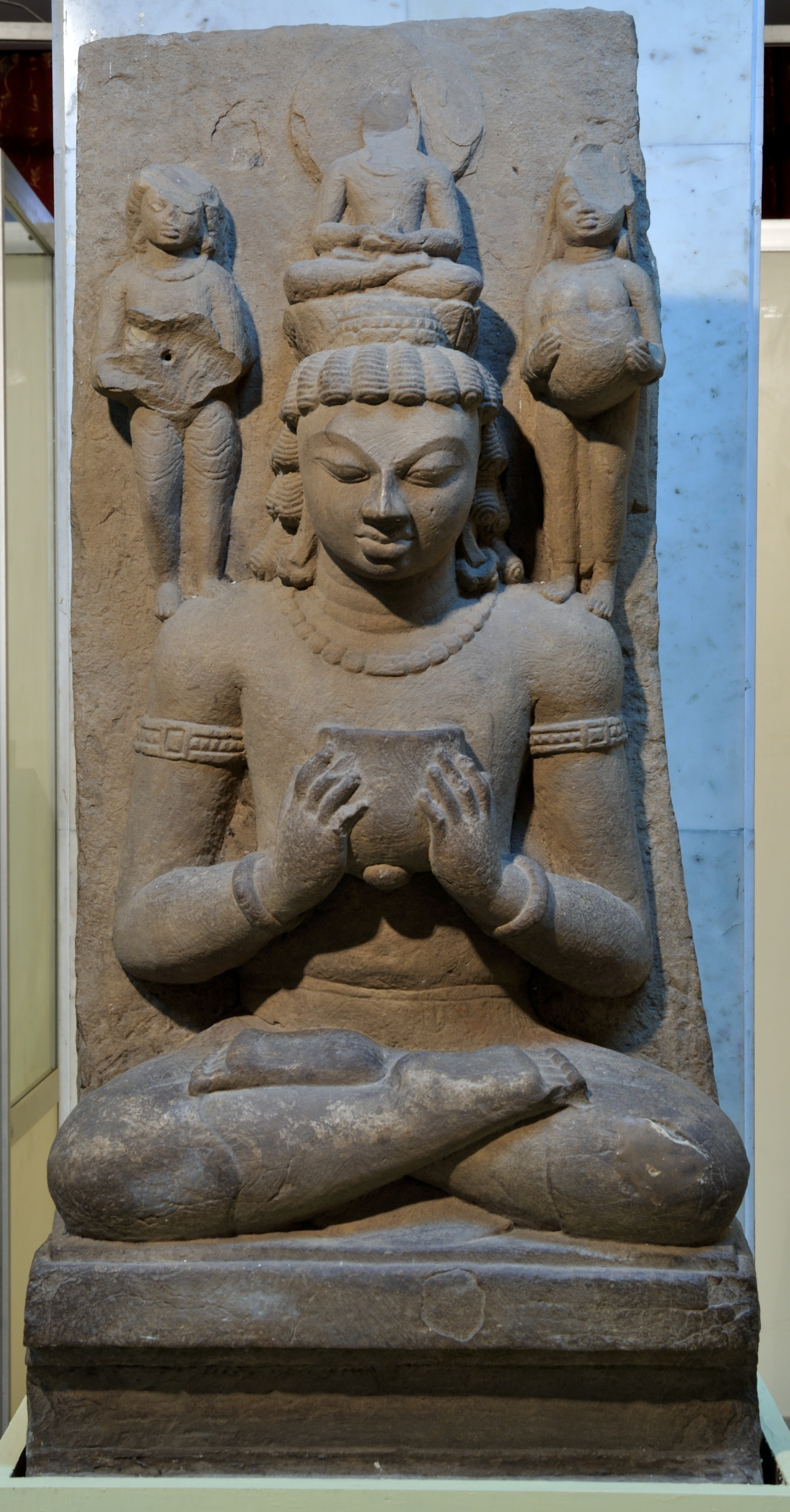
A sandstone sculpture of Nīlakaṇṭha Avalokiteśvara from Sarnath circa 6th century CE. This particular depiction is based on the Hindu god Shiva about to swallow the halāhala poison.

The Buddha said to Bodhisattva Akṣayamati: "O son of a virtuous family! If there is any land where sentient beings are to be saved by the form of a buddha, Bodhisattva Avalokiteśvara teaches the Dharma by changing himself into the form of a buddha. ... To those who are to be saved by the form of Brahma, he teaches the Dharma by changing himself into the form of Brahma. To those who are to be saved by the form of Śakra, he teaches the Dharma by changing himself into the form of Śakra. To those who are to be saved by the form of Īśvara, he teaches the Dharma by changing himself into the form of Īśvara. To those who are to be saved in the form of Maheśvara, he teaches the Dharma by changing himself into the form of Maheśvara. ... To those who are to be saved by the form of a human or of a nonhuman such as a deva, nāga, yakṣa, gandharva, asura, garuḍa, kiṃnara, or mahoraga, he teaches the Dharma by changing himself into any of these forms."

A similar statement appears in the Kāraṇḍavyūha Sūtra:

Bhagavat Śikhin replied, 'He [Avalokiteśvara] completely ripens the many beings who circle in saṃsāra, teaches them the path to enlightenment, and teaches the Dharma in whatever form a being can be taught through. He teaches the Dharma in the form of a tathāgata to beings who are to be taught by a tathāgata. He teaches the Dharma in the form of a pratyekabuddha to beings who are to be taught by a pratyekabuddha. He teaches the Dharma in the form of an arhat to beings who are to be taught by an arhat. He teaches the Dharma in the form of a bodhisattva to beings who are to be taught by a bodhisattva. He teaches the Dharma in the form of Maheśvara to beings who are to be taught by Maheśvara. He teaches the Dharma in the form of Nārāyaṇa to beings who are to be taught by Nārāyaṇa. He teaches the Dharma in the form of Brahmā to beings who are to be taught by Brahmā. ... He teaches the Dharma in whatever particular form a being should be taught through. That, noble son, is how Bodhisattva Mahāsattva Avalokiteśvara completely ripens beings and teaches them the Dharma of nirvāṇa.'

Despite being a latecomer among the esoteric forms of Avalokiteśvara introduced into China, because of the promotion of his cult by the three esoteric masters (Śubhakarasiṃha, Vajrabodhi and Amoghavajra have all made translations of thousand-armed Avalokitesvara texts) and patronage by the imperial court, the sahasra-bhuja Avalokitesvara overtook and absorbed the fame of other tantric forms of the bodhisattva.

=== Bhagavaddharma's version (T. 1060) and its popularity ===
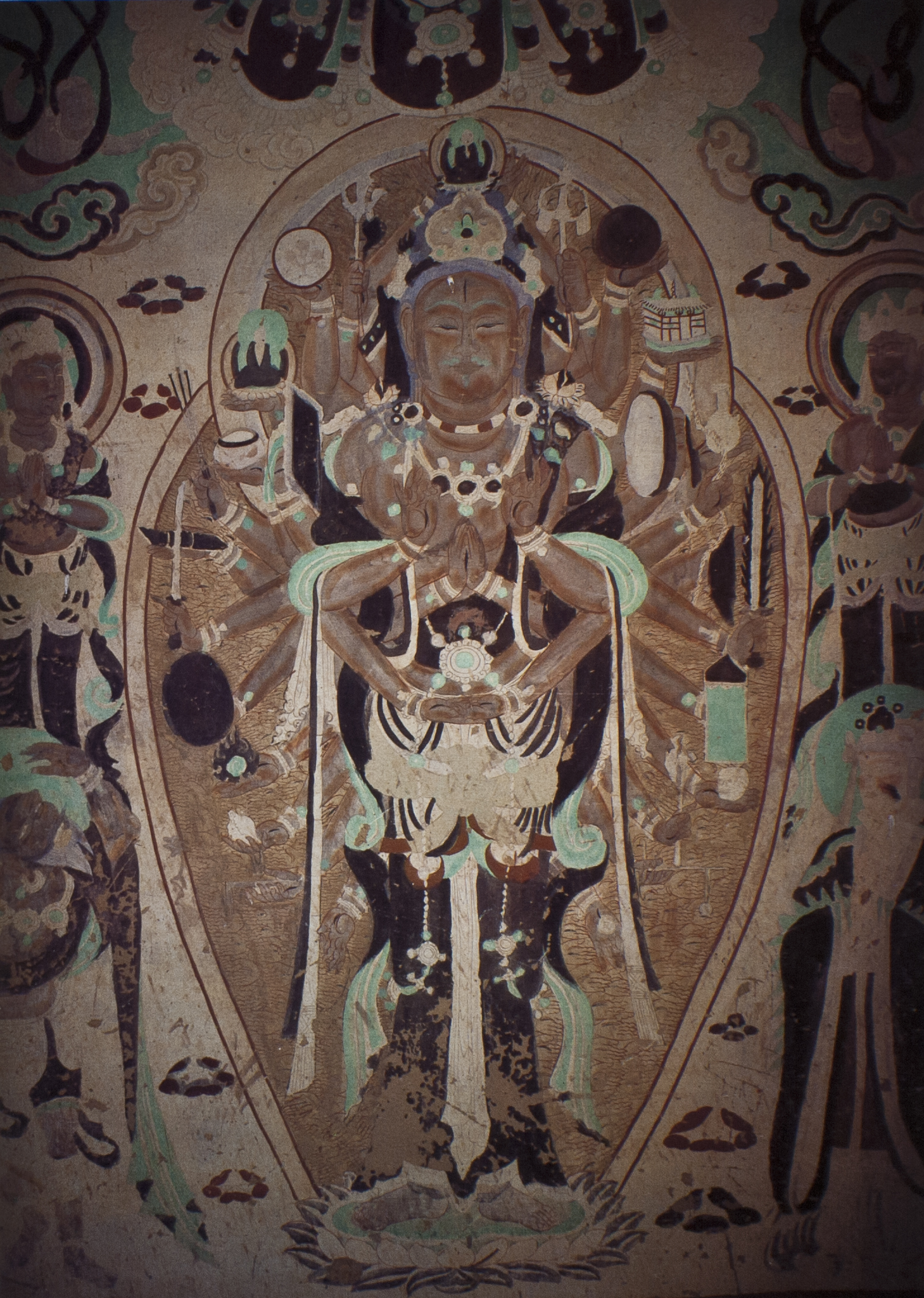
A Tang dynasty period depiction of the Thousand-Armed Guanyin (Avalokiteśvara) from the Yulin Caves, Gansu Province, China.

Out of the various transliterations of the dhāraṇī in Chinese, that of Bhagavaddharma (T. 1060) has risen to become the standard in East Asia.

Bhagavaddharma was a monk who came to China from western India around the mid-7th century, about whom nothing else is known; the Taishō Tripitaka has only two works in Chinese by him, both on the thousand-armed Avalokiteśvara (T. 1059, 1060). The latter of these two works, the 'Sūtra of the Vast, Perfect, Unimpeded Great-Compassionate Heart of the Thousand-Handed Thousand-Eyed Bodhisattva Avalokitasvara's Dhāraṇī', made at Khotan around 650-661 CE, has made him immortal. The popularity of his version is attested by surviving Dunhuang manuscripts dated to the 8th century, some of which are excerpts of the ten great vows contained in the sūtra.

In China itself, various anecdotes about miracles effected by the recitation of the dhāraṇī appear from the Tang dynasty onwards. As the dhāraṇī's efficacy became widely known, dhāraṇī pillars on which the dhāraṇī's text was inscribed began to be erected, the earliest of these dating from 871 CE. By the end of the period, both the sūtra text and the dhāraṇī circulated among the monks and the laity, with copies being made either as pious offerings or commissioned by the faithful to obtain religious merit. An abbreviated version of the sūtra, consisting of only the ten great vows recited by Avalokiteśvara within the text (see 'Summary' below) and the dhāraṇī itself, was also in circulation. Known as the 'Invocation of the Great Compassionate One' (大悲啟請 Dàbēi qǐqǐng), this text was probably used in a liturgical setting.

The reason behind the subsequent popularity of Bhagavaddharma's sūtra is thought to be due to its relative simplicity compared to other versions: while other sūtras on the thousand-armed Avalokiteśvara contained detailed rules on how to visualize and depict this form of the bodhisattva, the very lack of such instructions in Bhagavaddharma's text might have contributed to its democratic appeal for ordinary people. In addition, Bhagavaddharma's version is the only one that contained the sections on the ten great vows and the blessing of the fifteen kinds of good deaths as well as protection from fifteen kinds of bad deaths. The dhāraṇī's concrete power over death and the comprehensiveness of Avalokiteśvara's vows might have been another factor that appealed to the masses.

Because of the great popularity enjoyed by this sūtra, the epithet 'Great Compassionate One' (大悲 Dàbēi) became identified specifically with the sahasra-bhuja Avalokiteśvara from the Tang period on, though previously it was used in other sūtras to describe Avalokiteśvara in general.

==== Summary of Bhagavaddharma's version ====
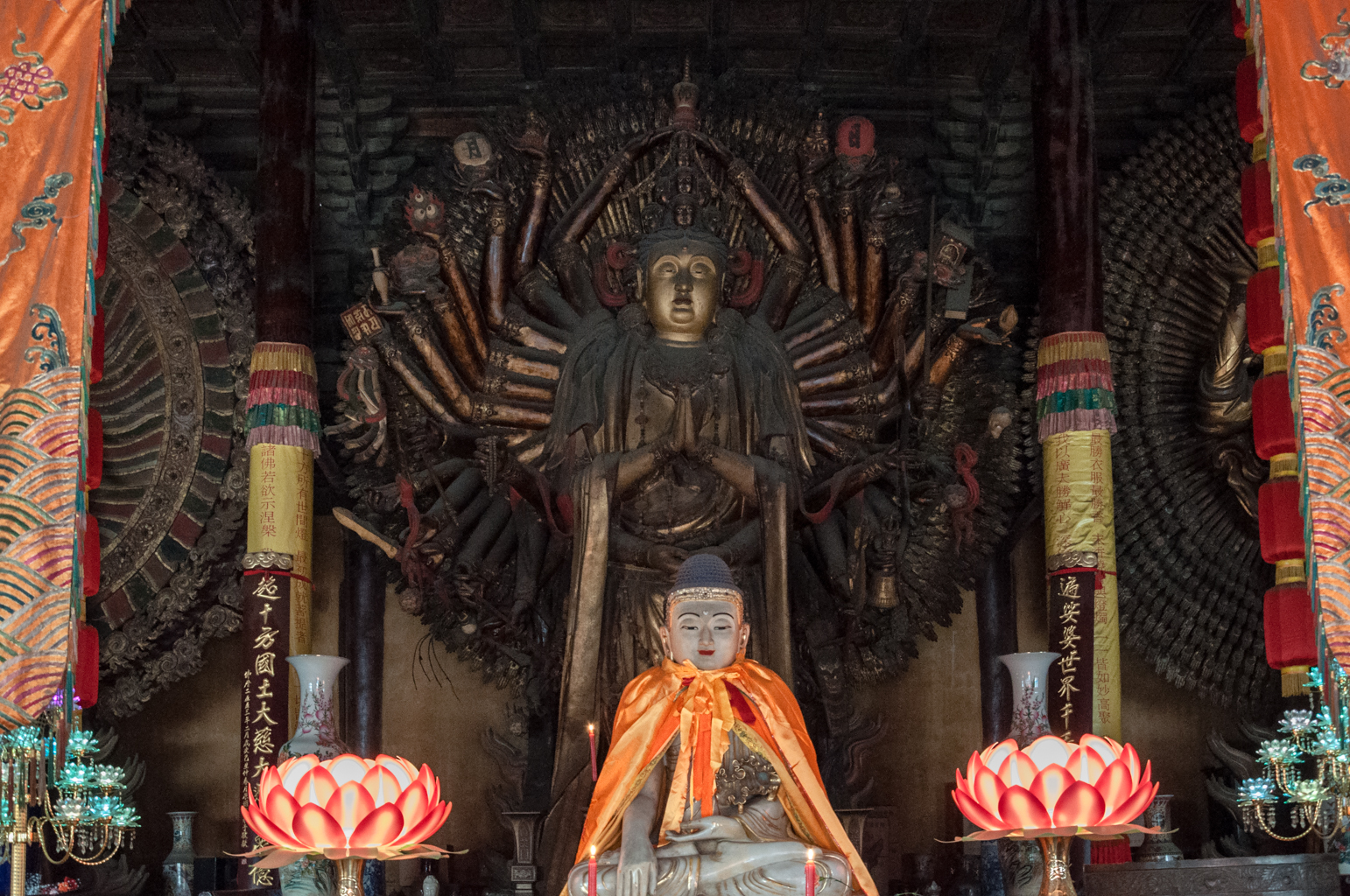
Ming dynasty statue of the Thousand-Armed Guanyin (Qianshou Guanyin) enshrined in Shanhua Temple in Shanxi, China.

Bhagavaddharma's text begins with Śākyamuni Buddha in Avalokiteśvara's palace on the island Potalaka about to preach to a congregation of bodhisattvas, arhats, devas and other beings. Suddenly there is a great illumination and the three thousand realms become golden in color, shaking all over while the sun and moon become dull by comparison. One of the bodhisattvas present, Dhāraṇī King (總持王菩薩), asks the Buddha why this is happening; the Buddha reveals that Avalokiteśvara secretly emitted this light "in order to comfort and please all living-beings."

Avalokiteśvara then begins to speak, revealing that innumerable kalpas ago, the Thousand-light King Tathāgata of Tranquil Abode (千光王靜住如來) entrusted to him the 'Dhāraṇī of the Great Compassionate Heart' (大悲心陀羅尼呪). As soon as he heard the dhāraṇī, Avalokiteśvara - who had then been a bodhisattva of the first stage - quickly advanced to the eighth stage, and after reciting a vow, became endowed with a thousand hands and eyes: "So from that epoch long ago, I have kept the dhāraṇī. As a result, I have always been born where there is a buddha. Moreover, I have never undergone birth from a womb, but am always transformed from a lotus."

After giving this explanation, he then calls upon anyone who wants to keep this dhāraṇī to give rise to the thought of compassion for all sentient beings by making the following ten vows after him.

Namaḥ Avalokiteśvara of Great Compassion, may I quickly learn all Dharma.

Namaḥ Avalokiteśvara of Great Compassion, may I speedily obtain the eye of wisdom.
Namaḥ Avalokiteśvara of Great Compassion, may I quickly save all sentient beings.
Namaḥ Avalokiteśvara of Great Compassion, may I speedily obtain skillful means.
Namaḥ Avalokiteśvara of Great Compassion, may I quickly sail on the prajñā boat.
Namaḥ Avalokiteśvara of Great Compassion, may I speedily cross over the ocean of suffering.
Namaḥ Avalokiteśvara of Great Compassion, may I quickly obtain the way of discipline and meditation.
Namaḥ Avalokiteśvara of Great Compassion, may I speedily ascend the nirvāṇa mountain.
Namaḥ Avalokiteśvara of Great Compassion, may I quickly enter the house of non-action.
Namaḥ Avalokiteśvara of Great Compassion, may I speedily achieve the Dharma-Body.

If I face a mountain of knives, may it naturally crumble, if I face a roaring fire, may it naturally burn out, if I face hell, may it naturally disappear, if I face a hungry ghost, may it naturally be satiated, if I face an Asura, may its evil heart gradually become tame and, if I face an animal, may it naturally obtain great wisdom.

After making such vows, one should then sincerely call the name of Avalokiteśvara as well as the name of Amitābha Buddha, Avalokiteśvara's original teacher.

Avalokiteśvara stresses the dhāraṇī's efficacy by vowing that should anyone who recites it fall into an evil realm of rebirth, or not be born into one of the buddha lands, or not attain unlimited samādhi and eloquence, or not get whatever he desires in his present life, or, in the case of a woman, if she detests the female body and wants to become a man, he (Avalokiteśvara) will not achieve complete, perfect enlightenment, unless those who recited it were insincere, in which case they will not reap its benefits.

Aside from such spiritual and mundane benefits as removing grave sins caused by heinous acts such as the five crimes or the ten evil acts (Note: Killing, stealing, sexual misconduct, lying, flattery or irresponsible speech, defamation, duplicity, greed, anger, and foolishness or the holding of mistaken views.) or curing 84,000 kinds of illnesses, the sincere keeping of the dhāraṇī is said to also result in fifteen kinds of good rebirth (e.g. being ruled by a virtuous king wherever one is born, fully endowed with money and food, can see the Buddha and listen to the Dharma in the place of birth) and the avoidance of fifteen kinds of evil deaths (e.g. suicide, death on the battlefield, death by starvation).

Avalokiteśvara then recites the dhāraṇī; the earth shakes in six ways, while precious flowers rain down from the sky. As all the buddhas of the ten directions are delighted and practitioners of heterodox ways become frightened, all the assembled reach different levels of realization. Upon being asked by Mahābrahmā (大梵天王), Avalokiteśvara goes on to further explain the dhāraṇī's benefits, both spiritual and temporal, and recites a gāthā commanding various benevolent devas, nāgas and yakṣas to guard the keepers of the dhāraṇī.

Like all esoteric sūtras, this sūtra shows interest in ritual matters. As part of the sādhanā or ritual requirement, detailed instructions on constructing a sacred space or boundary are provided: the dhāraṇī is to be recited twenty-one times over a particular item such as a knife, pure water, white mustard seed, clean ashes, or five colored twine, which would then be used to demarcate the boundary. The sūtra also offers many recipes employing the dhāraṇī to deal with various mundane problems (e.g. to ease a difficult childbirth or to cure scotophobia or snakebite) or to attain specific goals (e.g. commanding a ghost or the four guardian gods, repelling foreign invasions or natural disasters away from one's own country).

The sūtra then ends by identifying the names of the forty mudrās of the thousand-armed Avalokiteśvara - forty standing for the full number of a thousand - and the respective benefits they bestow on the worshipper. These mudrās are only described verbally on Bhagavaddharma's version; illustrated depictions are found in the version by Amoghavajra (T. 1064).

== In Buddhist practice ==
The Nīlakaṇṭha dhāraṇī, now firmly associated with the sahasra-bhuja form of Avalokiteśvara, enjoys a huge popularity in East Asian Mahayana Buddhism.

=== Chinese Buddhism ===
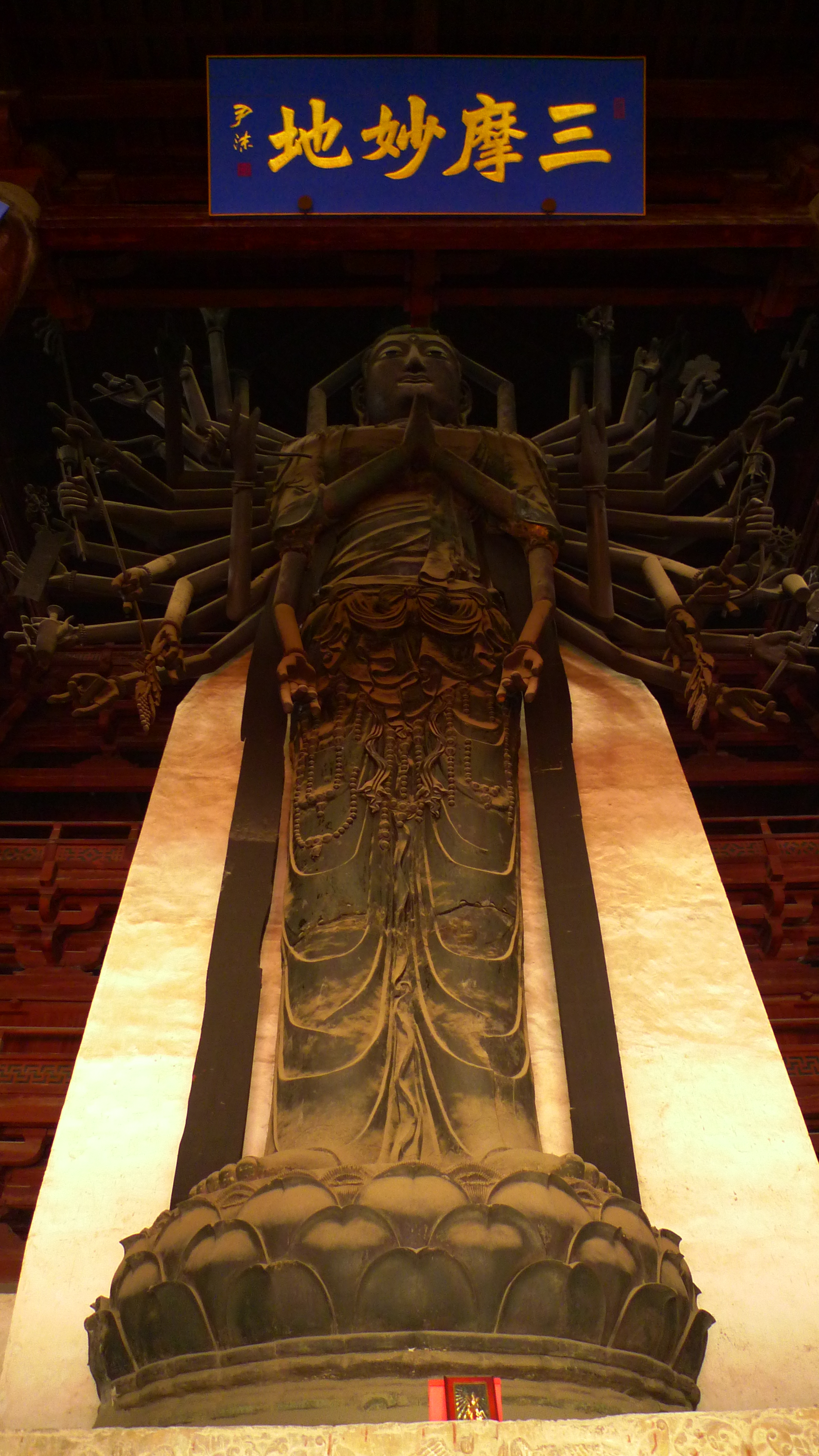
Colossal 21.3 metre bronze Song dynasty (960-1279) statue of the Thousand-Armed Guanyin (Qianshou Guanyin) enshrined in the Guanyin Dian of Longxing Temple in Hebei, China.

The dhāraṇī is especially revered in China, Taiwan and overseas Chinese communities, where the thousand-armed (Sahasra-bhuja) Avalokiteśvara, known commonly as Qianshou Guanyin (千手觀音 Qiānshǒu Guānyīn), is the most popular among the bodhisattva's forms. It is most often called the 'Great Compassion Mantra' (大悲咒 Dàbēi zhòu) in popular parlance, an epithet also (mistakenly) applied to a different, much shorter dhāraṇī, that of the Eleven-headed Avalokiteśvara (Ekādaśamukha). Musical renditions of this latter dhāraṇī (such as those made by Imee Ooi or Ani Choying Dolma) are often labelled the Tibetan Great Compassion Mantra (traditional: 藏傳大悲咒, simplified: 藏传大悲咒 Zàngchuán Dàbēi zhòu) or The Great Compassion Mantra in Sanskrit (梵音大悲咒 Fànyīn Dàbēi zhòu) in recordings, adding to the confusion.

In most Chinese Buddhist temples, the Nīlakaṇṭha dhāraṇī is traditionally chanted daily as part of the morning liturgical service known as the zaoke (早課), and is also widely used in various common rituals. For instance, during the popular Shuilu Fahui ceremony, which is an extensive and elaborate ritual that usually takes place over several days with multiple altars, the dhāraṇī is chanted by monastics while invoking Guanyin to the Inner Altar in order to empower sacred water, which is then later sprinkled around the altar using a willow leaf to purify it. As another example, the dhāraṇī is utilized in a similar purificatory way during the widely practiced tantric Yujia Yankou ritual, where the central monastic(s) carrying out the rite performs deity yoga with Guanyin. Notably, the popularity and ubiquitousness of the Nīlakaṇṭha dhāraṇī in the Chinese Buddhist milieu is also exemplified by a widely practiced repentance rite inspired by the sūtra in which the dhāraṇī was expounded known as the Dabei Chan (大悲懺, lit: "Great Compassion Repentance Ritual"). This rite has remained a regular part of the Chinese Buddhist ritual field since its inception by the Song dynasty Tiantai Patriarch Siming Zhili (四明知禮, 960-1028), being performed at least once a month in most Chinese Buddhist temples in contemporary times. During a section of the ritual, Guanyin's ten vows in the sūtra are chanted before the Nīlakaṇṭha dhāraṇī is recited up to fourteen or twenty-one times.

=== Korean Buddhism ===
In Korea, the dhāraṇī - usually referred to as Sinmyo janggu daedalani (신묘장구대다라니; Hanja: 神妙章句大陀羅尼 "The Great Dhāraṇī of Wondrous Verses") or as Cheon-su gyeong (천수경; Hanja: 千手經 "Thousand Hands Sutra") - is also a regular fixture of Buddhist ritual. Copies of the dhāraṇī (written in Hangul and the Korean variant of Siddhaṃ script) are hung inside homes to bring auspiciousness.

=== Japanese Buddhism ===
In Japan, the dhāraṇī is most often associated with the Zen schools of Buddhism such as Sōtō (where it is called 大悲心陀羅尼 Daihishin darani "Dhāraṇī of the Great Compassionate Heart") or Rinzai (which dubs the dhāraṇī 大悲円満無礙神呪 Daihi Enman Muge (or Enmon Bukai) Jinshu "Divine Mantra of the Vast, Perfect Great Compassion" or 大悲呪 Daihi shu - the Japanese reading of Dabei zhou), where it is extensively used: as in many other parts of East Asia, it is chanted daily by Zen monks, and used in funerals as well as in hungry ghost feeding ceremonies (segaki).

A version of the dhāraṇī is also found within the esoteric Shingon school: in the early 20th century it was apparently counted as one of three dhāraṇīs (三陀羅尼 san darani) especially revered within the school, the other two being the Buddhoṣṇīṣa Vijaya Dhāraṇī (仏頂尊勝陀羅尼 Bucchō-sonshō darani) and the Guhyadhātu Karaṇḍa-mudrā Dhāraṇī (宝篋印陀羅尼 Hōkyō-in darani). Since then, however, the Root Dhāraṇī of Amitābha (阿弥陀如来根本陀羅尼 Amida nyorai konpon darani) - once counted as an alternative candidate to the Nīlakaṇṭha dhāraṇī - seems to have overtaken its place.

=== Vietnamese Buddhism ===
In Vietnam, the dhāraṇī is called Chú Đại Bi (the Vietnamese translation of the Chinese title 大悲咒 Dàbēi zhòu), It is almost similar to the version of Bhagavaddharma, albeit with a different way of dividing the text (84 verses instead of 82). The text is available in two forms: either without the verse numbering, or with verse numbering (1-84). At the entrance of many pagodas, especially in tourist places, the Chú Đại Bi is made available to visitors, either printed on a single sheet in black and white, or as a color booklet on glossy paper. They are printed on the initiative of Buddhist practitioners who make an offering to the sangha.

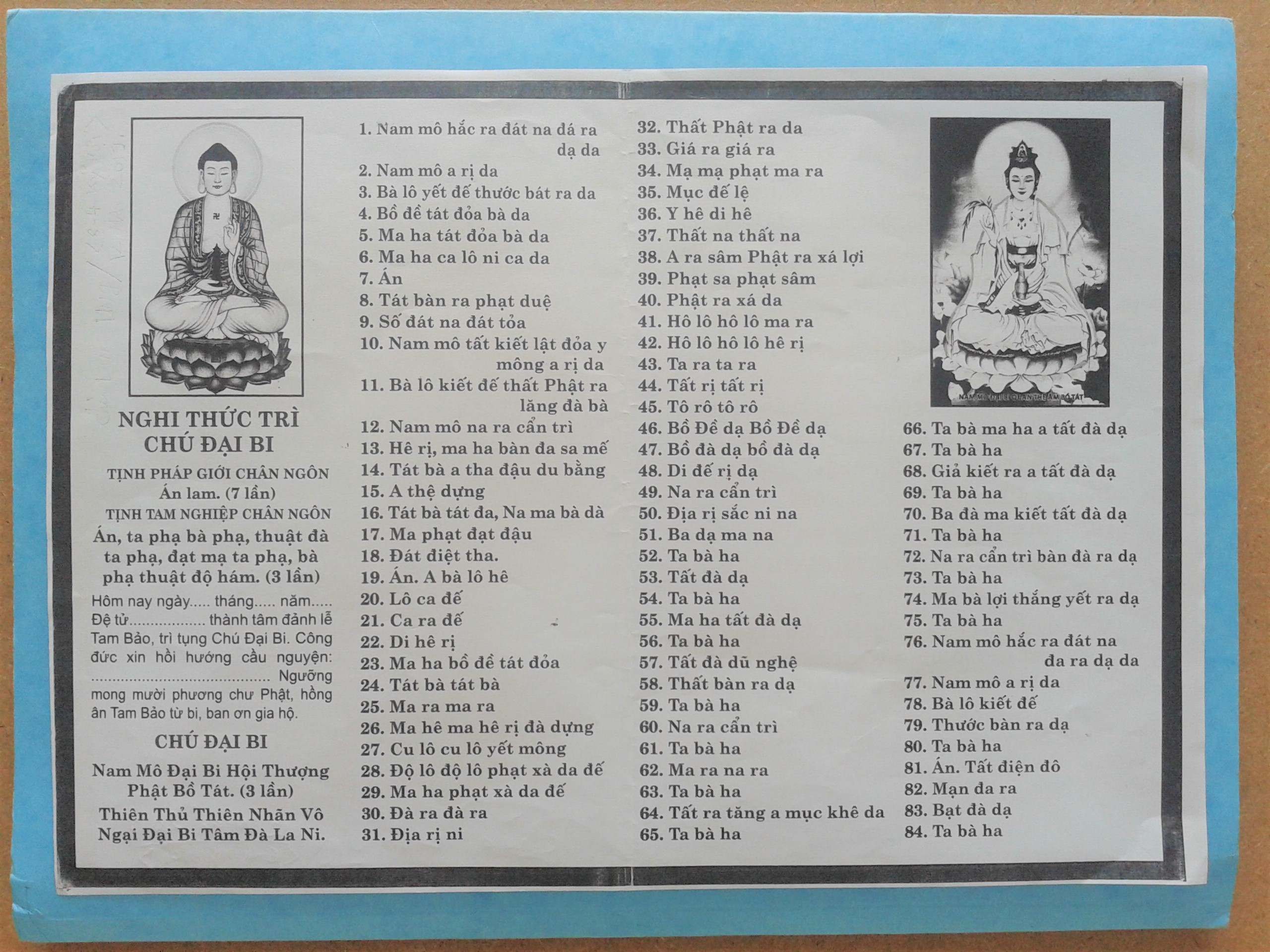
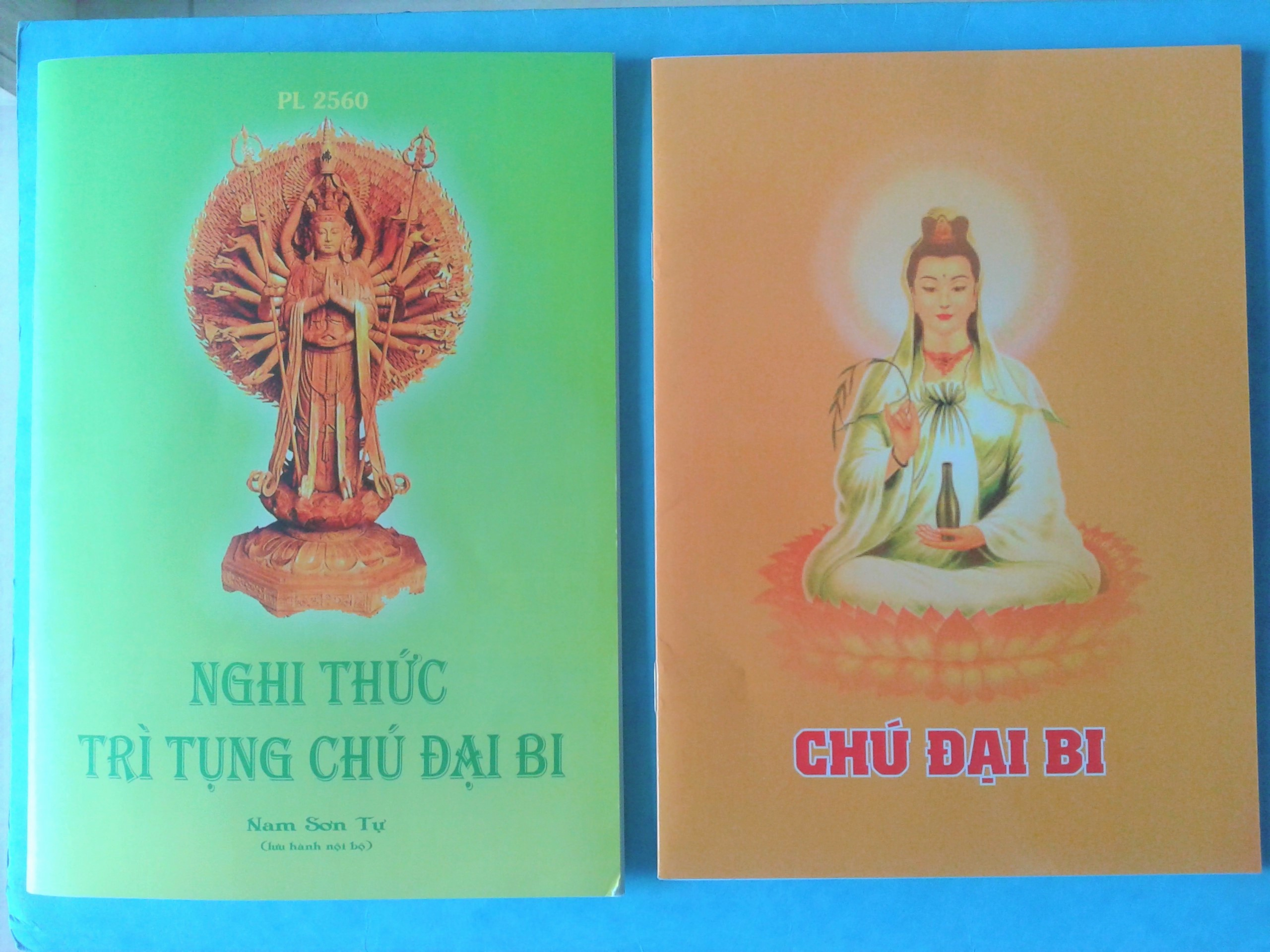
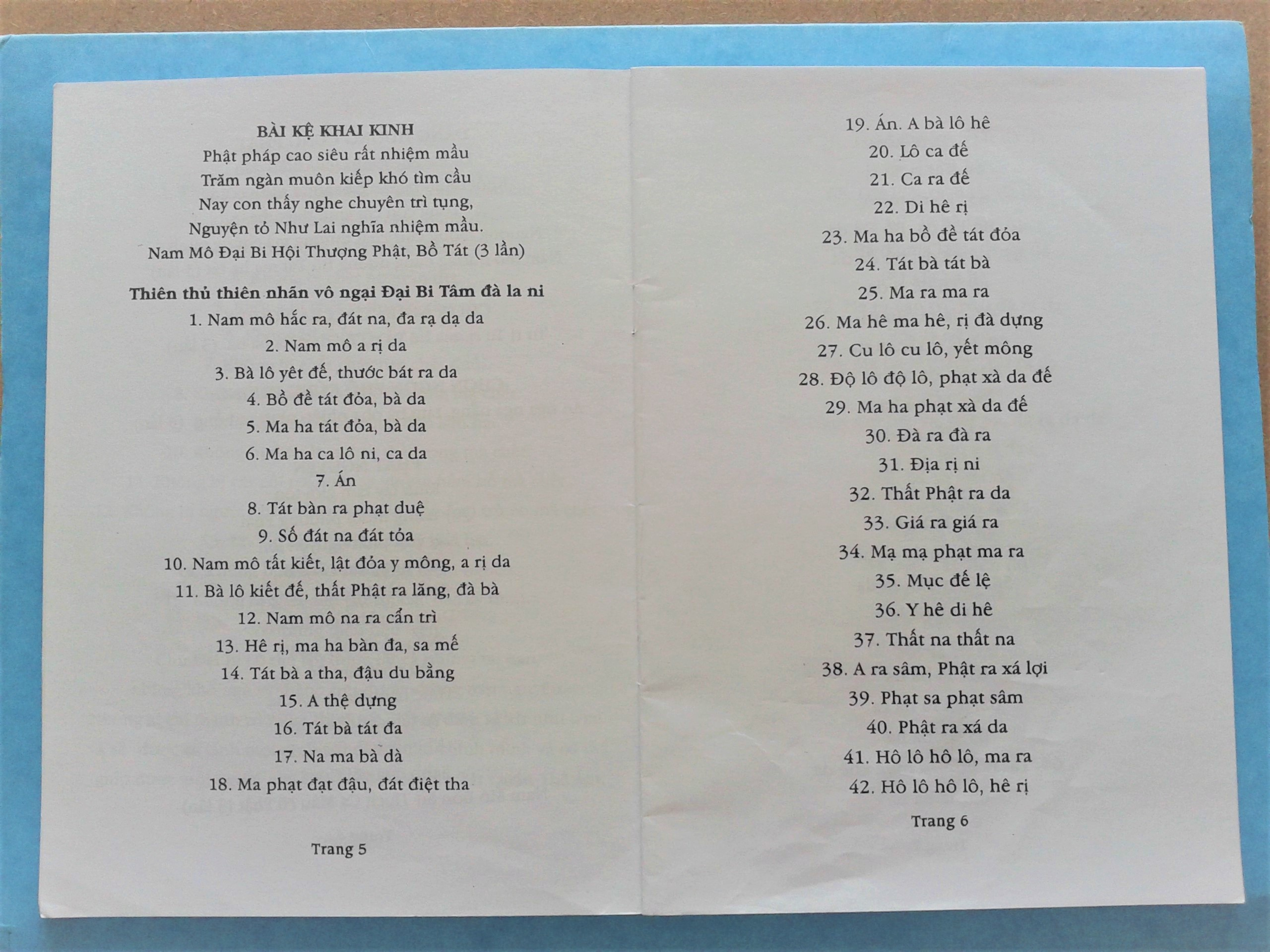
Description of illustrations:
• Left: Sheet of plain paper (21x29.7 cm). Complete text of Chú Đại Bi, ie 84 verses, printed in black and white. At the top of the page, on both sides, are the representations of Buddha A Di Đà (Amitābha) and Bodhisattva Quán Âm (Guanyin).
• Center: Two booklets, first covers, flexible cardboard (21x14.5 cm). - Green colored copy , 32 p. : Quan Âm (or Quán Thế Âm Bồ Tát) is standing on a lotus. She is represented in her form with twenty-four arms and eleven faces: hers, the others symbolizing the ten directions of space (the four cardinal directions, the four intercardinal directions, the nadir and the zenith, that the Boddhisattva can observe simultaneously.)
The meaning (and not the literal translation) of the words " Nghi Thức Trì Tụng " is: " Instructions for reciting well the Chú Đại Bi".
• Right: An open booklet. We can read the numbered verses 1-42 of the "Chú Đại Bi", that is to say half of the full text.
Note : one of the booklets has more pages (32) than the other (12) because it is more illustrated and contains ritual instructions (as indicated on the front cover).

| Click on images to enlarge |

== Texts and translations ==
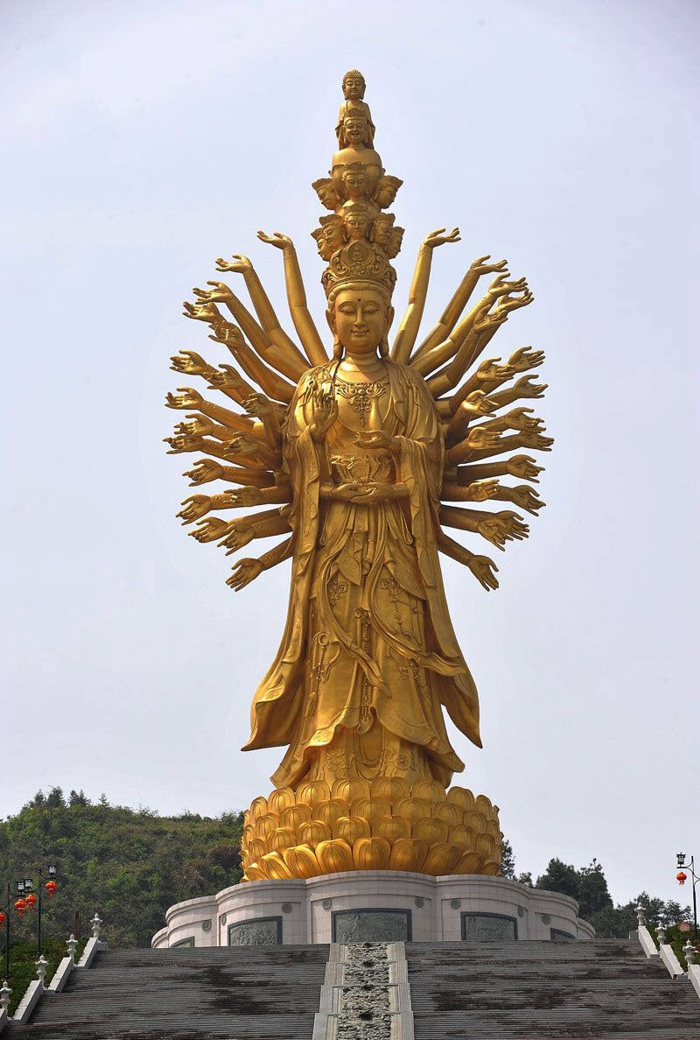
The Guishan Guanyin of the Thousand Hands and Eyes in Changsha, Hunan, China.

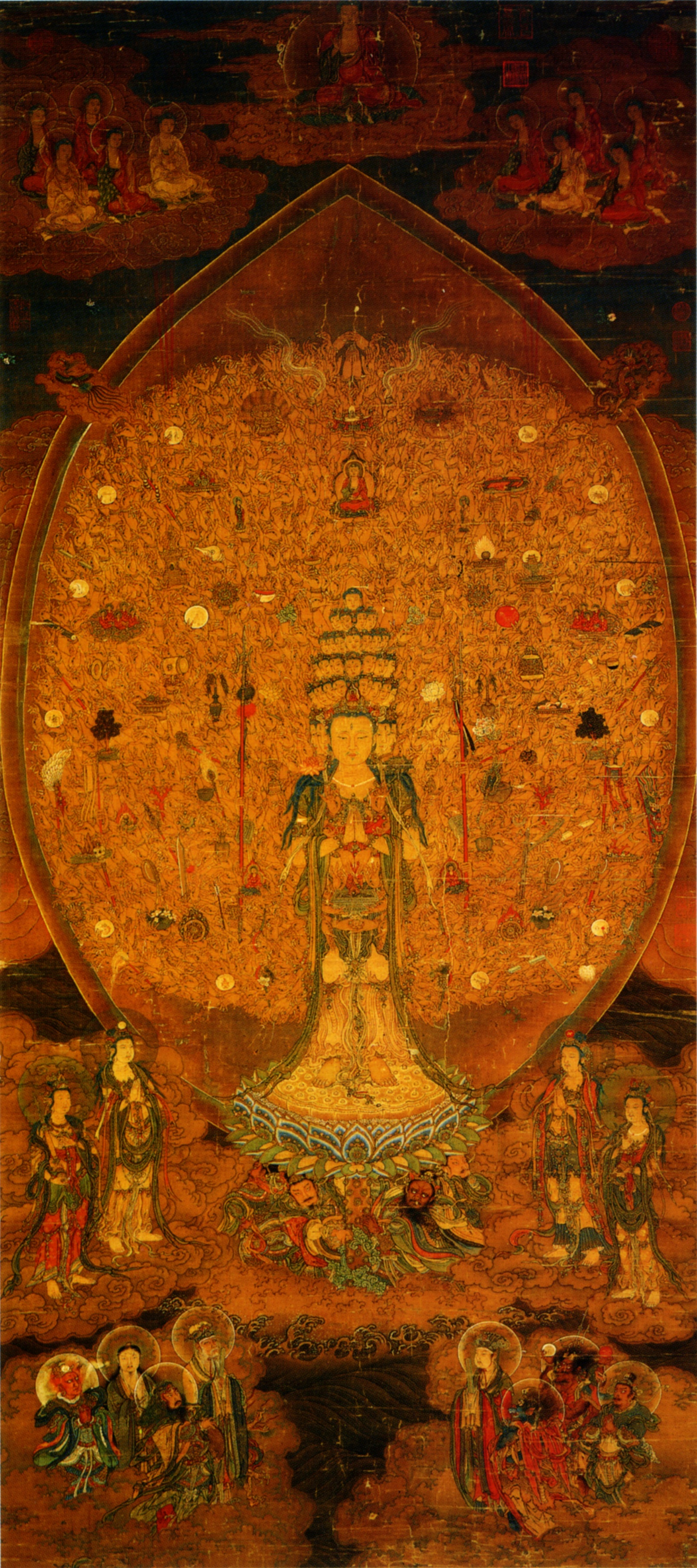
Song dynasty (960-1279) painting of the Thousand-Armed Guanyin (Qianshou Guanyin). Guanyin is depicted with a total of 32 heads, with the topmost head being that of the Buddha Amitābha. She stands atop a lotus pedestal supported by the Four Heavenly Kings with two attendant bodhisattvas flanking her on each side, while the Eight Legions of Devas and Nāgas stand before her with their hands clasped in reverence. A group of Buddhas sit in the clouds above. Ink and colors on silk. 79.2 x 176.8 cm. Held at the National Palace Museum in Taiwan.

There are numerous versions and editions of the Great Compassion Mantra (Dàbēi Zhòu). The different editions vary by length, content, and the way they are pronounced and written. Its textual history is characterized by a transition from early Indian Sanskrit origins to multiple Chinese and Tibetan recensions, primarily classified into "shorter" and "longer" versions. The mantra is unique for its syncretic nature, as it incorporates various epithets and attributes typically associated with Indian deities. The main versions of the dhāraṇī can be traced back to several key translators during the Tang Dynasty, who introduced the text to China from India and Central Asia.

Key translators include Bhagavaddharma, Vajrabodhi and Amoghavajra. The shorter version by Bhagavaddharma is the most pervasive in contemporary practice. In contrast, the longer versions, such as those preserved by Amoghavajra or found in the Tibetan Kangyur, contain additional invocations and more detailed descriptions of Avalokiteśvara's various forms. Modern practitioners also encounter a third category: the popular Sanskrit reconstructions made famous by 20th-century scholars like Lokesh Chandra. These versions aim to restore the classical Sanskrit phonetics that were often obscured by the phonetic constraints of Chinese characters. While these scholarly versions are widely used in modern musical recordings and international Buddhist gatherings, traditional lineages often maintain the older, transliterated Chinese or Tibetan pronunciations.

=== The short text ===
Besides some differences in dividing the text and a few (very minor) variances in wording, the Chinese, Vietnamese and Japanese versions of the dhāraṇī are substantially the same, being based either on the short version by Bhagavaddharma (T. 1060) and/or a similar rendition of the short text by Amoghavajra (T. 1113b). (Note: A rendition of the dhāraṇī by Joan Halifax and Kazuaki Tanahashi, based on interpretations by Japanese authors Shūyō Takubo (1960), and Tomoyasu Takenaka (1998), is as follows: "Homage to the Three Treasures. Homage to noble Avalokitesvara, noble Bodhisattva Mahasattva, who embodies great compassion. Om. Homage to you, who protects all those who are fearful. Being one with you, the Blue-necked noble Avalokitesvara, I bring forth your radiant heart that grants all wishes, overcomes obstacles, and purifies delusion. Here is the mantra: Om. You are luminous with shining wisdom. You transcend the world. O, Lion King, great Bodhisattva. Remember, remember, this heart. Act, act. Realize, realize. Continue, continue. Victor, great victor. Maintain, maintain. Embodiment of freedom. Arise, arise, the immaculate one, the undefiled being. Advance, advance. You are supreme on this earth. You remove the harm of greed. You remove the harm of hatred. You remove the harm of delusion. Lion King, remove, remove all defilements. The universal lotus grows from your navel. Act, act. Cease, cease. Flow, flow. Awake, awake. Compassionate one, enlighten, enlighten. Blue-necked One, you bring joy to those who wish to see clearly. Svaha. You succeed. Svaha. You greatly succeed. Svaha. You have mastered the practice. Svaha. Blue-necked one. Svaha. Boar-faced one, lion-faced one. Svaha. You hold the lotus. Svaha. You hold the blade wheel. Svaha. You liberate through the sound of the conch. Svaha. You hold a great staff. Svaha. You are the dark conqueror abiding near the left shoulder. Svaha. You wear a tiger skin. Svaha. Homage to the Three Treasures. Homage to noble Avalokiteshvara. Svaha. Realize all the phrases of this mantra. Svaha.")

The form of the dhāraṇī as commonly written and recited in Chinese Buddhism is as follows. The Chinese characters are a transcription, not a translation, of the Sanskrit. For example, in the first line 喝囉怛那·哆囉夜耶 hēlàdánà·duōlàyèyé transliterates the Sanskrit ratna-trayāya (three treasures) but "three treasures" would be translated as 三寶 sānbǎo.

(Traditional)

南無喝囉怛那哆囉夜耶 南無阿唎耶 婆盧羯帝爍缽囉耶 菩提薩埵婆耶 摩訶薩埵婆耶 摩訶迦盧尼迦耶 唵 薩皤囉罰曳 數怛那怛寫 南無悉吉慄埵伊蒙阿唎耶 婆盧吉帝室佛囉愣馱婆 南無那囉謹墀 醯利摩訶皤哆沙咩 薩婆阿他豆輸朋 阿逝孕 薩婆薩哆那摩婆薩哆那摩婆伽 摩罰特豆 怛姪他 唵阿婆盧醯 盧迦帝 迦羅帝 夷醯唎 摩訶菩提薩埵 薩婆薩婆 摩囉摩囉 摩醯摩醯唎馱孕 俱盧俱盧羯蒙 度盧度盧罰闍耶帝 摩訶罰闍耶帝 陀囉陀囉 地唎尼 室佛囉耶 遮囉遮囉 摩麼罰摩囉 穆帝隸 伊醯伊醯 室那室那 阿囉參佛囉舍利 罰沙罰參 佛囉舍耶 呼嚧呼嚧摩囉 呼嚧呼嚧醯利 娑囉娑囉 悉唎悉唎 蘇嚧蘇嚧 菩提夜菩提夜 菩馱夜菩馱夜 彌帝唎夜 那囉謹墀 地利瑟尼那 波夜摩那 娑婆訶 悉陀夜 娑婆訶 摩訶悉陀夜 娑婆訶 悉陀喻藝 室皤囉耶 娑婆訶 那囉謹墀 娑婆訶 摩囉那囉 娑婆訶 悉囉僧阿穆佉耶 娑婆訶 娑婆摩訶阿悉陀夜 娑婆訶 者吉囉阿悉陀夜 娑婆訶 波陀摩羯悉陀夜 娑婆訶 那囉謹墀皤伽囉耶 娑婆訶 摩婆利勝羯囉夜 娑婆訶 南無喝囉怛那哆囉夜耶 南無阿唎耶 婆嚧吉帝 爍皤囉夜 娑婆訶 唵悉殿都漫多囉跋陀耶娑婆訶

(Simplified)

南无喝囉怛那哆囉夜耶 南无阿唎耶 婆卢羯帝烁钵啰耶 菩提萨埵婆耶 摩诃萨埵婆耶 摩诃迦卢尼迦耶 唵 萨皤囉罚曳 数怛那怛写 南无悉吉栗埵伊蒙阿唎耶 婆卢吉帝室佛啰愣驮婆 南无那囉谨墀 醯利摩诃皤哆沙咩 萨婆阿他豆输朋 阿逝孕 萨婆萨哆那摩婆萨哆那摩婆伽 摩罚特豆 怛姪他 唵阿婆卢醯 卢迦帝 迦罗帝 夷醯唎 摩诃菩提萨埵 萨婆萨婆 摩啰摩啰 摩醯摩醯唎驮孕 俱卢俱卢羯蒙 度卢度卢罚闍耶帝 摩诃罚闍耶帝 陀啰陀啰 地唎尼 室佛啰耶 遮啰遮啰 摩么罚摩啰 穆帝隶 伊醯伊醯 室那室那 阿啰参佛啰舍利 罚沙罚参 佛啰舍耶 呼嚧呼嚧摩啰 呼嚧呼嚧醯利 娑囉娑囉 悉唎悉唎 苏嚧苏嚧 菩提夜菩提夜 菩驮夜菩驮夜 弥帝唎夜 那囉谨墀 地利瑟尼那 波夜摩那 娑婆诃 悉陀夜 娑婆诃 摩诃悉陀夜 娑婆诃 悉陀喻艺 室皤囉耶 娑婆诃 那囉谨墀 娑婆诃 摩啰那囉 娑婆诃 悉啰僧阿穆佉耶 娑婆诃 娑婆摩诃阿悉陀夜 娑婆诃 者吉啰阿悉陀夜 娑婆诃 波陀摩羯悉陀夜 娑婆诃 那囉谨墀皤伽囉耶 娑婆诃 摩婆利胜羯啰夜 娑婆诃 南无喝囉怛那哆囉夜耶 南无阿唎耶 婆嚧吉帝 烁皤囉夜 娑婆诃 唵悉殿都漫多啰跋陀耶娑婆诃

(Pinyin) (Note: 囉 is read as la; 婆 is read as wó; 訶 is read as hā)

Nāmo hēlàdánà duōlàyèyé. Nāmo alīyé. Pólújiédì. Shuòbōlàyé. Pútísàduǒpóyé. Móhāsàduǒpóyé. Móhājiālúníjiāyé. Ǎn. Sàbólàfáyì. Shùdană dáxiĕ. Nāmo xījílí duǒyīmēng alīyé. Pólújiédì shìfólà. Léngtuópó. Nāmo nălàjĭnchí. Xīlīmóhā bóduōshāmiē. Sàpó atādòu shūpéng. Āshìyùn. Sàpósàduō nămó pósàduō nămó póqié. Mófá tèdòu. Dázhítā. Ǎn apólúxī. Lújiādì. Jiāluódì. Yíxīlī. Móhā pútísàduǒ. Sàpó sàpó. Mólà mólà. Móxī móxī lītuóyùn. Jùlú jùlú jiéméng. Dùlú dùlú fáshéyédì. Móhā fáshéyédì. Tuólà tuólà. Dìlīní. Shìfólàyē. Zhēlà zhēlà. Mómó fámólà. Mùdìlì. Yīxī yīxī. Shìnă shìnă. Ālàshēn fólàshělì. Fáshā fáshēn. Fólàshěyé. Hūlú hūlú mólà. Hūlú hūlú xīlī. Suōlà suōlà. Xīlī xīlī. Sūlú sūlú. Pútíyè pútíyè. Pútuóyè pútuóyè. Mídìlīyè. Nălàjĭnchí. Dìlī sènínà. Pōyèmónà. Suōpóhā. Xītuóyè. Suōpóhā. Móhā xītuóyè. Suōpóhā. Xītuóyùyì. Shìbólàyè. Suōpóhā. Nălàjĭnchí. Suōpóhā. Mólà nălà. Suōpóhā. Xīlàsēng amùqūyé. Suōpóhā. Suōpó móhā axītuóyé. Suōpóhā. Zhějílà axītuóyè. Suōpóhā. Bōtuómó jiéxītuóyè. Suōpóhā. Nălàjĭnchí bóqiélàyé. Suōpóhā. Mópólì shèngjiélàyè. Suōpóhā. Nāmo hēlàdánà duōlàyèyé. Nāmo alīyé. Pólújídì. Shuōbólàyè. Suōpóhā. Ǎn xīdiàndū. Mànduōlà. Bátuóyé. Suōpóhā.

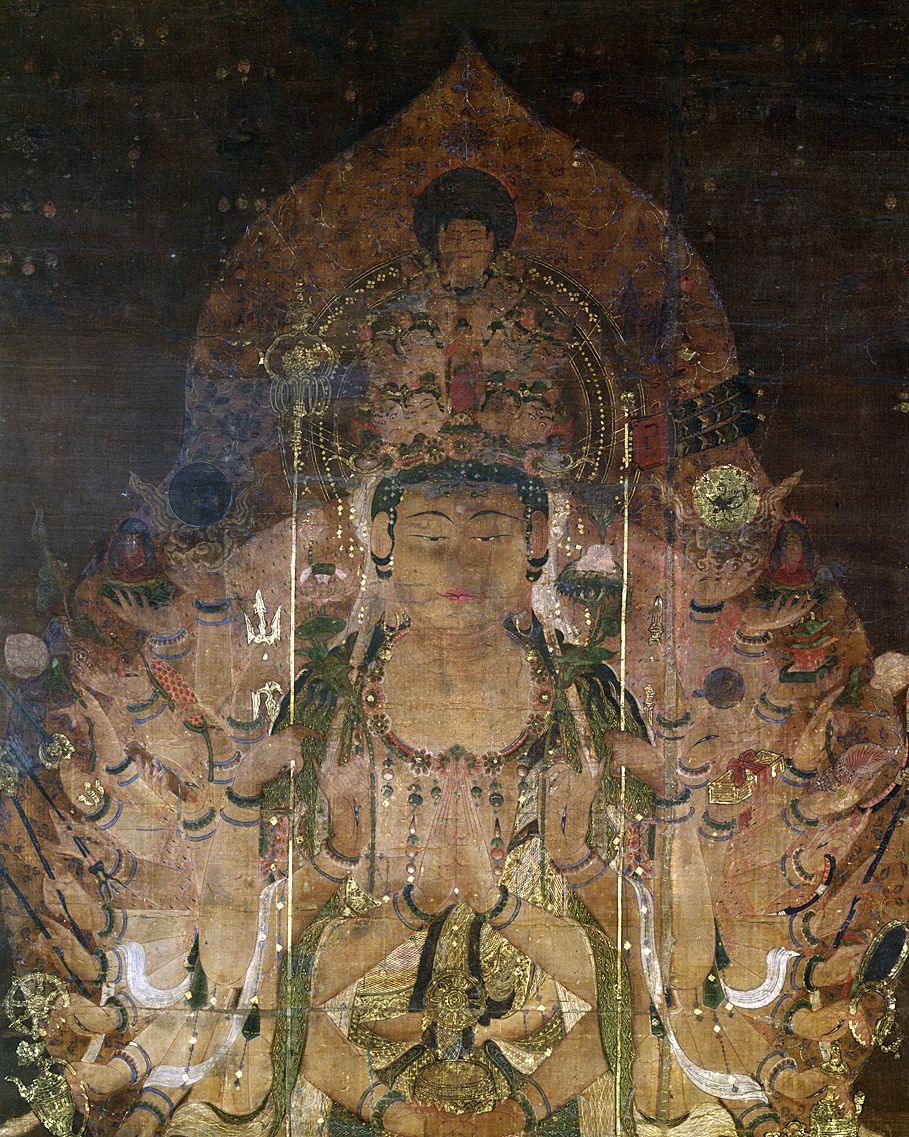
Detail of a 12th-century depiction of the thousand-armed Avalokiteśvara (Senju Kannon) located at the Tokyo National Museum

==== Reconstructed Sanskrit text of Bhagavaddharma's version ====
The following is a reconstruction of the original Sanskrit text of Bhagavaddharma's version by Lokesh Chandra (1988) based on a comparison with other versions.

Namo ratna trayāya | namo āryĀvalokiteśvarāya bodhisattvāya mahāsattvāya mahākāruṇikāya |

Oṃ sarva-bhayeṣu trāṇa-karāya tasya namaskṛtvā imaṃ āryĀvalokiteśvara-stavanaṃ Nīlakaṇṭha-nāma |

Hṛdayaṃ vartayiṣyāmi sarv-ārtha-sādhanaṃ śubhaṃ |
ajeyaṃ sarva-bhūtānāṃ bhava-mārga -viśodhakam ||

TADYATHĀ | Oṃ apaloka lokātikrānta ehi Hare mahābodhisattva sarpa-sarpa | smara smara mama hṛdayam | kuru-kuru karma | dhuru-dhuru vijayate mahāvijayate | dhara-dhara dharāṇi-rāja | cala-cala mama vimala-mūrtte re | ehy-ehi kṛṣṇa-sarp-opavīta | viṣa-viṣaṃ praṇāśaya | hulu-hulu malla | hulu-hulu Hare | sara-sara siri-siri suru-suru | bodhiya-bodhiya bodhaya-bodhaya maitriya Nīlakaṇṭha | darśanena prahlādaya manaḥ svāhā | siddhāya svāhā | mahāsiddhāya svāhā | siddha-yogeśvarāya svāhā | Nīlakaṇṭhāya svāhā | Vāraha-mukhāya svāhā | Narasiṃha-mukhāya svāhā | padma-hastāya svāhā | cakra-hastāya svāhā | padma-hastāya? svāhā | Nīlakaṇṭha-vyāghrāya svāhā | Mahābali-Śankarāya svāhā || Namo ratna-trayāya | namo āryĀvalokiteśvarāya svāhā ||

(Oṃ siddhyantu mantra-padāni svāhā ||)

Chandra's English translation is:

1. Adoration to the Triple Gem. Adoration to ārya Avalokiteśvarā, bodhisattva, mahāsattva, the Great Compassionate One. Oṃ. Having paid adoration to One who protects in all dangers, here is the [recitation] of the names of Nīlakaṇṭha, as chanted by ārya Avalokiteśvarā.

2. I shall enunciate the 'heart' [dhāraṇī] which ensures all aims, is pure and invincible for all beings, and which purifies the path of existence.

3. THUS. Oṃ. O Effulgence, World-Transcendent, come, oh Hari, the great bodhisattva, descend, descend. Bear in mind my heart-dhāraṇī. Accomplish, accomplish the work. Hold fast, hold fast, Victor, oh Great Victor. Hold on, hold on, oh Lord of the Earth. Move, move, oh my Immaculate Image. Come, come, Thou with the black serpent as Thy sacred thread. Destroy every poison. Quick, quick, oh Strong Being. Quick, Quick, oh Hari. Descend, descend, come down, come down, condescend, condescend. Being enlightened enlighten me, oh merciful Nīlakaṇṭha. Gladden my heart by appearing unto me.

To the Siddha hail. To the Great Siddha hail. To the Lord of Siddha Yogins hail. To Nīlakaṇṭha hail. To the Boar-faced One hail. To the One with the face of Narasiṃha hail. To One who has a lotus in His hand hail. To the Holder of a cakra in His hand hail. To One who sports a lotus(?) in His hand hail. To Nīlakaṇṭha the tiger hail. To the mighty Śaṇkara hail.

4. Adoration to the Triple Gem. Adoration to ārya Avalokiteśvarā, hail.

===== Analysis =====
While the most commonly used version in East Asia, the shorter version of the dhāraṇī as transcribed by Bhagavaddharma has been criticized as an imperfect rendering based on a defective recitation or manuscript copy. Amoghavajra's Siddhaṃ text in T. 1113b is also badly corrupted. In addition to the use of the Central Asian form 'Narakindi'/'Nilakandi'/'Narakidhi' (那囉謹墀) for Sanskrit Nīlakaṇṭha and other grammatical quirks which betray a Central Asian milieu, certain other portions of the standard text are corrupt beyond recognition.

For instance, the passage 室那室那 阿囉嘇佛囉舍利 (Siddhaṃ text of T. 1113b: cinda 2 arṣam pracali), is thought to be a corruption of kṛṣṇa-sarpopavīta "thou with the black serpent as the sacred thread" (attested in other versions and hinted in Amoghavajra's commentary in T. 1111), with the word for 'serpent' (सर्प sarpa) as written in Siddhaṃ script being misread as 2 arsa. Meanwhile, 薩婆菩哆那摩縛伽摩罰特豆 (T. 1113b: sarva-bhutanama vagama vadudu) is a misrendering of sarva-bhūtānām bhava-mārga visodhakam ("(it) cleanses the path of existence of all beings"), with dudu (特豆) being a filler word to cover a portion of the text that was not perceived clearly.

=== Longer version ===
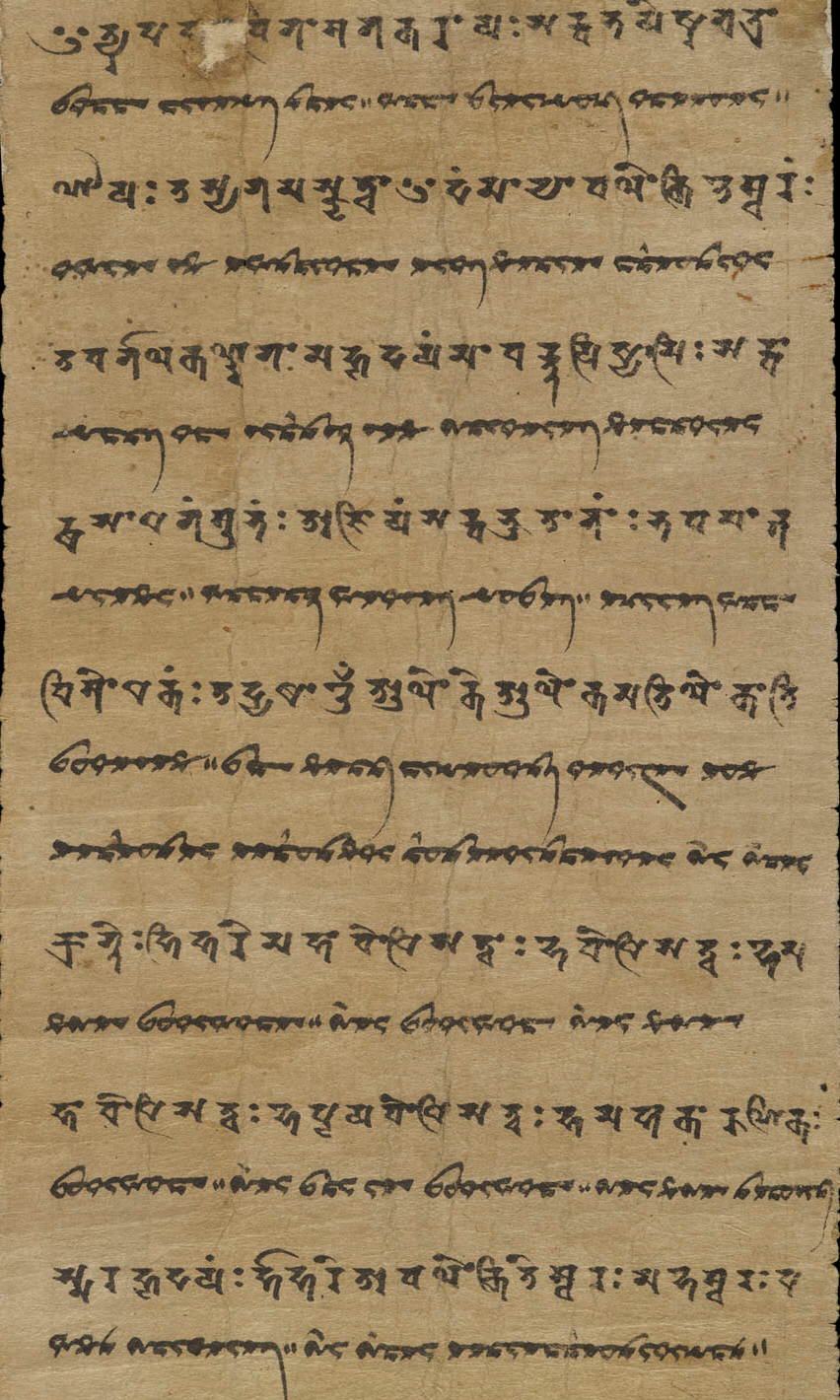
Part of an 8th-century manuscript of the longer version of the Nīlakaṇṭha Dhāraṇī from Dunhuang (British Library, Or.8212/175), written in both late Brahmi/Siddhaṃ and Sogdian scripts.

==== Vajrabodhi (Taishō Tripiṭaka 1061) ====
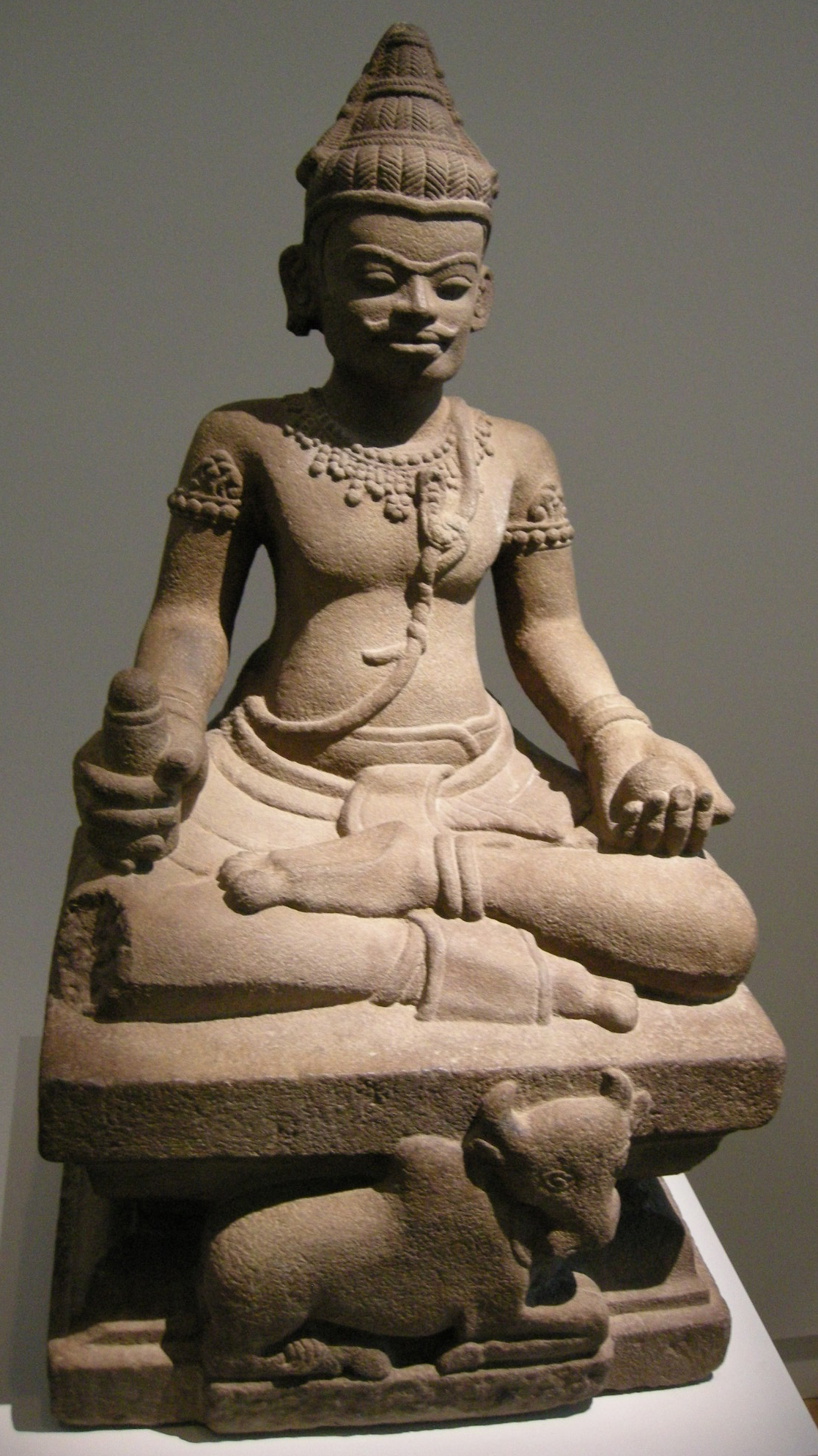
A Champa depiction of Shiva dating from the 9th-10th century. Note the serpent hanging from Shiva's left shoulder serving as his upavita (sacred thread). The dhāraṇī describes Nīlakaṇṭha as kṛṣṇa-sarpopavīta or kṛṣṇa-sarpa-kṛta-yajñopavīta, "one who has made the black serpent into a yajñopavīta."

Vajrabodhi's Sanskrit text as reconstructed by Chandra (1988):

Namo ratna-trayāya | nama āryĀvalokiteśvarāya bodhisattvāya mahāsattvāya mahākāruṇikāya sarva-bandhana-cchedana-karāya sarva-bhava-samudra-śoṣaṇa-karāya sarva-vyādhi-praśamana-karāya sarv-ety-upadrava-vināśana-karāya sarva-bhayeṣu trāṇa-karāya | tasmai namaskṛtvā imaṃ āryĀvalokiteśvara-bhāṣitaṃ Nīlakaṇṭha-nāma |

hṛdayaṃ vartayiṣyāmi sarv-ārtha-sādhakaṃ śubhaṃ |
ajeyaṃ sarva-bhutānāṃ bhava-mārga-viśodhakaṃ ||

TADYATHĀ | oṃ āloka e āloka-mati lokātikrānta ehi Hare āryĀvalokiteśvara mahābodhisattva | he bodhisattva he mahābodhisattva he virya-bodhisattva he mahākāruṇikā smara hṛdayaṃ | ehy-ehi Hare āryĀvalokiteśvara Maheśvara paramārtha-citta mahākāruṇikā | kuru-kuru karma | sādhaya-sādhaya vidyam | dehi-dehi tvaraṃ kāmam gama vihaṇgama vigama siddha-yogeśvara | dhuru-dhuru viyanta e mahā-viyanta e | dhara-dhara dharendreśvara | cala-cala vimal-āmala āryĀvalokiteśvara Jina | kṛṣṇa-jaṭā-makuṭā 'varama prarama virama mahāsiddha-vidyādhara | bala-bala mahābala malla-malla mahāmalla cala cala Mahācala | kṛṣṇa-varṇa dīrgha-kṛṣṇa-pakṣa-nirghātana he padma-hasta | cara cara niśācareśvara kṛṣṇa-sarpa-kṛta-yajñopavīta | ehy-ehi mahāVarāha-mukha Tripura-dahan-eśvara Nārāyaṇa-balopabala-veśa-dhara | he Nīlakaṇṭha he Mahākāla halāhala-viṣa nirjita lokasya rāga-viṣa vināśana dveṣa-viṣa-vināśana moha-viṣa-viṇāśana hulu-hulu malla | hulu Hare Mahā-Padmanābha | sara-sara siri-siri suru-suru muru-muru budhya-budhya bodhaya-bodhaya bodhayā maitriya Nīlakaṇṭha | ehy-ehi vāma-sthita-Siṃha-mukha | hasa-hasa muñca-muñca mahāṭṭahāsam | ehy-ehi bho mahāsiddha-yogeśvara | bhaṇa-bhaṇa vācaṃ | sādhaya-sādhaya vidyāṃ | smara-smara taṃ bhagavantaṃ lokita-vilokitaṃ Lokeśvaram tathāgataṃ | dadāhi me darśana-kāmasya darśanam | prahlādaya manaḥ svāhā |
siddhāya svāhā | mahāsiddhāya svāhā | siddha-yogeśvarāya svāhā | Nīlakaṇṭhāya svāhā | Varāha-mukhāya svāhā | MahāNarasiṃha-mukhāya svāhā | siddha-vidyādharāya svāhā | padma-hastāya svāhā | kṛṣṇa-sarpa-kṛta-yajñopavitāya svāhā | mahā-Lakuṭadharāya svāhā | cakr-āyudhāya svāhā | śaṇkha-śabda-nibodhanāya svāhā | vāma-skandha-deśa-sthita-kṛṣṇ-ājināya svāhā | vyāghra-carma-nivasanāya svāhā | Lokeśvarāya svāhā | sarva-siddheśvaraya svāhā |
Namo bhagavate āryĀvalokiteśvarāya bodhisattvāya mahāsattvāya mahākāruṇikāya |

Siddhyantu me mantra-padāni svāhā ||

===== Analysis =====
As noted above, the longer version as preserved by Vajrabodhi provides evidence that the dhāraṇī, in its original form, was a recitation of Nīlakaṇṭha's names by Avalokiteśvara (Āryāvalokiteśvara-bhāṣitaṃ Nīlakaṇṭha-nāma "the names of Nīlakaṇṭha uttered (bhāṣita) by ārya Avalokiteśvara"), suggesting that the two figures were not yet conflated with each other at this stage. This version also contains more epithets associated with Shiva and Vishnu than the standard shorter version, such as Maheśvara, Mahākāla, Tripura-dahaneśvara, Mahācala ("the great immovable (acala) one"), Lakuṭadhara ("the bearer of a club"; cf. Lakulisha), halāhala-viṣa nirjita ("subduer of the halāhala poison"), vyāghra-carma-nivasana ("he who wears a tiger skin"), Nārāyaṇa-balopabala-veśa-dhara ("having the prowess and vestments (veśa) of Nārāyaṇa"), Padmanābha ("the lotus-naveled"), or śaṇkha-śabda-nibodhana ("he who awakens (with the) sound of a conch").

== Comparison of various Sanskrit versions ==
The following Sanskrit texts are synoptically arranged for comparison:

1. The Sanskrit of Amoghavajra (T. 1113b; spelling as in the received text)
2. A fragmentary manuscript of the dhāraṇī from Dunhuang (Pelliot chinois 2778)
3. A reconstruction of the standard text of the dhāraṇī based on Bhagavaddharma and Amoghavajra by Lokesh Chandra (1988)
4. The underlying Sanskrit of the Korean version
5. The Sanskrit of Vajrabodhi (T. 1061; spelling as in the received text)
6. A (partial) transcription of the Sanskrit-Sogdian manuscript of the dhāraṇī from Dunhuang (Or. 8212/175; spelling as in the manuscript)
7. A reconstruction of the longer text of the dhāraṇī based on Vajrabodhi by Lokesh Chandra (1988)

| Shorter Version | | | | Longer Version | | |
| Amoghavajra (T. 1113b) | Dunhuang (MS. Pelliot chinois 2778) | Bhagavaddharma + Amoghavajra Reconstructed Text (Chandra) | Korean Text | Vajrabodhi (T. 1061) | Dunhuang (British Library, Or. 8212/175) | Constituted Text of Vajrabodhi (Chandra) |
|---|---|---|---|---|---|---|
| namo ratna-trayāya | namo ratna-trayāya | namo ratna-trayāya | namo ratna-trayāya | namo ratna-trayāya | ࿓[namo ratnatrayāya. | namo ratna-trayāya |
| nama āryāvalokiteśvarāya bodhisatvāya mahāsatvāya mahākāruṇikāya | namaḥ āryāvalokiteśvarāya bodhisatvāya mahāsatvāya mahākāruṇikāya | nama āryĀvalokiteśvarāya bodhisattvāya mahāsattvāya mahākāruṇikāya | nama āryāvalokiteśvarāya bodhisattvāya mahāsattvāya mahākāruṇikāya | namaḥ āryāvalokiteśvarāya bodhisatvāya mahāsatvāya mahākāruṇikāya | nama āryāvalokite śvarāya. bodhi satvāya. mahā satvāya. mahā kāruṇikā]ya. | nama āryĀvalokiteśvarāya bodhisattvāya mahāsattvāya mahākāruṇikāya |
| | | | | sarva-bandhana-cchedana-karāya sarva-bhava-samudraṃ sukṣaṇa-karāya sarva-vyadhi-praśamana-karāya sarvetityubhandrava-vināśana-karāya | sarva baṃndhana cchedana karāya. sarva bhava samuṣre ccheṣaṇa karāya. sarva vyadhi praśamana karāya. sarva ityu padrava vināśana karāya. | sarva-bandhana-cchedana-karāya sarva-bhava-samudra-śoṣaṇa-karāya sarva-vyādhi-praśamana-karāya sarv-ety-upadrava-vināśana-karāya |
| oṃ sarva-bhayeṣu dhana dasya namoskṛta īmo āryābarukiteśvaraṃ dhava namo narakidhi | oṃ(auṃ¿) sarva bhayeṣu trālākaraya tasya me nama skṛtvā imam̐ āryāvalokite śvara tava nīlakāṇṭha nama | oṃ sarva-bhayeṣu trāṇa-karāya tasya namaskṛtvā imaṃ āryāvalokiteśvara-stavanaṃ Nīlakaṇṭha-nāma | oṃ sarva-bhayeṣu trāṇa-karāya tasmai namaskṛtvā imaṃ āryāvalokiteśvara-stavaṃ Nīlakaṇṭha-nāma | sarva-bhayeṣyo trāṇa-karāya tasmai namaskṛtvā inamāryāvalokiteśvara-bhāṣitaṃ nirakaṃṭabhe-nāma | sarva bhayeṣu nratrāṇāya. tasya namaskṛtvā idaṃ māryāvalokiteśvaraṃ. bhava nīlakaṇḍa nāma | sarva-bhayeṣu trāṇa-karāya tasmai namaskṛtvā imaṃ āryĀvalokiteśvara-bhāṣitaṃ Nīlakaṇṭha-nāma | |
| herima vadhaṣame sarva-athadu śutuṃ | hṛdaya māvartta yiṣyāmi sarvārtha sādhanaṃ śrūtaṃ | hṛdayaṃ vartayiṣyāmi sarvārtha-sādhanaṃ śubhaṃ | hṛdayaṃ vartayiṣyāmi sarvārtha-sādhanaṃ śubhaṃ | hṛdayama vratayicchyāmi sarvātha-sadhakaṃ śuvaṃ | hṛdayaṃ māvartta yiṣyāmi. sarvārtha sādhanaṃ śubhaṃ. | hṛdayaṃ vartayiṣyāmi sarv-ārtha-sādhakaṃ śubhaṃ |
| ajeyaṃ sarva-bhutanama vaga ma va dudu | ajiyaṃ sarva bhūtanāṃ bhavamā | ajeyaṃ sarva-bhutānāṃ bhava-mārga-viśodhakam | ajeyaṃ sarva-bhutānāṃ bhava-mara-viśodhakaṃ | ajiyaṃ sarva-bhutānāṃ bhava-marga-viśuddhakaṃ | ajiyaṃ sarva bhūtānāṃ. bhava mārga viśodhakaṃ. | ajeyaṃ sarva-bhutānāṃ bhava-mārga-viśodhakaṃ |
| TADYATHĀ | | TADYATHĀ | TADYATHĀ | TADYATHĀ | tadyathā | TADYATHĀ |
| oṃ avaloka lokāte karate e hṛe mahābodhisatva sarva2 | | oṃ apaloka lokātikrānta ehi Hare mahābodhisattva sarpa-sarpa | oṃ āloke ( = āloka e) āloka-mati lokātikrānta ehy-ehi Hare mahābodhisattva | oṃ āloke āloka-mati lokātikraṃte he hare āryāvalokiteśvara mahābodhisatva | Oṃ āloke āloka mati lokāti krānte. hihare mahā bodhisatvā. | oṃ āloka e āloka-mati lokātikrānta ehi Hare āryĀvalokiteśvara mahābodhisattva |
| | | | | he bodhisatva he mahāvodhisatva he viryabodhisatva he mahākāruṇikā | he bodhisatva. he mahā bodhisatva. he pṛya bodhisatva. he mahā kārūṇika. | he bodhisattva he mahābodhisattva he virya-bodhisattva he mahākāruṇikā |
| mala2 mama hṛedayaṃ | | smara smara mama hṛdayam | smara smara hṛdayam | smīra hṛdayaṃ | smara hṛdayaṃ. | smara hṛdayaṃ |
| | | | hi hi hare āryāvalokiteśvara maheśvara parama-maitra-citta mahākāruṇikā | hi hi hare āryāvalokiteśvara maheśvara paramatra-citta mahākāruṇikā | hīhare avalokite śvara. maheśvara. para maitra cita. mahā kāruṇika. | ehy-ehi Hare āryĀvalokiteśvara Maheśvara paramārtha-citta mahākāruṇikā |
| kuru2 karmaṃ | | kuru-kuru karma | kuru-kuru karma | kuru-kuru karmaṃ | kuru×2 karmaṃ. | kuru-kuru karma |
| | | | sādhaya-sādhaya | sadhaya-sadhaya viddhyaṃ | sādhaya×2 vidyāṃ | sādhaya-sādhaya vidyam |
| | | | dehi-dehi me varaṃ kamaṃ | ṇihe-ṇihe tavaraṃ kamaṃ | dehi dehi me varaṃ. kāma | dehi-dehi tvaraṃ kāmam |
| | | | | gama vigama siddha-yugeśvara | hgāmaṃ. vihaṃ hgāmaṃ viśa. siddhayogī śvara. | gama vihaṇgama vigama siddha-yogeśvara |
| dhuru2 vajayate mahāvajayate | | dhuru-dhuru vijayate mahāvijayate | dhuru-dhuru vijayate mahāvijayate | dhuru-dhuru viyatni mahāviyanti | dhuru×2 viyaṃnti mahā viyaṃnti. | dhuru-dhuru viyanta e mahā-viyanta e |
| dhara2 dhiriṇi-rāya | | dhara-dhara dharāṇi-rāja | dhara-dhara dharāṇiṃdhareśvara | dhara-dhara dhare indreśvara | dhara×2 dhare ndreśvara. | dhara-dhara dharendreśvara |
| cala-cala mama vamara-sukte le | | cala-cala mama vimala-mūṛtte re | cala-cala malla vimal-āmala-mūṛtte | cala-cala vimalamara | cala vimalā mala mūrtte. | cala-cala vimal-āmala |
| | | | | āryāvalokiteśvara jina kṛṣṇi-jaṭā-makuṭa varaṃma praraṃma viraṃma mahāsiddha-vidyadhara | āryāvalokite śvarā jīji kṛṣṇa jaṭe makuṭā valaṃmṛvā prala mbaṃ. mahā siddha vidyā dhara. | āryĀvalokiteśvara Jina kṛṣṇa-jaṭā-makuṭā 'varama prarama virama mahāsiddha-vidyādhara | |
| | | | | vara vara mahāvara | bala×2 mahā bala. | bala-bala mahābala |
| | | | | bala bala mahābala | mala×2 mahā mala. | malla-malla mahāmalla |
| | | | | cara cara mahācara | cala×2 mahā cala | cala cala Mahācala |
| | | | | kṛṣṇivṛṇa dīrgha kṛṣṇipakṣa dīrghatana | kṛṣṇa varṇa kṛṣṇa pakṣa. nirghātana. | kṛṣṇa-varṇa dīrgha-kṛṣṇa-pakṣa-nirghātana |
| | | | | he padmahasti | he padma hasta. | he padma-hasta |
| | | | | cara cara diśacaleśvara | cara×2 niśā care śvara. | cara cara niśācareśvara |
| ehe-ehe cinda2 arṣam pracali | | ehy-ehi kṛṣṇa-sarp-opavīta | ehy-ehi Lokeśvara | kṛṣṇi-sarapa-kṛta-yajyopavita ehy-ehe mahā-varaha-mukha | kṛṣṇa sarpa kṛtaya jṇopa vīta. ehyahi mahā varāha mukha. | kṛṣṇa-sarpa-kṛta-yajñopavīta ehy-ehi mahāVarāha-mukha |
| | | | | tripūra-dahaneśvara narayaṇa-varupa-vara-marga-ari | mahā tṛpura dahane śvara. nārāyana rūpa bala vega dharī. | Tripura-dahan-eśvara Nārāyaṇa-balopabala-veśa-dhara |
| | | | | he nirakaṃṭa | he nīlakaṇḍa. | he Nīlakaṇṭha |
| | | | | he mahākāra harahara-viṣa-nirjita | he mahā hālā hala viṣa. nirjjotā | he Mahākāla hālāhala-viṣa nirjita |
| vaṣa-vaṣaṃ praśaya | | viṣa-viṣaṃ praṇāśaya | rāga-viṣaṃ viṇāśaya | lokasya rāga-viṣa-vināśana | lokasya rāga viṣa vināśana. | lokasya rāga-viṣa vināśana |
| | | | dveṣa-viṣaṃ viṇāśaya | dviṣa-viṣa-vināśana | dveṣa viṣa vināśana. | dveṣa-viṣa-vināśana |
| | | | moha-jāla-viṣaṃ viṇāśaya | muha-viṣa-vināśana | moha viṣa vināśana. | moha-viṣa-viṇāśana |
| huru2 mara | | hulu-hulu Malla | hulu-hulu malla | hulu-hulu mara | hulu×2 mālā | hulu-hulu malla |
| huru2 [hri] | | hulu-hulu Hare | hulu Hare Padmanābha | hulu hale mahā-padmanābha | huru. hara×2 mahā padma nābha. | hulu Hare Mahā-Padmanābha |
| sara2 siri2 suru2 | | sara-sara siri-siri suru-suru | sara-sara siri-siri suru-suru | sara-sara siri-siri suru-suru muru-muru | sara×2 siri×2 suru×2 | sara-sara siri-siri suru-suru muru-muru |
| bodhiya2 bodhaya2 maitriya Narakindi | | bodhiya-bodhiya bodhaya-bodhaya maitriya Nīlakaṇṭha | buddhya-buddhya bodhaya-bodhaya maitriya Nīlakaṇṭha | buddhya-buddhya boddhaya-boddhaya maite-nirakaṃṭa | budhya×2 bodhaya×2 bodhayā miti. nīlakaṇḍa. | budhya-budhya bodhaya-bodhaya bodhayā maitriya Nīlakaṇṭha |
| | | | | ehy-ehe mama sthita-syiṃha-mukha | ehyahi. vāma sthita siṃha mukha. | ehy-ehi vāma-sthita-Siṃha-mukha |
| | | | | hasa hasa muṃca muṃca mahāṭāṭahasaṃ | hasa×2 muṃca×2 mahā ṭāṭṭa hāsa. | hasa-hasa muñca-muñca mahāṭṭahāsam |
| | | | | ehy-ehe paṃ mahā siddha-yugeśvara | ehyehi mahā siddhayogī śvara. | ehy-ehi bho mahāsiddha-yogeśvara |
| | | | | saṇa saṇa vāce sadhaya sadhaya viddhyaṃ | haṇa×2 vāco sādhaya×2 vidyāṃ | bhaṇa-bhaṇa vācaṃ sādhaya-sādhaya vidyāṃ | |
| | | | | smīra smira śaṃ bhagavaṃtaṃ lokitavilokitaṃ lokeśvaraṃ tathāgataṃ | smara×2 bhagavantaṃ. lokita vilokita. tathāgataṃ. | smara-smara taṃ bhagava ntaṃ lokita-vilokitaṃ Lokeśvaram tathāgataṃ | |
| dharṣiṇina paṣa (= paya) mana svāhā | | darśanena prahlādaya manaḥ svāhā | kāmasya darśanena prahlādaya manaḥ svāhā | dadāhe me darśana kamasya darśanaṃ prakradaya ma na svāhā | dadā hime darśanaṃ. kāmasya darśanaṃ. prahlādaya menaṃ svāhā. | dadāhi me darśana-kāmasya darśanam prahlādaya manaḥ svāhā |
| siddhāya svāhā | | siddhāya svāhā | siddhāya svāhā | siddhāya svāhā | siddhāya svāhā. | siddhāya svāhā |
| mahāsiddhāya svāhā | | mahāsiddhāya svāhā | mahāsiddhāya svāhā | mahāsiddhāya svāhā | mahā siddhāya svāhā. | mahāsiddhāya svāhā |
| siddha-yogeśvakarāya svāhā | | siddha-yogeśvarāya svāhā | siddha-yogeśvarāya svāhā | siddhā-yogeśvaraya svāhā | siddhayogī śvarāya svāhā. | siddha-yogeśvarāya svāhā |
| narakindi svāhā | | Nīlakaṇṭhāya svāhā | Nīlakaṇṭhāya svāhā | Nirakaṃṭaya svāhā | nilakaṇthaya svāhā. | Nīlakaṇṭhāya svāhā |
| maranara svāhā | | Vāraha-mukhāya svāhā | Vāraha-mukha-siṃha-mukhāya svāhā | varāha-mukhāya svāhā | varāha mukhāya svāhā. | Varāha-mukhāya svāhā |
| sirasaṃha-mukhāya svāhā | | Narasiṃha-mukhāya svāhā | Vāraha-mukha-siṃha-mukhāya svāhā | mahādarasyiṃha-mukhaya svāhā | mahā siṃgha mukhāya svāhā. | MahāNarasiṃha-mukhāya svāhā |
| | | | | siddha-viddhyadharaya svāhā | siddha vidyā dharāya svāhā. | siddha-vidyādharāya svāhā |
| pamahā-siddhāya svāhā | | padma-hastāya svāhā | padma-hastāya svāhā | padma-hastaya svāhā | padma hastāya svāhā. | padma-hastāya svāhā |
| | | | | kṛṣṇi-sarpa-kṛdhya-yajyopavitaya svāhā | mahā kṛṣṇa sarpaya jṇopavitāya svāhā. | kṛṣṇa-sarpa-kṛta- yajñopavitāya svāhā | |
| | | | | mahā-lakuṭa-dharāya svāhā | mahā lakuṭa dharāya svāhā. | mahā-Lakuṭadharāya svāhā |
| cakra-siddhāya svāhā | | cakra-hastāya svāhā | cakrāyudhāya svāhā | cakrayudhaya svāhā | cakrā yudhāya svāhā. | cakr-āyudhāya svāhā |
| padma-kastāya svāhā | | padma-hastāya? svāhā | śaṇkha-śabda-nibodhanaya svāhā | śaṇkha-śabda-niboddhanāya svāhā | śaṃkha śabdani bodhanāya svāhā. | śaṇkha-śabda-nibodhanāya svāhā |
| Narakindi-vagaraya svāhā | | Nīlakaṇṭha-vyāghrāya svāhā | mahā-lakuṭa-dharāya svāhā | | | |
| mavari-śankaya svāhā | | Mahābali-Śankarāya svāhā | vāma-skanda-deśa-sthita-kṛṣṇājināya svāhā | mama-skanda-viṣa-sthita-kṛṣṇijināya svāhā | vāma skanda veṣa sthita kṛṣṇa jināya svāhā. | vāma-skandha-deśa-sthita-kṛṣṇ-ājināya svāhā |
| | | | vyāghra-carma-nivasanāya svāhā | vyāghra-cama-nivasanāya svāhā | vyāghra carmani vāsanāya svāhā. | vyāghra-carma-nivasanāya svāhā |
| | | | | lokeśvarāya svāhā | lokite śvarāya svāhā. | Lokeśvarāya svāhā |
| | | | | sarva-siddheśvaraya svāhā | sarva siddhe śvarāya svāhā. | sarva-siddheśvaraya svāhā |
| namo ratna-trayāya | | namo ratna-trayāya | namo ratna-trayāya | | | |
| nama āryāvalokiteśvarāya bodhi svāhā | | nama āryĀvalokiteśvarāya svāhā | namaḥ āryāvalokiteśvarāya svāhā | namo bhagavate āryāvalokiteśvarāya bodhisatvāya mahāsatvāya mahākāruṇikāya | namo bhagavate āryāvalokite śvarāya. bodhi satvāya mahā satvāya. mahā kāruṇikāya. | namo bhagavate āryĀvalokiteśvarāya bodhisattvāya mahāsattvāya mahākāruṇikāya |
| | | | | siddhyantu me vantra padāya svāhā | sidyaṃtu maṃntra padaya svāhā. | siddhyantu me mantra-padāni svāhā |
| | | | | | nilakaṇṭha nāma thāraṇi samāpta :ǀǀ⭘ǀǀ: namo. nilā. kaṇḍā. śaṃkhā. cakra tvāni. diṣī vasanāya. kriṣno sadya divāyajṇo. vetyā. kaccharmoya. nama skaṃṇta triuya. nārāyana rupa ིthāraṇaṃ ǀǀ trenitya muṃṇḍa ṭaṭe ǀǀ praviśa×2 vimālokite śvara. kurma hūm̐. ǀǀ hṛdaya maṃtra. um̐ truṃ samanta svāhā. nemo bhāgavatya āryā prajñā sāra | |

== See also ==
- Avalokiteśvara
- Guanyin
- Buddhism and Hinduism
- Dhāraṇī
- Harihara
- Mahayana sutras
- Śūraṅgama Mantra
- Ten Small Mantras
- Oṃ maṇi padme hūm̐
- Uṣṇīṣa Vijaya Dhāraṇī Sūtra
- Dharani pillar
