= Sutra of the Wise and the Fool =

The Sutra of the Wise and the Fool is a collection of tales translated from Central Asian languages into Chinese in the 4th century and then translated by Chos-Grub (法成) into Tibetan in the 9th century. The simple plot lines of these tales has made them popular readings in first year Tibetan courses.
