= Chos grub =

9th-century Tibetan translator

Chos grub (Tibetan: འགོས་ཆོས་གྲུབ།, Wylie: 'gos chos grub; Chinese: 法成; pinyin: Fǎchéng) was a Tibetan translator who flourished in the early 9th Century and produced translations under the auspices of the Tibetan Empire. Details of his life are sketchy, but he appears to have been based at Xiuduo Monastery 修多寺, in Dunhuang, during the Tibetan occupation of Gansu (which lasted from c. 755–848). He is best known as the translator of Woncheuk's Saṃdhinirmocanasūtra Commentary which was subsequently known in Tibet as The Great Chinese Commentary (rgya cher 'grel pa).

Among other works he translated the Mdzangs blun (Sutra of the Wise and the Fool) from Chinese into Tibetan, and a translation of the Heart Sutra from Tibetan into Chinese (T 255) .
