= Yujia Yankou =

Chinese Buddhist ritual

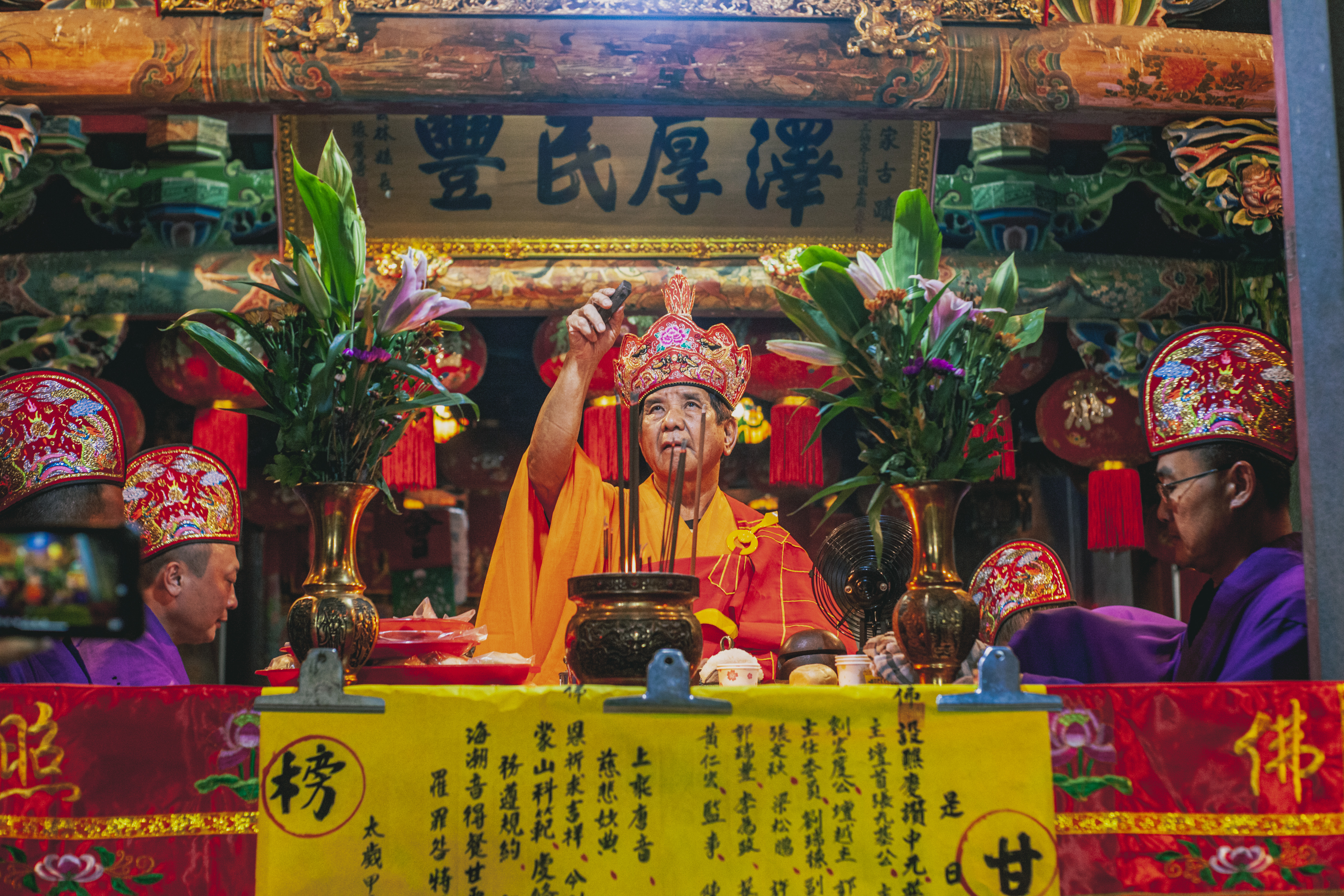
During a Yuqie Yankou, one or more leading monk(s) take on the role of a jingang shangshi, meaning vajrācārya (金剛上師, Jīngāng Shàngshī).

The Yuqie Yankou rite (Chinese: 瑜伽燄口, pinyin: Yúqié Yànkǒu, lit: "Yoga Flaming-Mouth Food Bestowal"), sometimes called the Yujia Yankou rite, is an esoteric Chinese Buddhist ritual typically performed to fulfill several different goals, including to nourish and liberate hungry ghosts, to promote longevity and prolong the lifespans of the living, as well as to avert calamities and prevent disasters. The ritual is commonly performed during or at the end of regular religious temple events such as repentance rites (懺悔, Chànhǔi), Buddha recitation retreats (佛七, Fóqī), the dedication of a new monastic complex or gatherings for the transmission of monastic vows. It is also widely performed as a post-mortem rite within Chinese society during funerals and other related occasions such as the Ghost Festival. While the ritual originated as a rite to feed hungry ghosts, or egui (餓鬼, Èguǐ), certain traditional commentaries have expanded its scope and significance to include the nourishment and ultimate liberation of all sentient beings, including devas, asuras and humans. Due to the eclectic and non-exclusivist nature of Chinese Buddhism, where monks and nuns are usually trained in multiple Buddhist traditions and there is historically little to no sectarianism between the different traditions, the Yuqie Yankou is practiced by monastics who are trained across all different traditions in Chinese Buddhism, such as Chan, Esoteric, Pure Land, Tiantai and Huayan Buddhism.

The ritual combines features of Chinese operatic tradition (including a wide range of instrumental music as well as vocal performances such as solo deliveries, antiphonal and choral singing), the recitation of sūtras similar to other Mahāyāna rituals as well as esoteric Vajrayāna practices (including maṇḍala offerings, recitation of esoteric mantras, execution of mudrās and visualization practices involving identifying oneself with a divinity). In particular, the usage of mantras, mudrās and maṇḍalas in the ritual correspond directly to the concept of the "Three Mysteries" (三密, Sānmì) in tantric Buddhism: the "secrets" of body, speech and mind. The ritual is one out of several esoteric Chinese Buddhists rites dedicated to the salvation of sentient beings, such as the Mengshan Shishi (蒙山施食, Méngshān Shīshí, lit: "Mengshan food bestowal") that is carried out in daily liturgical services. It is also usually performed as part of the more extensive Shuilu Fahui ceremony (水陸法會, Shuǐlù Fǎhuì, lit: "Water and Land Dharma Assembly"), where its function is to aid in the salvation of all sentient beings.

A similar ritual known as the Lingbao Pudu rite (靈寶普度, Língbǎo Pǔdù, lit: "Universal Salvation rites of Lingbao") exists in Taoist traditions. It resembles the ritual program of the Yuqie Yankou rite (involving a descent to hell and a salvific nourishing of the beings of the universe), but possesses numerous striking differences such as the invocation of deities and figures from the Taoist pantheon in place of Buddhist figures, the utilization of specialized Taoist mantras and fulu (or written talismans) as well as the employment of a liturgy based on Taoist conceptualizations and understanding.

== Etymology ==
The word yuqie (瑜伽) refers to the Sanskrit word yoga (योग). The term is used in the Chinese Buddhist canon to refer to two different and unrelated corpuses of texts – the non-esoteric, exegetical texts of the Yogācāra tradition and a wide range of texts of the esoteric type. The esoteric texts with “yuqie” in their titles can be further divided into two distinctive groups: Texts from the Vajraśekhara ( 金剛頂, Jīngāngdǐng) cycle of teachings and practices, and texts not directly related to the Vajraśekhara. Traditional commentaries on the term "yuqie" glosses over it as the practice of the “mutual correspondence of the three actions", with the three actions referring to mental, verbal and physical actions.

== History ==
=== Tang dynasty to Yuan dynasty (7th - 14th century) ===
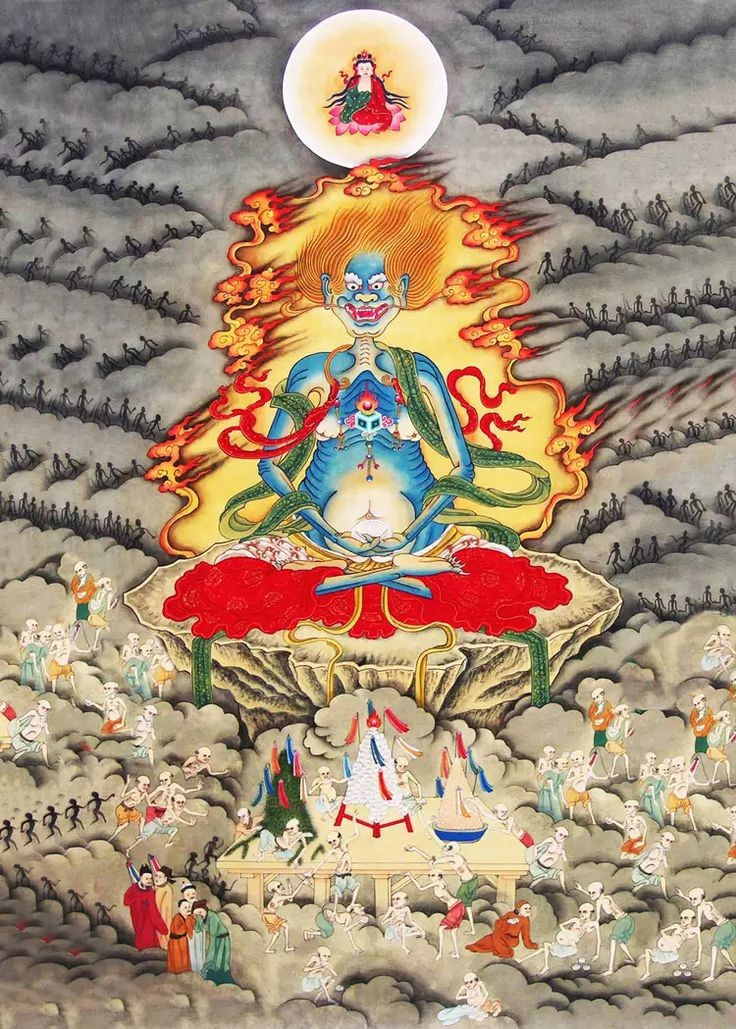
A Shuilu ritual painting of the ghost king Mianran (Sanskrit: Ulkāmukha Pretarāja), which is usually displayed alongside paintings of other Buddhist divinities during Shuilu Fahui ceremonies. The portrayal of the Bodhisattva Guanyin above Mianran indicates that he is a manifestation of the Bodhisattva.

==== The Burning-Face Sūtra and The Flaming-Mouth Sūtra ====
The basic structure of the ritual was based on well-established templates stemming from the Sarvatathagatatattvasamgraha and its related cycle of texts. Two sources translated during the Tang dynasty (618 - 907) were particularly influential in establishing its framework: The Burning-Face Sūtra^{[zh]} (佛說救面燃餓鬼陀羅尼神咒經, Fóshuō Jiù Miànrán Èguǐ Tuóluóní Shénzhòu Jīng, lit "Sūtra Spoken by the Buddha on the Dhāraṇī-spell that Saved the Burning-Face Hungry Ghost") which was translated by Śikṣānanda^{[zh]} between the years 700 - 704, and the Flaming-Mouth Sūtra^{[zh]} (佛說救拔燄口餓鬼陀羅尼經, Fóshuō Jiùbá Yànkǒu Èguǐ Tuóluóní Jīng, lit "Sūtra Spoken by the Buddha on the Dhāraṇī that Rescued the Flaming-Mouth Hungry Ghost") which was translated by Amoghavajra between the years 757 - 770. The two texts are translations of two different recensions of a yet unstable Indian Buddhist sūtra that was already in existence no later than the seventh century which were widely circulating in China at the time. Of the two different translations, later ghost-feeding liturgies such as the Mengshan Shishi mostly relied on Amoghavajra's Flaming-Mouth Sūtra, which overshadowed Śikṣānanda's earlier translation due to its longer length as well as Amoghavajra's prestige as a Buddhist adept. Both texts center on the narrative of Ānanda's encounter with a ghost king named either Mianran (面燃, Miànrán, lit: "Burning Face") or Yankou (燄口, Yànkǒu, lit: "Flaming Mouth") that warned him about his impending death and rebirth in the realm of hungry ghosts which would happen unless he was able to give one measure of food and drink the size of a bushel used in Magadha to each of the one hundred thousand nayutas of hungry ghosts and other beings. The encounter prompted Ānanda to beg Śākyamuni Buddha for a way to avert his fate, at which point the Buddha revealed a ritual and a dhāraṇī that he had been taught in a past life when he was a Brahmin by the Bodhisattva Avalokiteśvara, who is known in East Asia as Guanyin (觀音菩薩, Guānyīn Púsà). Part of the ritual involved the brief invocation of the names of four Buddhas. According to the sūtra, the performance of the ritual would not only feed the hungry ghosts but would also ensure the longevity of the performing ritualist. The sūtra ends with Ānanda performing the rite according to the Buddha's instructions and avoiding the threat of rebirth into the realm of the hungry ghosts. Buddhist traditions hold that he eventually achieved longevity and attained the state of arhathood.

==== The Method of Bestowing Drink and Food ====
While the Burning-Face Sūtra and the Flaming-Mouth Sūtra contained the basic structure and framework of a simple rite, they lack more complex elements necessary for them to function as liturgical texts (儀軌, Yíguǐ, Sanskrit: vidhi). The earliest known work which attempts to turn the ritual elements contained in the two translated sūtras into a practice anchored on a written liturgy is the Method of Bestowing Drink and Food (施諸餓鬼飲食及水法, Shī Zhū Èguǐ Yǐnshíjíshuǐ Fǎ, lit "Method of Bestowing Drink and Food and Water to All Hungry Ghosts") which is conventionally dated to the late 8th century to 9th century period, although some scholars have pointed out strong evidence linking it to an earlier date. This text is traditionally claimed as instructions from Amoghavajra himself, and a Dunhuang manuscript of the text refers to itself as the “oral instructions of the ‘Translator of Great and Broad wisdom’” (i.e. Amoghavajra). The text incorporates the ritual and dhāraṇī taught in the two sūtras, while adding an array of other hymns, spells, recitations and mudrās, the name of an additional Buddha (inserted in the original group of four) and specific instructions on visualizations and other related ritual-acts. The ritual structure and content of the Method of Bestowing Drink and Food later became the basic template for later ghost-feeding rites in Japan, with various further indigenous alterations and adjustments. In China, this text also became the prototype for further development and more esoteric elements were added to it, which eventually lead to the creation of the Yuqie Yankou rite.

==== Flaming-Mouth Liturgy Sūtra ====
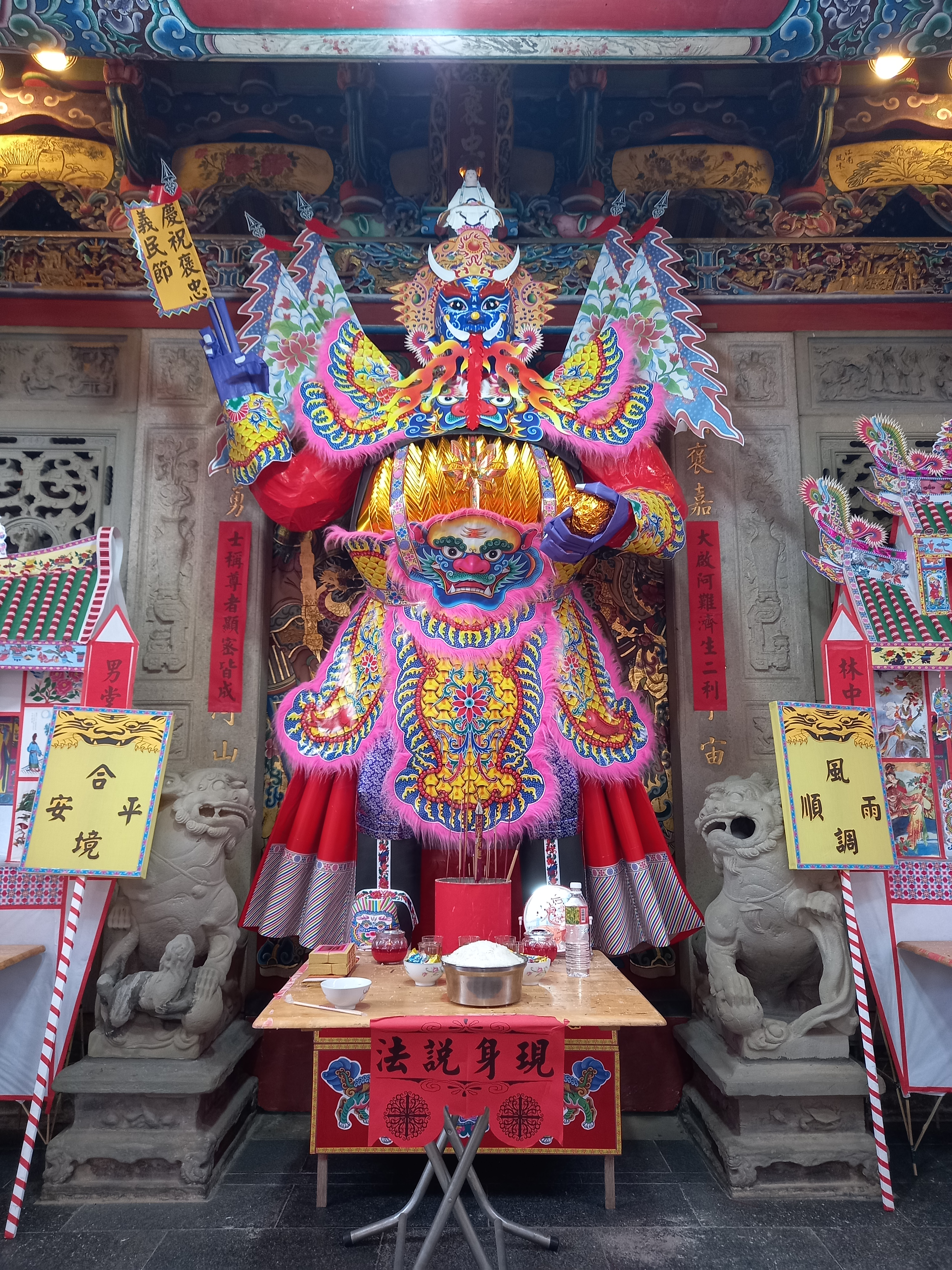
Taoist effigy of Jiaomian Dashi at a ghost festival in Taiwan. The veneration of this deity is popular in both Chinese Buddhism as well as Taoism, where he is also known as Dashiye (大士爺, Dàshìyé, lit: "Master Mahāsattva") or Puduye (普渡爺, Pǔdùyé, lit: "Master of Universal Salvation").

Another text that was influential in the development of the Yuqie Yankou rite is the Flaming-Mouth Liturgy Sūtra (瑜伽集要救阿難陀羅尼焰口儀軌經, Yújiā Jíyào Jiù Ānán Tuóluóní Yànkǒu Yíguǐ Jīng, lit "Sūtra of the Flaming-Mouth Liturgy, the Collected Essentials of the Yoga of the Dhāraṇī that Saved Ānanda"), which is also traditionally attributed to Amoghavajra, and its contents is mostly based on the Flaming-Mouth Sūtra. The earliest extant version of this text can be found among the Fangshan Stone-carved Sūtras, dating to the Jin dynasty (1115 - 1234). Like The Method of Bestowing Drink and Food, this text contains a liturgical section with more developed and complex ritual elements which made it utilizable as a ritual manual. The text frames the practice of ghost-feeding within standard Mahāyāna rhetoric of universal liberation of all sentient beings, and also insists that the performers of ghost-feeding rites have to be properly initiated into esoteric practice by a qualified ācārya and the instructions for the construction of a special altar or platform known as the “Samaya-platform” (三昧耶壇, Sānmèiyé Tán) for the performance of the ghost-feeding rite. Notably, this text makes reference to the ghost that Ānanda encounters using the term "Dashi" (大士, Dàshì), meaning "mahāsattva" or "Great Being", a term that is usually used to refer to bodhisattvas. This reference is instrumental in the identification of the ghost in Chinese traditions as a manifestation of the bodhisattva Guanyin, and he is referred to in Chinese Buddhist practices (including the Yuqie Yankou) as Mianran Dashi (面燃大士, Miànrán Dàshì, lit "Burning-Face Mahāsattva") and in Taoist practices as Jiaomian Dashi (焦面大士, Jiāomiàn Dàshì, lit "Burning-Face Mahāsattva"). The text also explicitly situates itself in the mainstream Chinese Esoteric Buddhist tradition (密宗, Mìzōng) through the encouragement that performers of the ritual should be taught and initiated into the teachings of the ritual by a qualified master through the conferment of an esoteric empowerment or abhiṣeka (灌頂, Guàndǐng).

==== Song Tiantai Ghost-Feeding Texts ====
In the Song dynasty (960 - 1279), while the Method of Bestowing Drink and Food and the Flaming-Mouth Liturgy Sūtra were still in circulation, new ghost-feeding texts were also composed and compiled by monastics of the Tiantai tradition based on both the Burning-Face Sūtra and The Flaming-Mouth Sūtra. Two extant collections of Song Tiantai ghost-feeding are the Golden Garden Record (金園集, Jīnyuánjí) by the monk Ciyun Zunshi^{[zh]} (慈雲遵式, Cíyún Zūnshì) and the Survey of Food-Bestowal Rites (施食通覽, Shīshí Tōnglǎn) by the monk Zongxiao (宗晓, Zōngxiǎo). Each text contains several different fascicles regarding the rites and liturgies of ghost-feeding rituals. Notably, one of the fascicles in the Golden Garden Record, the Food-Bestowal Liturgy (施食文, Shīshíwén), not only refers to the ghost that Ānanda encountered as a "Dashi" (like in the Flaming-Mouth Liturgy Sūtra), but also further specifies his identity as a ghost king (鬼王, Guǐwáng). The text also gives greater importance to his role as a central figure in the performance of the rites. However, key one characteristic that these ritual liturgies lack is the execution of mudrās and visualization sequences that are present in the Method of Bestowing Drink and Food and the Flaming-Mouth Liturgy Sūtra, as well as the finalized liturgical text of the Yuqie Yankou rite.

==== Flaming-Mouth Food-Bestowal Rite ====
The Flaming-Mouth Liturgy Sūtra was heavily influential as a template for the composition of another liturgical prototype known as the Flaming-Mouth Food-Bestowal Rite (瑜伽集要焰口施食儀, Yújiā Jíyào Yànkou Shīshí Yí, lit "The Collected Essentials of the Yoga of Flaming-Mouth Food-Bestowal Rite") during either the Yuan dynasty (1271 -1368) or the early Ming dynasty (1368 - 1644). This text contains all the spells and most of the prose and verses that were included in the Flaming-Mouth Liturgy Sūtra, with the addition of more complex ritual elements and textual elaborations. The most notable element incorporated into the Flaming-Mouth Food-Bestowal Rite is the self-identification of the celebrant, referred to as the guru (上師, Shàngshī) of the rite, with Guanyin through a meditation-ritual. This type of self-identification with a Buddha or bodhisattva is a form of deity yoga and is often regarded as one of the hallmarks of “esoteric” Buddhist practices. In this way, the performer of the rite visualizes himself or herself as Guanyin using her powers to feed and liberate hungry ghosts. Other incorporated elements include an extensive list of mantras and mudrās.

=== Ming dynasty to Present (14th - 21st century) ===
==== Huashan Yankou liturgy ====
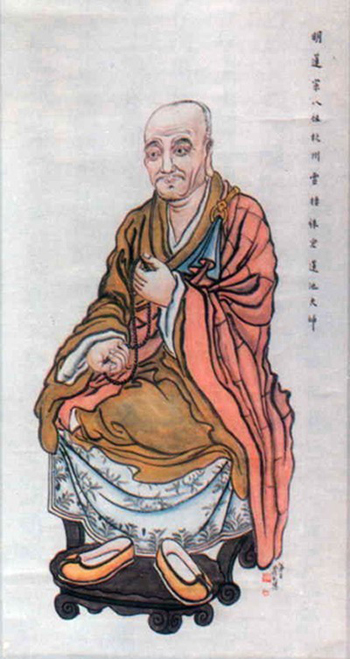
Portrait of Zhuhong.

By the late Ming dynasty (1368 - 1644), Yuqie Yankou rites were so popular that numerous different versions of the liturgy, each based on the earlier prototypes, began to circulate. In response, the Eighth Patriarch of the Pure Land tradition Yunqi Zhuhong (雲棲袾宏, Yúnqī Zhūhóng) re-codified an edition of the liturgical text for the Yuqie Yankou which was meant to standardize the rite. In Zhuhong's liturgy, he presents his edition as remaining close to the original intent of the rite. He attempted to shorten the text, but at the same time he also added more esoteric material such as purificatory and empowering spells. One of the most notable material found in Zhuhong's re-codified liturgy is the ritual presentation and offering of a maṇḍala. In this sub-section, an ideal universe based on the Buddhist cosmology found in Abhidharma texts, such as the Abhidharmakośa, is “created” by the celebrant by the power of his visualizations, the spells recited and the corresponding ritual-acts and presented as an offering to the guru of the rite, the Three Jewels and all other enlightened beings. The re-codified text still maintained most of the text and rites from the Flaming-Mouth Food-Bestowal Rite. Zhuhong's biographies indicated that he performed the Yuqie Yankou rites numerous times himself, likely using his own liturgy, for reasons that ranged from offering repose to souls, to abating plagues and droughts and to pacifying disturbances caused by tigers attacking humans.

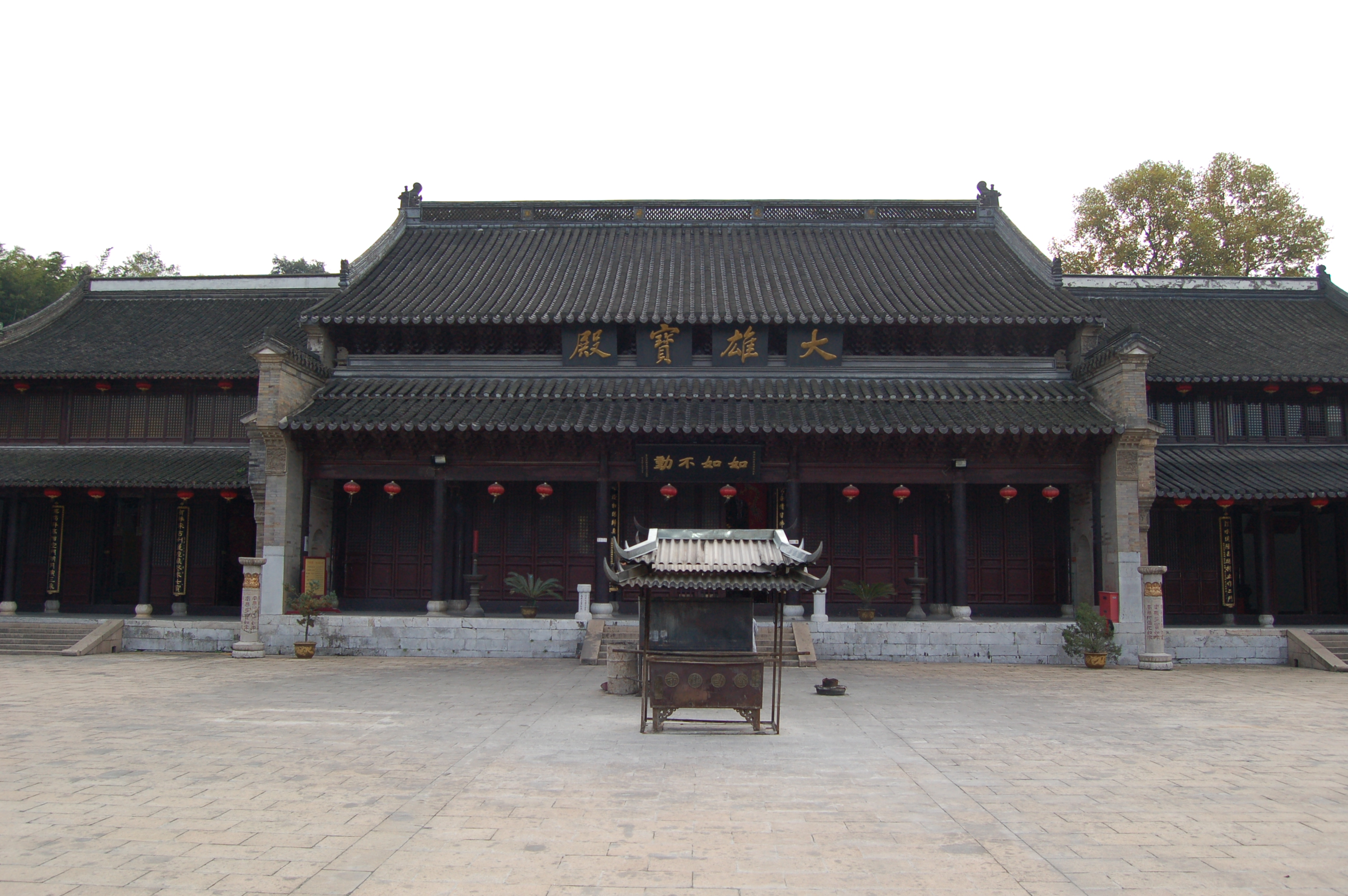
The Mahavira Hall of Longchang Temple in Jiangsu, China where the standardized form of the Yuqie Yankou liturgy was popularized.

In the Qing dynasty (1644 - 1912), Zhuhong was admired by the early Qing emperors for his endeavor to emphasize and encourage strict monastic disciple, and his legacy was promoted by the imperial family. Around the same period, the Longchang Temple (隆昌寺, Lóngchāng Sì) located on Mount Baohua in Jiangsu province was gaining a reputation as a pre-eminent monastic center after the construction of a new ordination platform under the patronage of the emperors. In 1693, the third abbot of the temple, Deji Ding'an (德基定庵, Déjī Dìng'ān) eventually received Zhuhong's re-codified version of the Yuqie Yankou rite. Under his supervision, Zhuhong's version was reworked and more material was incorporated into it. Ding'an's reworked version was subsequently known as the "Huashan Yankou” (華山燄口, Huàshān Yànkǒu) liturgy. The prestige of Longchang Temple at the time meant that monastics from various parts of China were travelling in great numbers to be ordinated at the temple. While post-ordination training was not compulsory, records show that most monks who received their ordination chose to stay in the temple afterwards and received training, which mostly focused on the study of liturgy and ritual. This included the pronunciation of the hanzi (Chinese characters) used to transliterate Sanskrit names and spells, the learning of the complex mudrās used for performances of the Yuqie Yankou rite, ritual details related to a whole repertoire of post-mortem rites and finally, ordination ritual and procedure. Most monks returned to their home temples while others took up residence and administrative responsibilities in other monasteries in the different parts of China. In this way, Ding'an's finalized version of the Yuqie Yankou rites, taught to the monks who were receiving training at Longchang Temple, came to become the dominant liturgy of the rite throughout China, resulting in a more or less standardized form of the liturgy. In addition to the main liturgical text, the current ritual manual also includes important notes and commentary on the liturgy that were later added by Shengxing Zongzeng (聖性宗增, Shèngxìng Zōngzēng), the fifteenth abbot of Baohua Monastery who lived during the mid-nineteenth century.

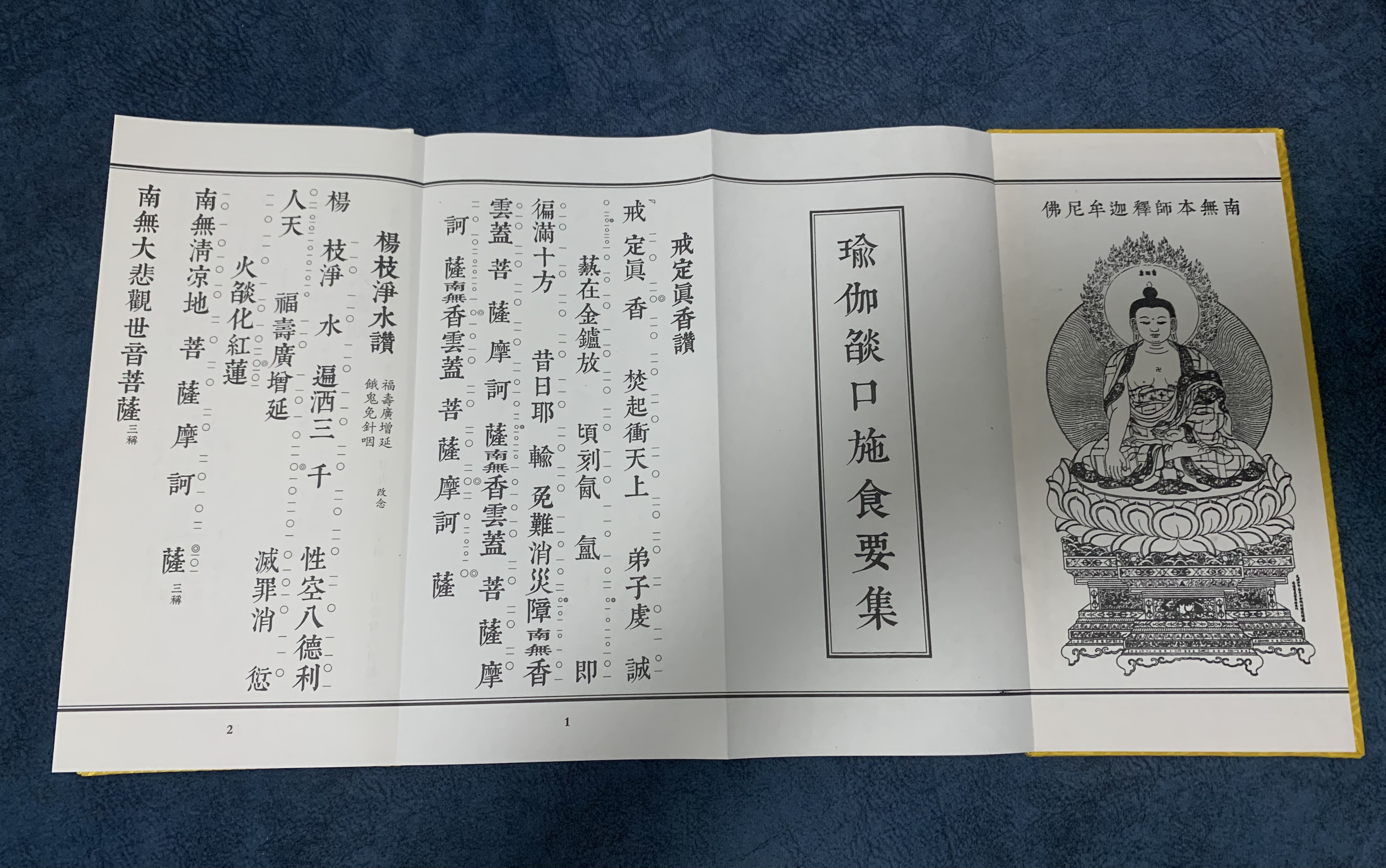
A contemporary print of the ritual manual for the Yuqie Yankou rite, bound in the jingzhe zhuang style.

The Huashan Yankou version of the liturgy, known as the Yuqie Yankou Shishi Yaoji (瑜伽燄口施食要集, Yújiā yànkǒu shīshí yào jí, lit: "Essentials of the Yoga Flaming-Mouth Food Bestowal"), remains the most widely utilized version in contemporary Chinese Buddhist practice throughout China, Taiwan, Singapore, Malaysia and other overseas Chinese communities. Furthermore, the Huashan Yankou in turn has its own variations between different Chinese communities. Although its variations are not liturgical, variations do exist regarding the performative aspect of the ritual. For example, in the case of Taiwan, at least two sub-traditions of the Huashan Yankou exist – the Gushan tradition (鼓山派, Gǔshān pài, lit: "Mount Gu^{[zh]”}) and the Haichaoyin tradition (海潮音派, Hǎicháoyīn pài, lit: "Sound of ocean waves").

==== Cantonese Yankou liturgy ====
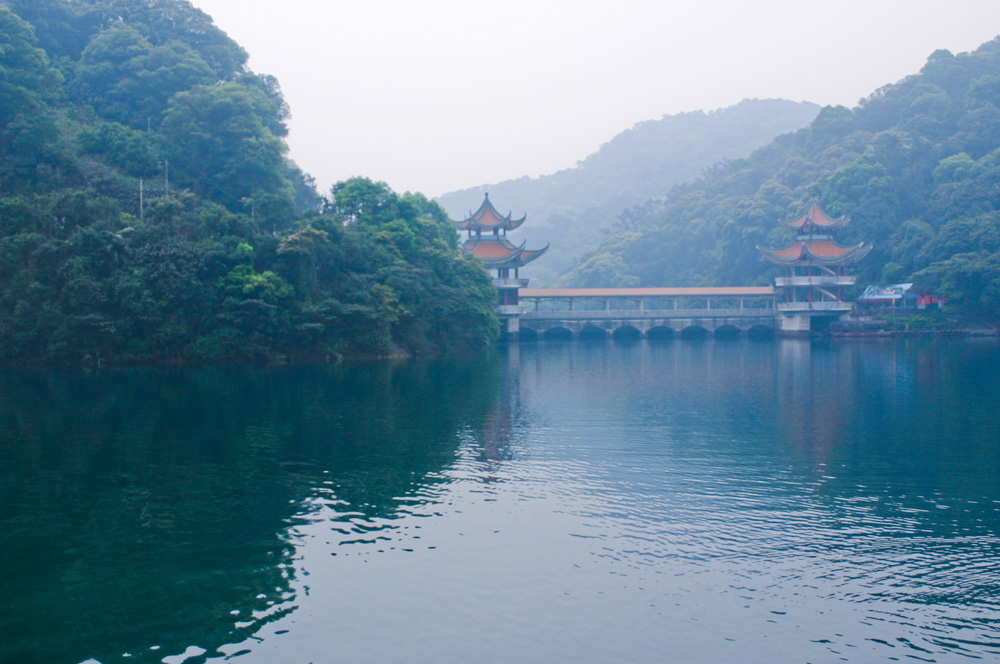
Dinghu Mountain (鼎湖山, Dǐnghú shān) in Guandong, China where Qingyun Temple is located.

Another version of the liturgy that is also practiced in certain contemporary Chinese Buddhist temples to a lesser extent is the "Cantonese Yankou” (廣東燄口, Guǎngdōng Yànkǒu) liturgy. This version originates from Qingyun Temple (慶雲寺, Qìngyún Sì) located in the province of Guandong. The temple was founded by the monk Liji Daoqiu (蘺際道丘, Líjì Dàoqiū), who also served as its first abbot. Daoqiu was a close associate of Zhuhong, with whom he studied for a significant period of time, possibly until the latter's death in 1615. One of Daoqiu's biographies claims that Daoqiu “inherited Zhuhong’s robes and bowl", an expression that normally refers to being a successor of a previous master. Daoqiu was heavily influenced by Zhuhong's teachings, especially his focus on Pure Land practices that are based on Huayan and Chan understandings of the mind as well as his emphasis on strict monastic discipline. Extent documents by Daoqiu explicitly states that he ran Qingyun Temple, “according to the way and style of Yunqi Monastery" (i.e. Zhuhong's monastery) and that Zhuhong's portrait occupied a central position in the temple's lineage hall. In addition to the other teachings of Zhuhong, Dinghu also brought Zhuhong's re-codified Yuqie Yankou liturgy to Qingyun Temple where it continued to be passed down to succeeding monastics of the temple and was subsequently known as the "Cantonese Yankou". Aside of the addition of a few passages at the beginning of the rite, the Cantonese Yankou liturgy is identical with Zhuhong's re-codified version. At one point, usage of this liturgy spread from Qingyun Temple into surrounding monasteries in the Guandong area, until its popularity became eclipsed by Ding'an's reworked version. In contemporary Chinese Buddhism, only Qingyun Temple and its branch monasteries in other areas such as Hong Kong still practice the Yuqie Yankou rites using the Cantonese Yankou liturgy, with the vast majority of Chinese temples using the Huashan Yankou liturgy instead.

== Ritual ==
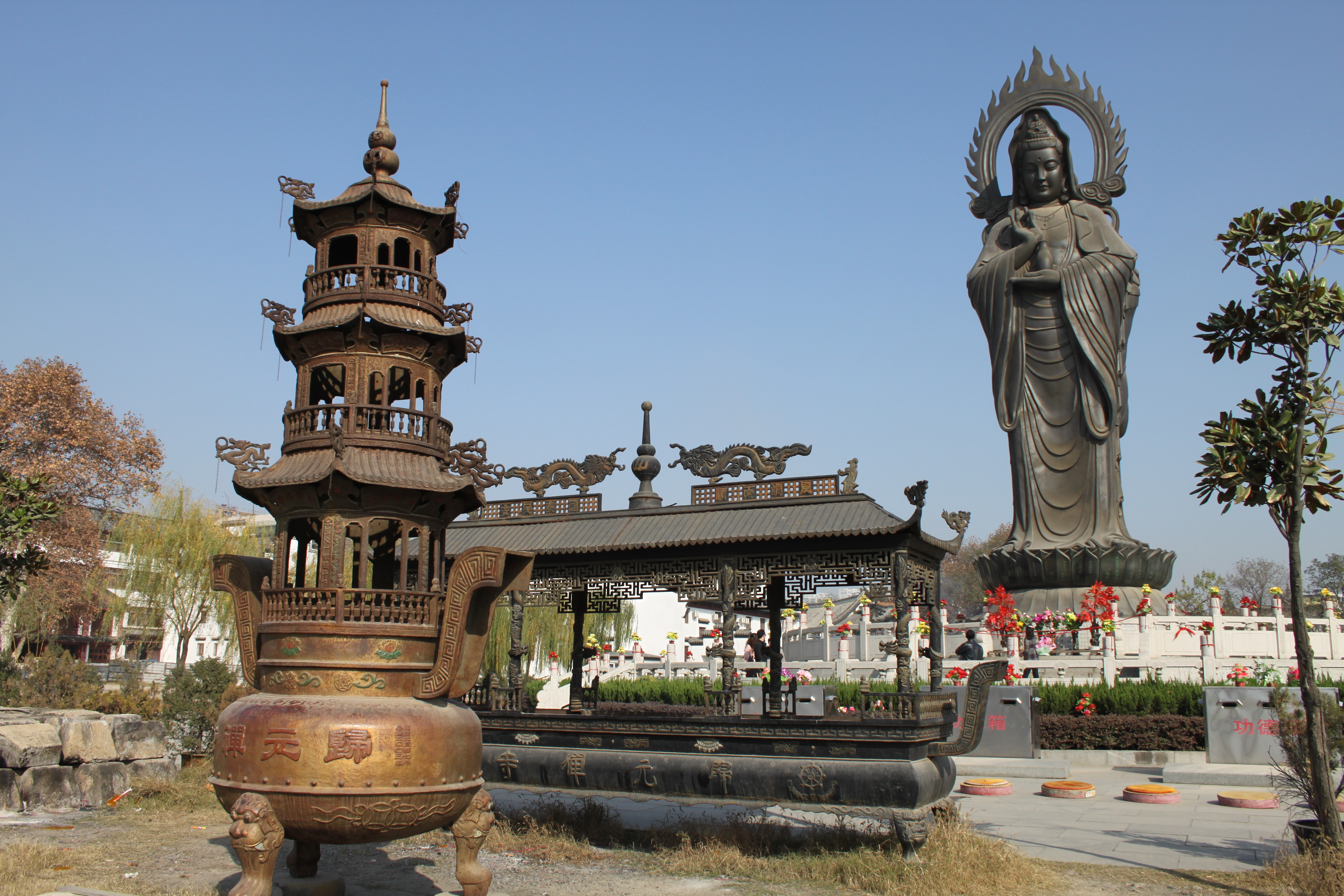
In the ritual, the leading monastic(s), or jingang shangshi, performs deity yoga with the Bodhisattva Guanyin as the yidam.

=== Ritual Outline ===
The Buddhist version of the rite involves assembling beings from all of the six realms of saṃsāra, which involves an assault on hell followed by a banquet for the egui. There are two types of Yuqie Yankou rites: the "yin yankou" (陰燄口, Yīn yànkǒu) which is usually held for the benefit of the recently deceased and ancestors, and the "yang yankou" (陽燄口, Yáng yànkǒu) which is usually held for the longevity and general blessings of the living as well as for warding off disasters. The process of carrying out the ritual is termed "fang yankou" (放燄口, Fàng yànkǒu), which literally translates to "liberating the flaming-mouths".

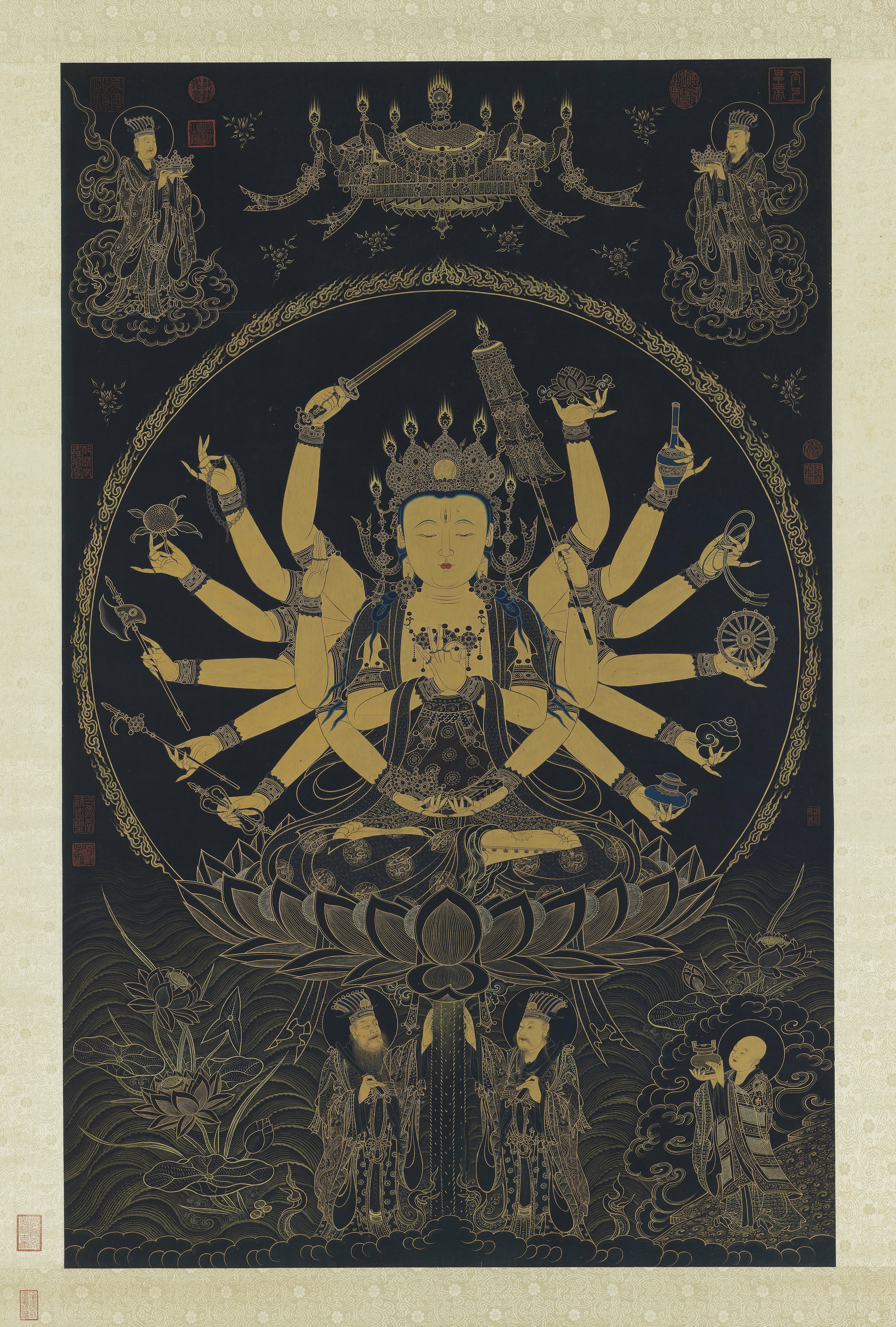
Various Buddhist figures are invoked with their mantras during the ritual, including the Bodhisattva Cundī, who is depicted here in a Ming dynasty (1368 - 1644) painting.

The entire ritual can be structurally divided into two main sections: the “upper section” (上篇, Shàngpiān) and the “lower section” (下篇, Xìapiān). The upper section unfolds with the purification and consecration of the altars and the ritual space, followed by the invocation of enlightened beings, including the Five Tathāgatas, Guanyin, Cundī and the Wisdom King Mahācakra via means such as the chanting of mantras, execution of mudrās as well as visualization of seed-syllables associated with them. The officiating monastics also makes use of tantric ritual items during this process, such as vajras (金剛棒, Jīngāngbàng) and ghantas (金剛鈴, Jīngānglíng). The lower section mainly involves the use of mantras to assemble the egui, to open the hells and the eguis’ constricted throats, to eliminate their karmic obstructions, and to multiply the offerings of amrita to slake their thirst. As part of the ritual, the assembled beings are also inducted into Buddhism via the transmission of refuge, then the bodhisattva precepts, and eventually the esoteric samaya precepts (via an incorporated abhiṣeka rite) in order to qualified them to listen to the esoteric Buddhist teachings. There are three types officiating monastics who play the main role in every performance of the ritual. The first is the main celebrant(s), who will take on the role of a jingang shangshi, or vajrācārya (金剛上師, Jīngāng Shàngshī), during the ritual. The second type is called the weina (維那, Wéinà), who will play the role of the lead cantor. The third type is called the yuezhong (悅眾, Yuèzhòng), who will play the role of the assisting cantor. The weina and the yuezhong typically sit on the left and right of the main celebrant. The remaining monastics help in facilitating the ritual's proceedings, such as by singing the chorus and playing percussive instruments. The number of main celebrants during a rite can be either singular or plural. If there are more than one main celebrant during the same ritual, the number of main celebrants chosen is traditionally an odd number.

The upper section consists of the following subsections:

1. Ascending the seat (昇坐, Shēngzuò)
2. Entering samādhi (入定, Rùdìng)
3. Purification (灑淨, Sǎjìng)
4. Taking refuge (歸依, Guīyī)
5. Visualizing the daochang (道場觀, Dàochǎng Guān)
6. Presenting the maṇḍala (獻曼荼羅, Xiàn Màntúluó)
7. Universal offering (普供養, Pǔ Gòngyǎng)

The lower section consists of the following subsections:

1. Entering samādhi (入定, Rùdìng)
2. Inviting and summoning (召請, Zhàoqǐng)
3. Exoteric food bestowal (顯施食, Xiǎn Shīshí)
4. Eliminating impediments (滅障, Mièzhàng)
5. Esoteric food bestowal (密施食, Mì Shīshí)
6. Transference of merit (回向, Huíxiàng)

=== Opening ===
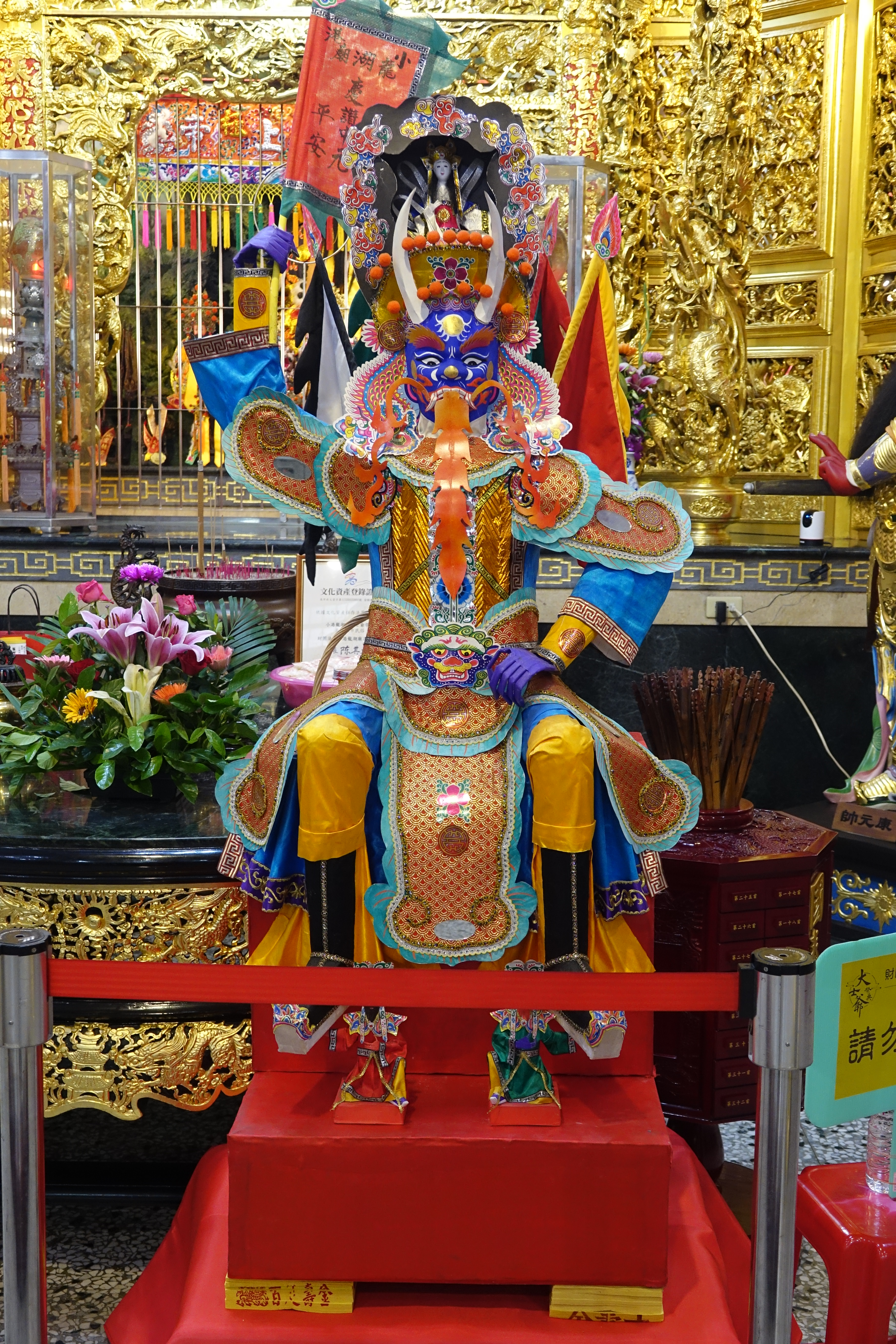
Effigy of Mianran Dashi at a temple in Taiwan. Similar effigies are sometimes enshrined at the Mianran Altar during the ritual.

In modern performances of the Yuqie Yankou rite, the opening of the ceremony is marked by the offering of incense and the singing of several eulogies (讚, Zàn) to the accompaniment of percussive instruments played by the assisting monastics at the main altar of the rite, known as the Yuqie Altar (瑜伽璮, Yújiā Tǎn), or alternatively, as the Yankou platform (燄口台, Yànkǒu Tái). The Yuqie Altar is where the officiating monastics will later sit and perform the majority of the ritual after the opening section, while the patrons face the monastics. In general, the seat(s) of the main celebrant(s) of the rite (who will later take on the mantle of the jingang shangshi) is positioned on the Altar such that it is facing the patrons and audience of the rite. The seats of the remaining monastics are typically positioned on both sides of the Altar, facing each other. A statue of Guanyin or Dizang (the Chinese name for the Bodhisattva Kṣitigarbha) may also sometimes be enshrined in front of the seat(s) of the main celebrant(s). Other items that will later be used during the ritual are also typically prepared and arranged on the Altar in front of the seat(s) of the main celebrant(s) before the rite begins, such as vajras, ghantas, a maṇḍala plate, offerings as well as instruments like a wooden fish.

After the opening eulogies, the participants, consisting of the main celebrant(s), the assisting monastics, the patron(s) and other participants then proceed to a second altar known as the Mianran Altar (面燃壇, Miànrán Tǎn), which enshrines the deity known as Mianran Dashi (面燃大士, Miànrán Dàshì, lit "Burning-Face Mahāsattva"), a ghost king who is regarded as a manifestation of Guanyin. At this altar, the participants chant homages to Mianran Dashi and recite various sūtras and dhāraṇīs, including the Heart Sūtra and the Amitābha Pure Land Rebirth Mantra. Verses regarding transfer of merit as well as cadences paying homage to the Buddha Amitābha, who is known in Chinese as Amituofo (阿彌陀佛, Āmítuó Fó), are also sung.

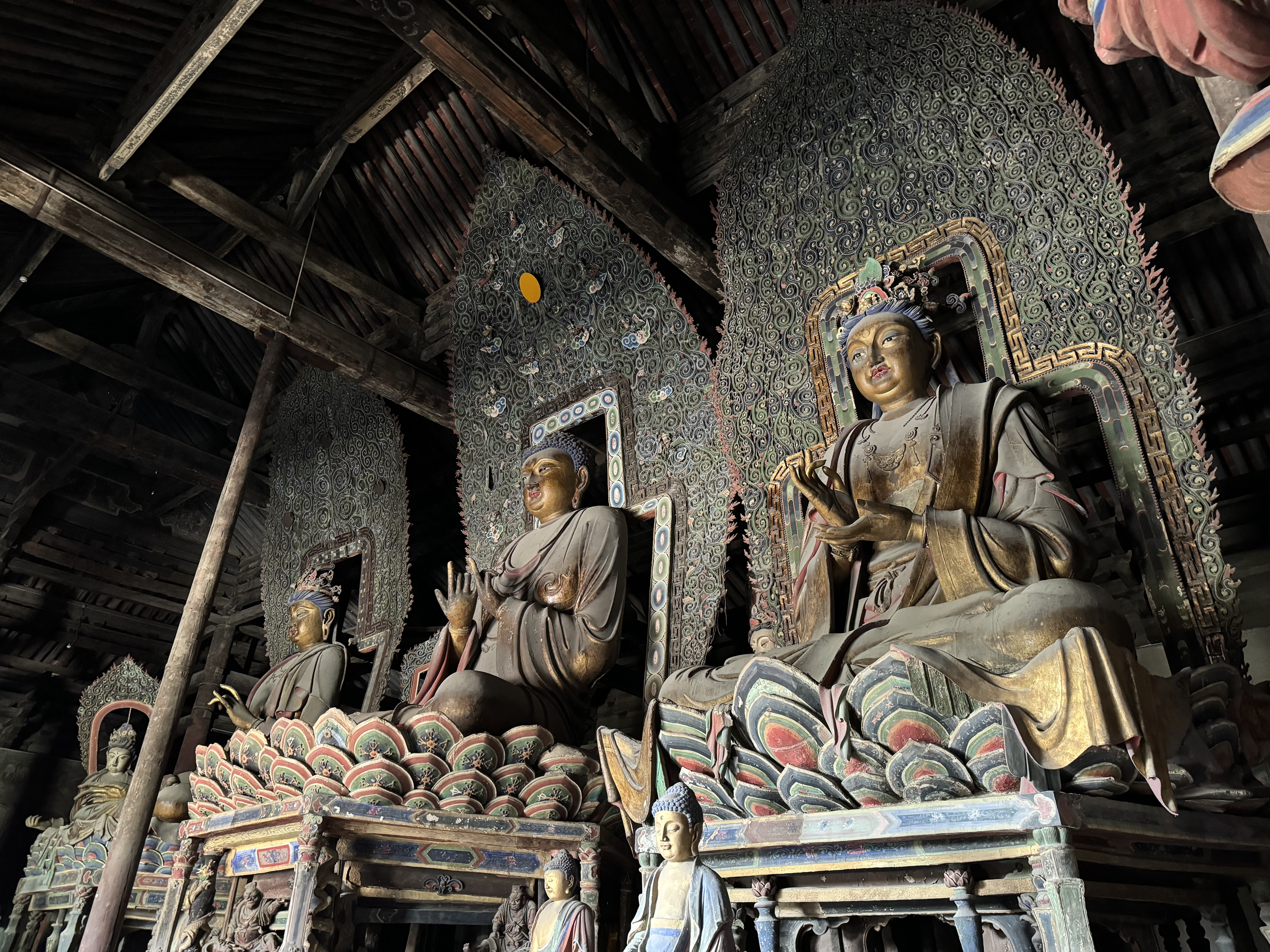
Ming dynasty (1368 - 1644) statues of the triad of Sukhāvatī, a popular grouping of divinities that consists of Amituofo, Guanyin and Dashizhi, in Chongfu Temple^{[zh]} (崇福寺, Chóngfú Sì) in Shanxi, China. This triad is usually enshrined at the Rebirth Altar during "yin yankou" performances.

After this, the participants then proceed to a third altar known alternatively as either the Rebirth Altar (往生壇, Wǎngshēng Tǎn) or the Pure Land Altar (淨土壇, Jìngtǔ Tǎn), which enshrines the triad of Sukhāvatī (西方三聖, Xīfāng Sānshèng), consisting of the Buddha Amituofo as well as the bodhisattvas Guanyin and Dashizhi (Mahāsthāmaprāpta). In performances of "yin yankou", placards bearing the name of names of the departed ones who are the direct recipient of the merit of the rite are written on yellow placards and placed on this altar. In performances of "yang yankou", there is no Rebirth Altar. Instead, there is a Lengthening-Life Altar where the names of living persons who should receive the merit of the rite are written on red placards and placed on the altar.

Following this, the participants then returns to the primary Yuqie Altar where several more eulogies are sung by the weina and prostrations are made towards the altar. At the end of the eulogies, the main celebrant(s) and several assistant monastics will ascend the Yuqie Altar while the rest of the assembly chants homages to the Buddha Rocana continuously until the celebrant has finished ascending the altar. After the celebrant has ascended to the raised-platform of the altar, the other monastics similarly move to their respective places at the altar, arranged to the left and right of the celebrant, facing outwards towards the Mianran Altar. The lay patron and other people will remain below the stage throughout the rite, forming the audience, and they may later be called upon to enter the performance of the ritual at different junctures.

=== Upper Section ===
==== Ascending The Seat ====
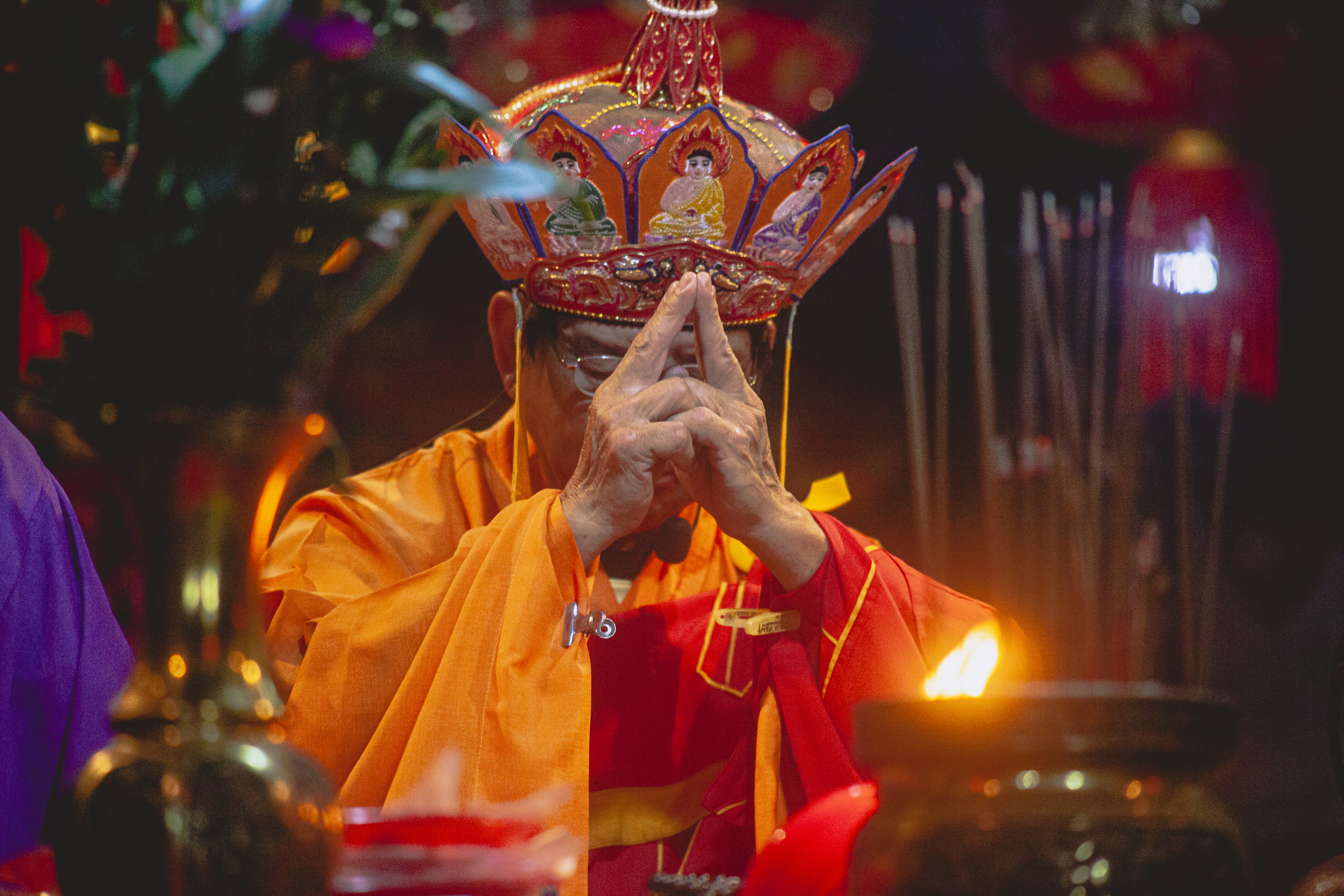
The jingang shangshi performs esoteric mudrās while wearing a Five Buddha crown adorned with images of the Five Tathāgatas.

On the altar, the main celebrant (or celebrants, if there are more than one) performs a symbolic cleansing by wiping his face with a wet towel before sitting, this also has a practical function, in that cleansing his head prevents the crown from falling off mid-ritual. The celebrant then adorns a Five Buddha crown (五佛冠, Wǔfó Guān), or Vairocana-crown (毘盧帽, Pílú Mào), which is a crown with five pointed-leaves bearing the images of the Five Tathāgatas (五方佛, Wǔfāngfó): Piluzhena Fo (Mahāvairocana), Bukong Chengjiu Fo (Amoghasiddhi), Amituofo (Amitābha), Achu Fo (Akṣobhya) and Baosheng Fo (Ratnasambhava), who are the five Buddhas that feature prominently in tantric literature. At this point in the ritual, the five pointed-leaves are fastened until the next sub-section of the rite. Once the celebrant has put on the Five Buddha crown, he uses a fachi (法尺, Fǎchǐ), which is a gavel-like percussion instrument consisting of a small block of wood, to give a signal prompting the assisting monastics to play a short solo using bells and drums. The celebrant then delivers a passage expounding the inner significance of the incense offered before he and the assistants begin an antiphonal singing of a quatrain extolling Śākyamuni Buddha’s physical virtues and the four immeasurable minds of benevolence, compassion, joy and equanimity.

==== Entering Samadhi ====
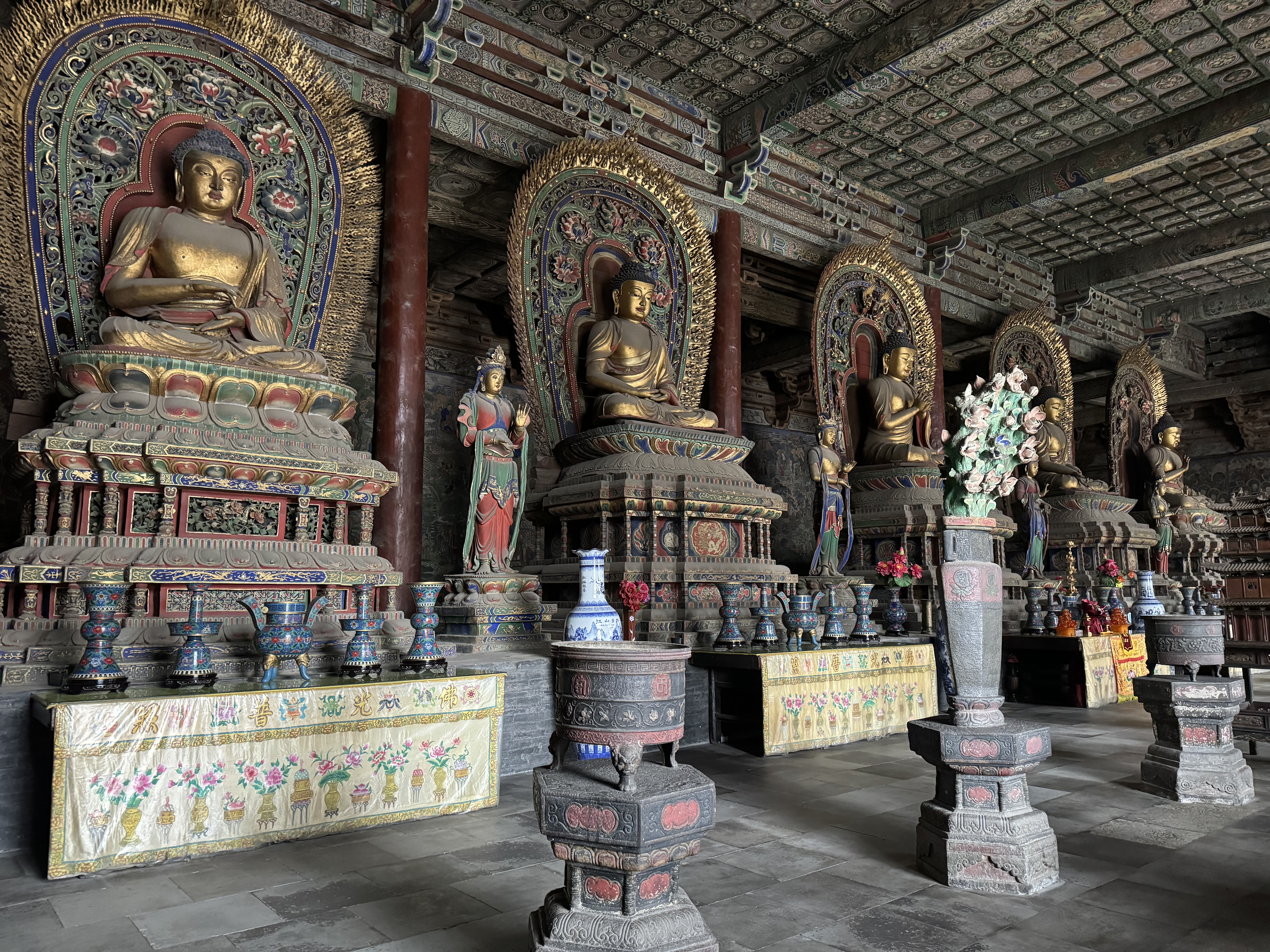
Ming dynasty (1368–1644) statues of the Five Tathāgatas in Shanhua Temple in Datong, Shanxi, China. From left to right: Baosheng Fo, Amituofo, Piluzhena Fo, Achu Fo, Bukong Chengjiu Fo.

The chorus sings a hymn praising the Five Tathāgatas while the celebrant begins empowering himself by first blessing the five-pointed leaves of the Five Buddha crown (by using ambrosia-water to trace Siddhaṃ characters on them) and then fastening the leaves. According to Zhuhong's commentary on the liturgy, not only are the Five Tathāgatas present in the crown, but the entire maṇḍala of the Thirty-seven Deities (三十七尊, Sānshíqī zūn) in the Diamond Realm (金剛界, Jīngāngjiè) described in the Vajraśekhara Sūtra is installed in the crown and will also confer their blessings and powers on the celebrant.

Using mudrās, mantras and visualization techniques, the Five Tathāgatas as well as Cundī (準提菩薩, Zhūntí Púsà) are invoked by the celebrant into the ritual space, with the celebrant and his assistants rising from their seats to welcome Piluzhena Fo to the ritual. A special hymn with various Sanskrit syllables embedded within is then sung which describes the various attributes of each of the Five Tathāgatas, while the celebrant performs further visualizations. This section then closes with specific offerings being made to the Buddhas through the recitation of offering mantras.

==== Purification ====
Liao dynasty (916 - 1125) statue of Shiyimian Guanyin (十一面觀音, Shíyīmiàn Guānyīn, lit: "Eleven-Faced Guanyin") in Dule Temple (獨樂寺, Dúlè Sì), Tianjin, China. Guanyin is the main yidam of the Yuqie Yankou.

The celebrant enters into samādhi where he or she meditates on transforming himself or herself into the form of Guanyin via seed-syllables in Siddhaṃ characters. After doing so, the celebrant maintains the “pride of Guanyin” (觀音慢, Guānyīn Màn), which is a term used to refer to the divine pride which is common in tantric practices that accompanies the identification of oneself with an enlightened being, as opposed to the mundane definition of pride as arrogance. While in this state, the celebrant will then visualize himself universally feeding all those in hunger. At the same time, the weina and the yuezhong start to antiphonally deliver passages expounding on how the non-dual nature of cause and effect is grounded in one's own Mind. The passages further elucidates how the twin acts of “benefiting oneself and others” (自利利他, Zìlì lìtā) are accomplished through universally nourishing all those in hunger within a fleeting moment. Immediately after the delivery of the passage is finished, the main celebrant responds by clearly and loudly declaring, “This is the Way.” followed immediately with the hitting of his fachi on the table.

伏以。登瑜伽顯密之座。六度齊修。開濟物利生之門。三壇等施。一心湛寂。全身總是大悲王。三業應兮。脫體俱成𠶹哩字。果然如是。則是因是果。不出自心。自利利他豈關餘物。化滴水作長河之酥酪。變微食為大地之斛食。於倏忽際。普濟大地之饑虛。在頃刻間。利益河沙之鬼趣。若也如斯會得。便當普利群機。其或未然。不免重宣妙偈。所謂道。

Translation:

Know this: By ascending the seat of Yoga—both exoteric and esoteric—we cultivate the six pāramitās in unison, opening the gate of rescue and benefit for all beings, wherein the three fields of offering are equally bestowed. With single-minded stillness, the whole body becomes the Great Compassionate Sovereign. When the three actions resonate in harmony, the body and mind embody the syllable Hṛīḥ.
Indeed, thus it is—this is cause, this is effect; none of it lies beyond one’s own mind. To benefit both self and others—how could this be bound by external means? A single drop of water transforms into a river of clarified butter; a mere morsel becomes measureless sustenance spread across the land. In but a fleeting moment, it nourishes all the famished spirits throughout the earth; in but an instant, it brings benefit to ghosts and beings as numerous as grains of sand in the Ganges.
If one has come to understand thus, then one must extend benefit to all sentient beings. But if not, let this wondrous verse be proclaimed once again.
This is the Way.

Following this, the weina and the rest of the chorus chant an antiphonal quatrain espousing the Huayan doctrine of the interpenetration and interfusion - known as yuanrong (圓融, Yuánróng) - of all phenomena. The purification process then begins with the recitation of two specific mantras, after which the celebrant delivers two quatrains praising the wisdom, eloquence and purity of Guanyin as well as her powers to dispel illnesses and aeons of calamity before requesting Guanyin to turn her attention towards humanity (人間, rénjiān) by manifesting herself. According to Shengxing's commentary, these quatrains supplicate Guanyin to emerge from her samādhi so that she can empower the water and transform it into ganlu (甘露, Gānlù), meaning amrita or ambrosia. The celebrant and his assistants then rise up from their seats as they exclaim:

觀音菩薩, 觀音菩薩, 甘露門開。

Translation:

Guanyin Bodhisattva! Guanyin Bodhisattva! The Gates of Ambrosia are open!

The "Gates of Ambrosia", known as Ganlumen (甘露門, Gānlùmén), appears in Buddhist scripture as a metaphor for the Buddhist teachings. Ganlu, the sweet nectar which bestows immortality, is often used as a metaphor for Nirvana, so the Buddhist teachings (which lead to Nirvana) is likened to the gateway to obtaining ganlu. The chief lay sponsor also rises and makes three prostrations to receive Guanyin. The celebrant then delivers more quatrains praising the qualities of the purified water as well as a passage which describes the power of the water in detail. The celebrant then pronounces that: “There is a spell in the teachings that should (now) be recited diligently.”, to which the weina responds by leading the rest of the monastics in a recitation of the Dabei zhou (大悲呪, Dàbēi zhòu), a dhāraṇī closely associated with the Thousand-Armed manifestation of Guanyin. After this, several more other mantras are chanted by the monastics in order to purify and empower both the ritual-space and the various ritual implements. A hymn is then sung praising the majestic powers of the vajras and ghantas and their ability to destroy ghosts and ghouls, turn Māra-demons away from their old ways and ultimately banish all inner and outer negativity. The hymn is sung to the accompaniment of percussions instruments while the celebrant makes ritual use of the ghantas. This section then ends with the recitation of another mantra.

==== Taking Refuge ====
With the intonation of various esoteric mantras, the celebrant, the performing monastics and the lay-sponsors all take refuge in the Three Jewels as well as the celebrant himself, now referred to as the jingang shangshi (金剛上師, Jīngāng Shàngshī, lit: "Vajrācārya"), who is identified with Guanyin and who takes on the role of a tantric guru or ācārya. The term "jinggang shangshi" itself is a literal Chinese translation of the term "vajra guru". Rice grains are used to symbolize offerings to the Three Jewels, and the assisting monastics also sing several gāthās extolling the Buddhist teachings as well as the ritual space. The account of the origins of the ritual from the Burning-Face Sūtra and the Flaming-Mouth Sūtra is then recited by the celebrant. This section closes with a hymn in praise of the Three Jewels.

==== Visualizing The Daochang ====
The celebrant recites another set of dhāraṇīs while performing different mudrās and visualizing Sanskrit syllables to banish demons of Mara from the ritual space as well as setting up a boundary around the ritual space, or daochang (道場, dàochǎng). The daochang is visualized by the celebrant as dissolving into emptiness, and Sanskrit syllables are visualized as turning into offerings. The chorus plays the percussive instruments and sing mantras relating to the offerings while the celebrant forms the different mudrās corresponding to the offerings. In this subsection, the mantra "Oṃ maṇi padme hūm̐" is also recited up to 108 times, with 108 being regarded as a sacred number in Buddhism. This is often the portion where everyone in the assembly, monastic and laypeople, participate in unison.

==== Presenting The Maṇḍala ====
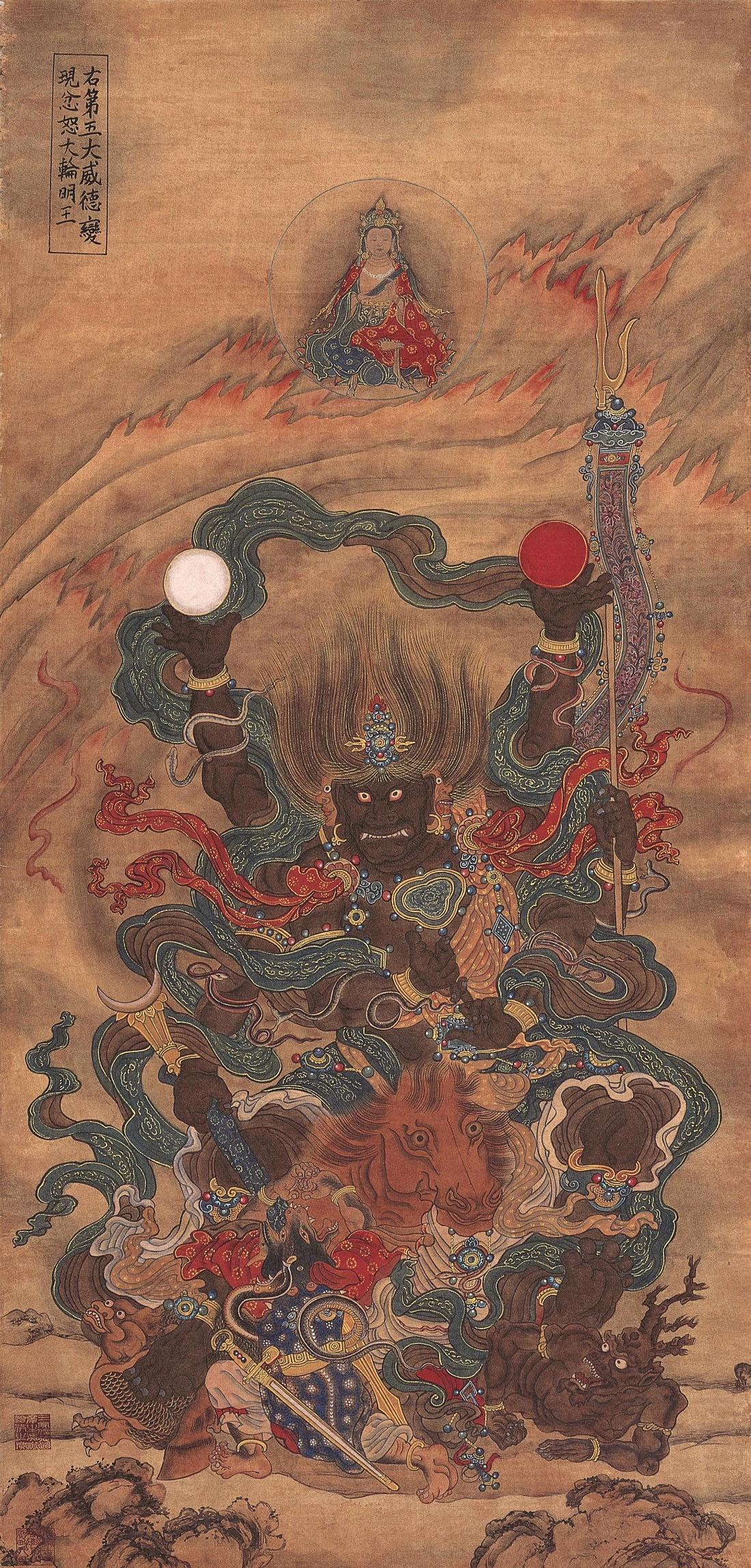
Ming dynasty (1368 - 1644) Shuilu ritual painting of the Wisdom King Mahācakra.

The celebrant recites other sets of esoteric mantras, such as the mantra of the Wisdom King Mahācakra (大輪明王, Dàlún Míngwáng), while practicing more visualizations and other ritual acts using a maṇḍala plate. An ideal universe based on the Buddhist cosmology found in Abhidharma texts such as the Abhidharmakośa, is “created” by the celebrant by the power of his visualizations, the spells recited and the corresponding ritual-acts and presented as an offering to the jingang shangshi, the Three Jewels and all other enlightened being. The assisting monastics also sing verses describing the ideal universe and recite mantras corresponding to its aspects during and after the period where the celebrant is visualizing the maṇḍala (曼荼羅, màntúluó). The celebrant then administers the refuge and bodhisattva vows to all those assembled at the rite, both the living and the dead. After generating bodhicitta, the celebrant leads the assembly in inviting the various enlightened beings and guardian gods to appear at the daochang (ritual space) out of compassion for all sentient beings.

Having invited the enlightened beings, the celebrant performs the rite of manifesting an altar through mudrās and invites the jñānasattva (meaning the true form of a deity as an aspect of enlightenment) associated with Guanyin to enter the daochang. The subsection then closes with the assembly reciting more mantras and quatrains, such as the Thirty-five Confession Buddhas, to the accompaniment of percussion instruments.

==== Universal offering ====
The Heart Sūtra, read silently rather than chanted, as well as a hymn summoning the various beings within saṃsāra to the rite and expounding the goals of the ritual are recited by the assembly. The celebrant then visualizes the six offerings of incense, lamps, (sandalwood) paste, fruits and music as the rest of the performers sing descriptive verses corresponding to the visualization. Each offering is associated with a specific goddess known as a Buddha-mother (佛母, Fómǔ), who are embodiments of the Buddha's six virtues of generosity, morality, forbearance, vigor, meditative-concentration and wisdom. More mantras and gāthās are chanted before the subsection ends.

=== Lower Section ===
==== Entering Samādhi ====
The celebrant chants several quatrains together with the chorus, offering praises and homage to the Buddha, Dharma, Sangha and Guanyin. The celebrant then meditates on transforming himself or herself into the form of Guanyin as in the Upper Section, but using a more detailed and elaborate meditation sequence in this section. This subsection closes with the rapid recitation of the “Breaking Diyu Gāthā” from the Avataṃsaka Sūtra to the accompaniment of percussions performed by hitting a wooden fish after the celebrant has successfully visualized himself or herself as fully identified with Guanyin.

==== Inviting And Summoning ====
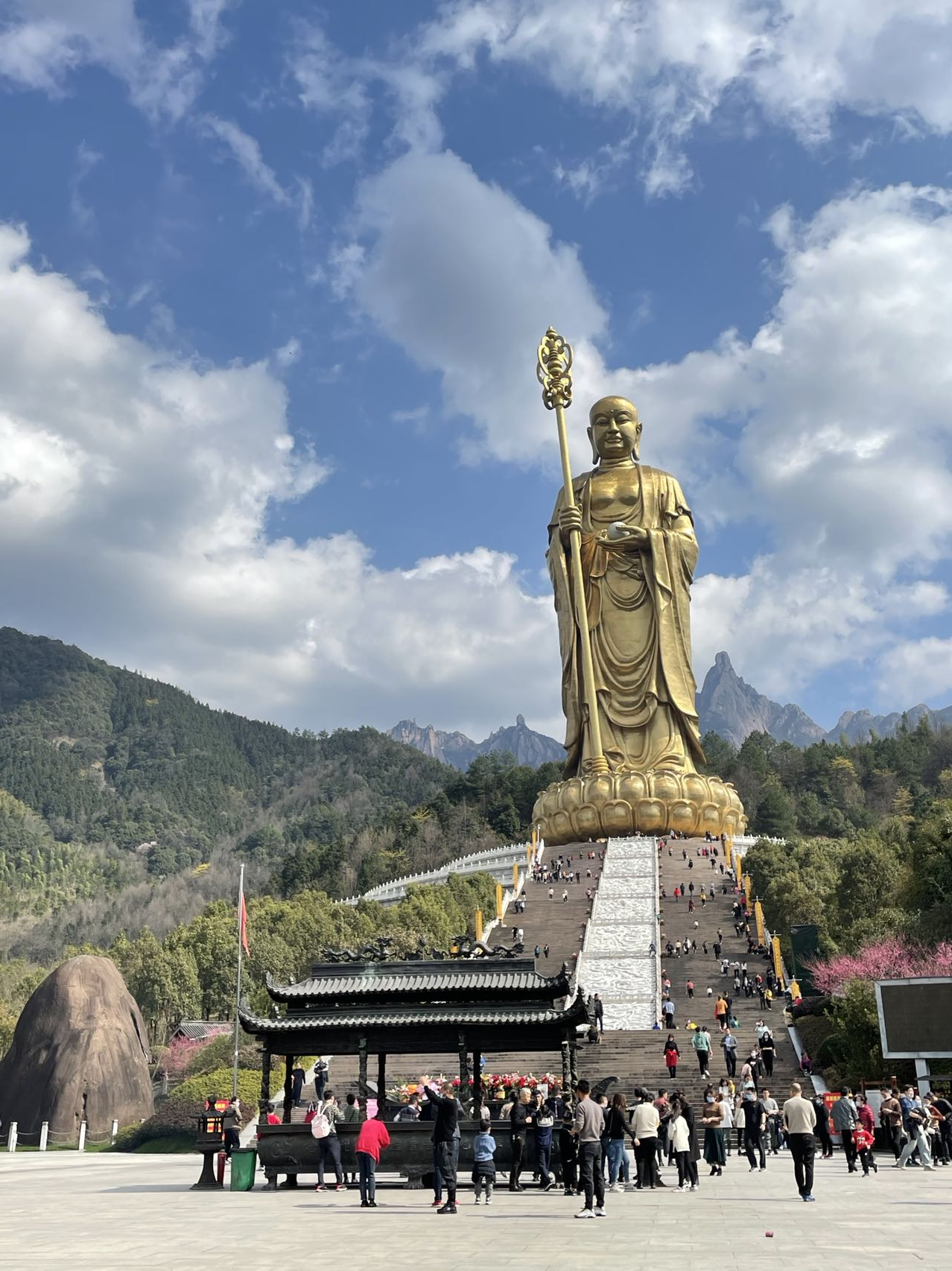
Dizang is the bodhisattva most associated with the salvation of beings who reincarnate in hell.

The celebrant continues to recite mantras while visualizing himself or herself as Guanyin breaking Diyu (the Buddhist hells) apart and freeing suffering beings. This is accompanied by the clashing of cymbals and the ringing of vajra bells by the assisting monastics. After this, the percussion ensemble reaches a cacophony, announcing and celebrating the destruction of the hells. Led by the celebrant, the performers invite and receive bodhisattvas associated with the salvation of souls in hell, including Dizang (地藏菩薩, Dìzàng Púsà) and the "Sovereign Who Leads Souls Bodhisattva" (引魂王菩薩, Yǐnhúnwáng Púsà). After this, the performers chant the formal text for summoning the different types of beings to the rite. The first type to be summoned to the rite is the orphaned souls of the emperors, kings, dukes and all members of the various royal families. This is followed by the summoning of the orphaned souls of fallen warriors, officers and generals in battles and other brave soldiers who have died. Next the orphaned souls of the civil officials, ministers and other non-military officials of the past are summoned. The next group to be summoned is the orphaned souls of the scholars and members of the Confucian literati. Other groups summoned to the rite are orphaned souls of monks and nuns, virtuous lay Buddhists, Daoist practitioners, merchants and traders, soldiers who died in battles, pregnant women killed, or those who died in childbirth, courtesans, those who died due to water, fire and other accidents, and finally the beings of the six realms of saṃsāra and the ten types of orphaned souls.

==== Exoteric food bestowal ====
The celebrant addresses all the orphaned souls that have been summoned to the rite. After admonishing the summoned orphaned souls the right decorum and deportment to adopt at the rite, the celebrant then instructs the orphaned souls to take refuge in the Buddhas and receive the Dharma-seal so that they can eventually attain enlightenment. The celebrant then instructs and leads all gathered at the daochang (ritual space) in a hymn in praise of Guanyin. As the hymn is sung, the celebrant begins to bless the platters of food-offering placed in front of him or her by tracing Sanskrit syllables written in Siddhaṃ. The hymn ends with a supplication to Guanyin. The food is then scattered into the space directly in front of the Yuqie Altar. As the celebrant begins to toss the food-offering into the space in front of him, the weina recites hymns describing the partaking of the bestowed food by the orphaned souls.

==== Eliminating impediments ====
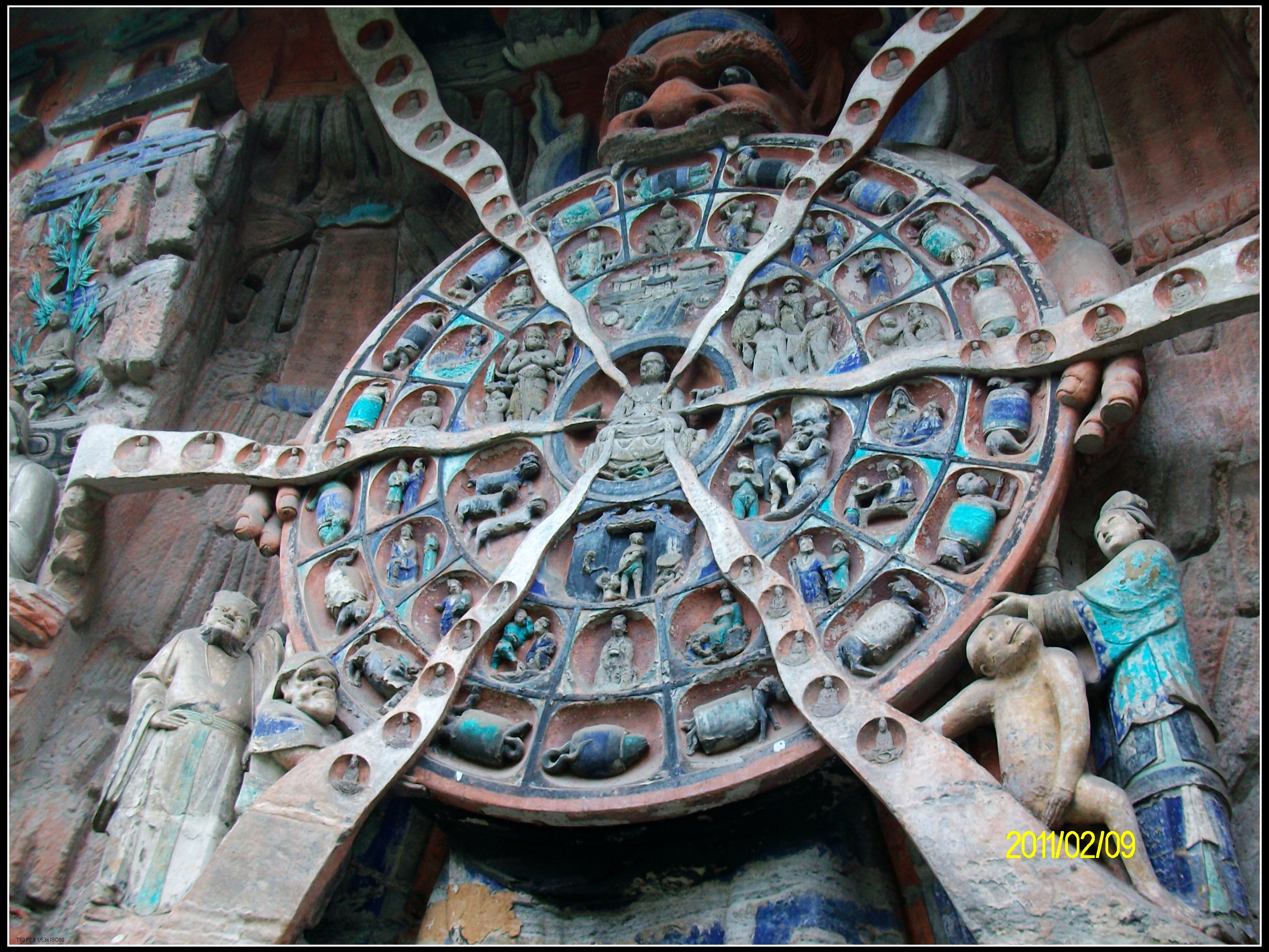
A Bhavacakra depicting the six realms of sentient beings in saṃsāra at the Dazu Rock Carvings in Chongqing, China.

In this subsection, the celebrant, supported by the weina and yuezhong, uses mantras and mudrās to invite all sentient beings in the six realms of saṃsāra: devas, humans, asuras, animals, eguis and hell-beings to the ritual space and partake of the nourishment. The celebrant chants several several other mantras and quatrains in a ritual act to eradicate the karmic offenses of the beings invited to the feast. Then, the celebrant performs a repentance ritual on behalf of the guests gathered at the feast, chanting new sets of mantras and performing more mudrās and visualizations. Finally, ambrosia is bestowed to quench the fires tormenting the eguis and their constricted throats are opened via the recitation of more mantras.

==== Esoteric Food Bestowal ====
This subsection begins with the administering of the Three Refuges to the beneficiaries of the rite, the generation of bodhicitta, followed by the transmission of the esoteric samaya precepts. All are accomplished by the celebrant and the performing monastics reciting several sets of mantras and quatrains. After this, the ambrosia-food is transformed and multiplied by the celebrant using dhāraṇīs accompanied by visualizations before being offered to the summoned beings.

==== Transference of merit ====
The monastics perform a prose addressed to the guests of the rite, admonishing them not to constantly crave after ordinary food obtained through the trading of livestock, food associated with blood and flesh, alcohol and the pungent plants while encouraging them to rely on the Dharma-food that that has been bestowed at the rite, which facilitates the generation of the bodhicitta and ultimately leads to the attainment of Buddhahood for the sake of all sentient beings. The prose then invites everyone at the rite to transfer all the merits gained from the performance of the ritual to “the unexcelled Bodhi”. The assembly next recites the Uṣṇīṣa Vijaya Dhāraṇī while the attendant monastic uses rice grains to perform a ritual act that rouses all the ghosts and spirits into quickly taking rebirth in Amituofo's Pure Land of Sukhāvatī. More hymns and verses are then recited. At the closing of the rite, a final mantra and mudrā is performed by the celebrant to send off the summoned beings. Accordingly, then, Buddhas, bodhisattvas and other enlightened beings return to their respective pure lands while the unenlightened beings of the six realms are released or liberated from their respective states of ignorance and suffering. The celebrant then delivers a prose section to expound on how sentient beings give rise to delusions or the false from the True and remove the Five Buddha crown. All participants then recite the Hundred Syllable Mantra of Vajrasattva (金剛薩埵菩薩, Jīngāngsàduǒ Púsà) and the celebrant delivers a final pronouncement. In this subsection, ritual exclamations deriving from gong'an practices associated with the Yunmen school of Chan are also incorporated into the liturgy.

=== Closing ===
All participants then descend from the Yuqie Altar and processes to the front of the Mianran Altar while chanting homages to Amituofo. At the Mianran Altar, the placards bearing the names of the beneficiaries of the rite are removed together with the placard with the name of Mianran Dashi. All participants then walk to an open space where the placards are set on fire while the Heart Sūtra is recited as the fire burns. The monastics and laity then return to the Yuqie Altar. Together facing the Yuqie Altar, both monastic and lay participants sing a general hymn of dedication of merit and a dedicatory hymn of taking refuge in the Three Jewels accompanied with the full percussive ensemble. As they finish the last prayers, the food offered at the Mianran Altar is quickly distributed to all those who participated in the rite.

== See also ==
- Shuilu Fahui
- Chan Buddhism
- Chinese Esoteric Buddhism
- Deity yoga
