= Dinghu =

Dinghu may refer to the following locations in China:

- Dinghu District (鼎湖区), Zhaoqing, Guangdong
- Dinghu Mountain (鼎湖山), in Zhaoqing, Guangdong
- Dinghu, Anhui (丁湖镇), town in Si County
- Dinghu, Hunan (定湖镇), town in Linxiang
- Dinghu, Jiangxi (鼎湖镇), town in Anyi County
