= Ulkāmukha Pretarāja =

Buddhist deity regarded as a manifestation of the Bodhisattva Guanyin

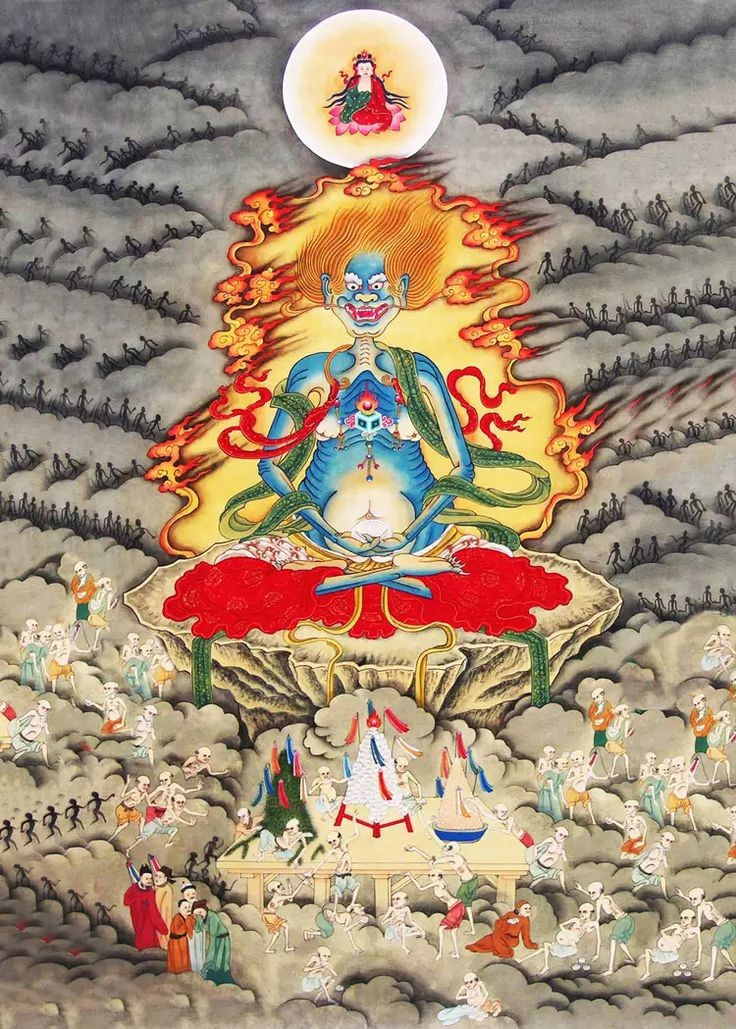
Ming dynasty painting of Ulkāmukha Pretarāja from Baoning Temple.

Ulkāmukha Pretarāja (Chinese: 焰口鬼王; pinyin: Yànkǒu Guǐwáng; lit. 'Flaming-Mouth Ghost King'), also known as Mianran Dashi (面燃大士) or Dashiye (大士爺), is a figure in Chinese Buddhism and Chinese folk religion. He appears in Buddhist scriptures as a hungry ghost who warns Ananda of his approaching death. In later Chinese traditions, he is worshipped as a ghost king who watches over wandering spirits during the Ghost Festival. Some traditions identify him as a form of Guanyin, while others say that he was a ghost king brought under her control.

== Etymology ==
The Sanskrit word Ulkāmukha means "fire-mouthed". It has been suggested as the original form of the Chinese name Yankou (焰口, "Flaming Mouth"). Another possible Sanskrit name is Jvālāmukha. The original Sanskrit name is uncertain, as no Sanskrit version of the related Buddhist scriptures is known to survive. Pretarāja means "king of hungry ghosts".

== Iconography ==
In Taiwan, Dashiye is often shown with a blue-green face, two horns, long fangs, and a large tongue. Some figures have flames coming from their mouths. He wears armor and carries a ritual flag. A small image of Guanyin is usually placed on his head. In local belief, this represents his identity as a form of Guanyin or as a ghost king brought under her control.

The figures differ by region. Most paper effigies are shown standing, but the Dashiye of Minxiong in Chiayi County is seated. Its head can move when the wind blows. In Penghu, some paper figures are made with a mount.

At the Hsinpu Yimin Festival in Hsinchu County, one paper effigy was made with a gold ball in its left hand and a yellow flag in its right. The flag carried the words Hejing Ping'an (合境平安, "Peace for the Whole Community").

== In Buddhist scriptures ==
The Flaming-Faced Ghost appears in several Buddhist scriptures from the Tang dynasty. The Sutra on the Dharani for Saving the Flaming-Mouthed Hungry Ghosts (佛說救拔焰口餓鬼陀羅尼經) and the Yoga Compendium: Dharani for Saving Ananda and the Flaming-Mouthed Ritual (瑜伽集要救阿難陀羅尼焰口軌儀經) name Amoghavajra as their translator. The Sutra on the Dharani and Divine Mantra for Saving the Flaming-Faced Hungry Ghosts names Śikṣānanda as its translator. The ghost is called Yankou (焰口, "Flaming Mouth") in the first two texts and Mianran (面然, "Flaming Face") in the third.

One night, Ananda was alone when a hungry ghost appeared before him. The ghost had a thin body, a narrow throat, long claws, and flames coming from its mouth or face. It warned Ananda that he would die in three days and be reborn as a hungry ghost. To escape this fate, he had to offer food to countless hungry ghosts, Brahmins, and sages, and make offerings to the Three Jewels. The ghost also asked Ananda to make an offering for it so that it could escape its suffering and be reborn in heaven.

Frightened, Ananda went to the Buddha for help. The Buddha taught him a dhāraṇī that could turn a small amount of food into enough to feed countless hungry ghosts. The sutra says that the Buddha had learned the dhāraṇī from Avalokiteśvara and another Buddha in a previous life. The offerings could free the ghosts from their suffering and help them be reborn in heaven. Those who performed the ritual could gain merit and a longer life.

In the Sutra on the Dharani for Saving the Flaming-Mouthed Hungry Ghosts, food and water are placed in a clean bowl, and the dhāraṇī is recited seven times. The names of four Buddhas are then recited. Each Buddha is said to help hungry ghosts by removing stinginess, restoring their appearance, opening their narrow throats, or freeing them from fear. The person then snaps their fingers seven times and pours the food onto clean ground.

Food can also be offered to Brahmins and sages by reciting the dhāraṇī fourteen times and pouring the offering into flowing water. Offerings to the Three Jewels include flowers, incense, and food, with the dhāraṇī recited twenty-one times. The Yoga Compendium: Dharani for Saving Ananda and the Flaming-Mouthed Ritual also includes offerings for deceased relatives, underworld officials, and other spirits.

== Later traditions ==
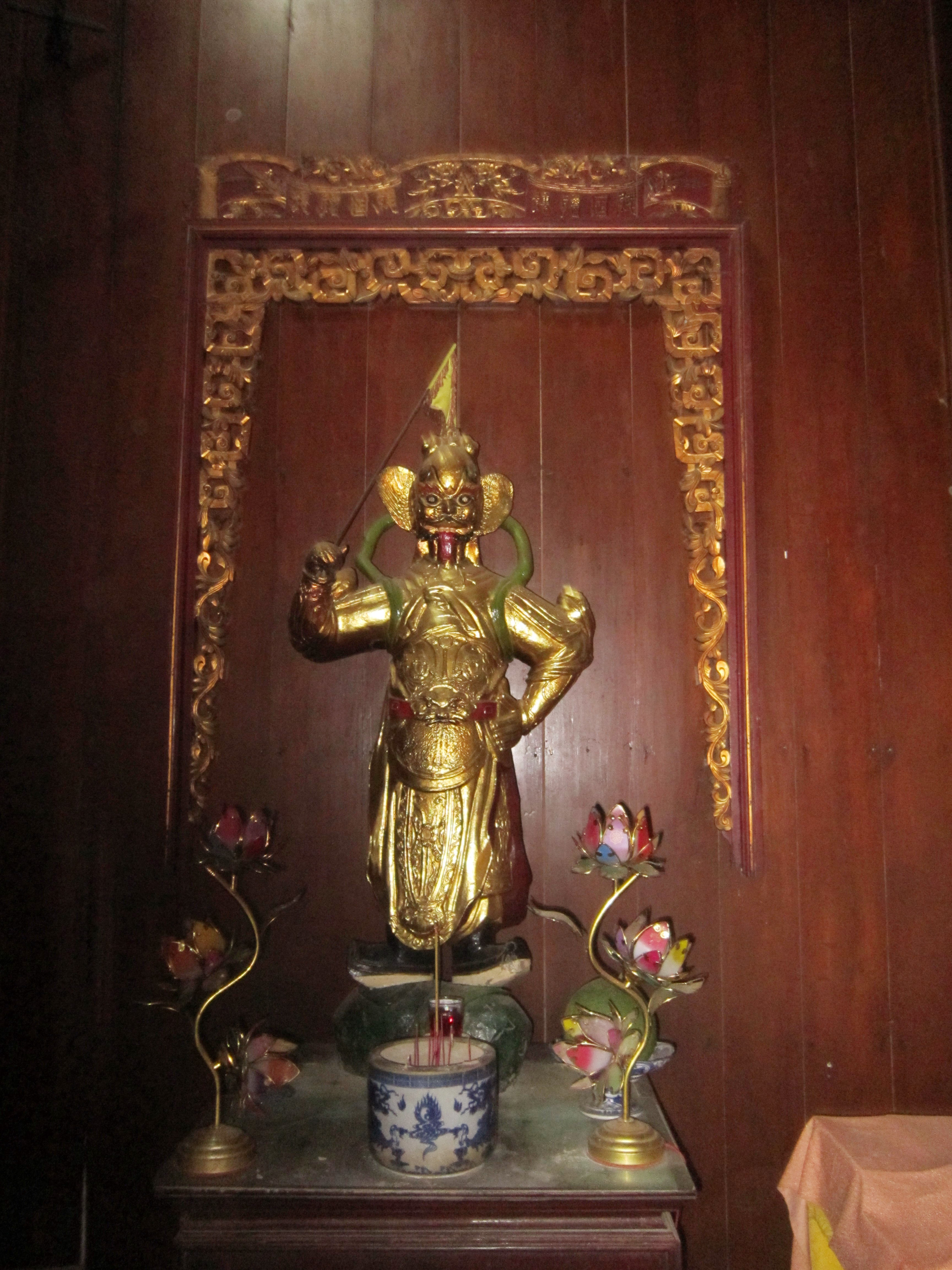
Statue of the Flaming-Faced Ghost King.

In Chinese folk religion, the Flaming-Faced Ghost became known as Mianran Dashi (面燃大士) or Dashiye (大士爺). Some traditions identify him as a form of Guanyin, who took the appearance of a fierce ghost to control hungry ghosts. Others say that he was once a ghost king who was brought under Guanyin's control. He is worshipped during the Ghost Festival, when offerings are made to the dead and wandering spirits.

In Taiwan, a large paper figure of Dashiye is often placed near the offerings during the Ghost Festival. He has a fierce face, horns, fangs, and a suit of armor. A small image of Guanyin sits on his head. He is believed to keep hungry ghosts under control and stop them from fighting over food. Some Hakka communities in northern Taiwan make paper figures as tall as a building.

In some places, a paper mountain called Dashi Shan (大士山) or Putuoshan (普陀山) is made instead of a figure of Dashiye. It represents the home of Guanyin. The mountain may show Guanyin at the top, Dashiye in the middle, and Tang Sanzang and his disciples from Journey to the West below. Some festivals use both the mountain and the figure of Dashiye.

== Worship ==
In Chinese Buddhism, the Yujia Yankou ritual is held to feed hungry ghosts and pray for the dead. Monks offer food, recite dhāraṇīs, and perform hand gestures during the ceremony. The ritual is also performed during the Ghost Festival.

In Vietnamese Buddhism, he is called Tiêu Diện Đại Sĩ or Ông Ác ("Fierce Guardian"). He is worshipped as a Dharma protector, often alongside Skanda, known in Vietnam as Vi Đà or Ông Thiện ("Good Guardian"). Their statues are commonly placed on opposite sides of a Buddhist temple's main hall.

Some Taoist traditions identify the Flaming-Faced Ghost King as a form of Taiyi Jiuku Tianzun (太乙救苦天尊). In these accounts, he lives at the foot of Mount Wojiao (沃焦山) and rules over ghosts in the underworld. During the seventh lunar month, he oversees the offerings made to wandering spirits.

In Malaysia, Dashiye is worshipped during the Ghost Festival to keep wandering spirits under control. Some figures carry a tablet bearing the words Fen Yi Shi Shi (分衣施食, "Distribute Clothing and Food"). The words remind worshippers to share food and clothing with those in need.

In Taiwan, Dashiye is worshipped at Dashiye Temple (大士爺廟) in Minxiong Township, Chiayi County. The temple also worships Guanyin, who is the main deity of its front hall. A wooden statue of Dashiye was installed in 2006. The temple holds its annual Ghost Festival ceremonies from the 21st to the 23rd day of the seventh lunar month.

Dashiye is also the main god of Longhu Temple (龍湖廟) in Xiaogang District, Kaohsiung. Its Ghost Festival ceremonies are held on the 14th and 15th days of the seventh lunar month. A large paper figure of Dashiye is carried through the neighbourhood before being placed in the temple. Lanterns are taken to the harbour to guide the spirits of those who died at sea. The paper figure is burned at the end of the ceremonies.

== Yulanpen Festival ==
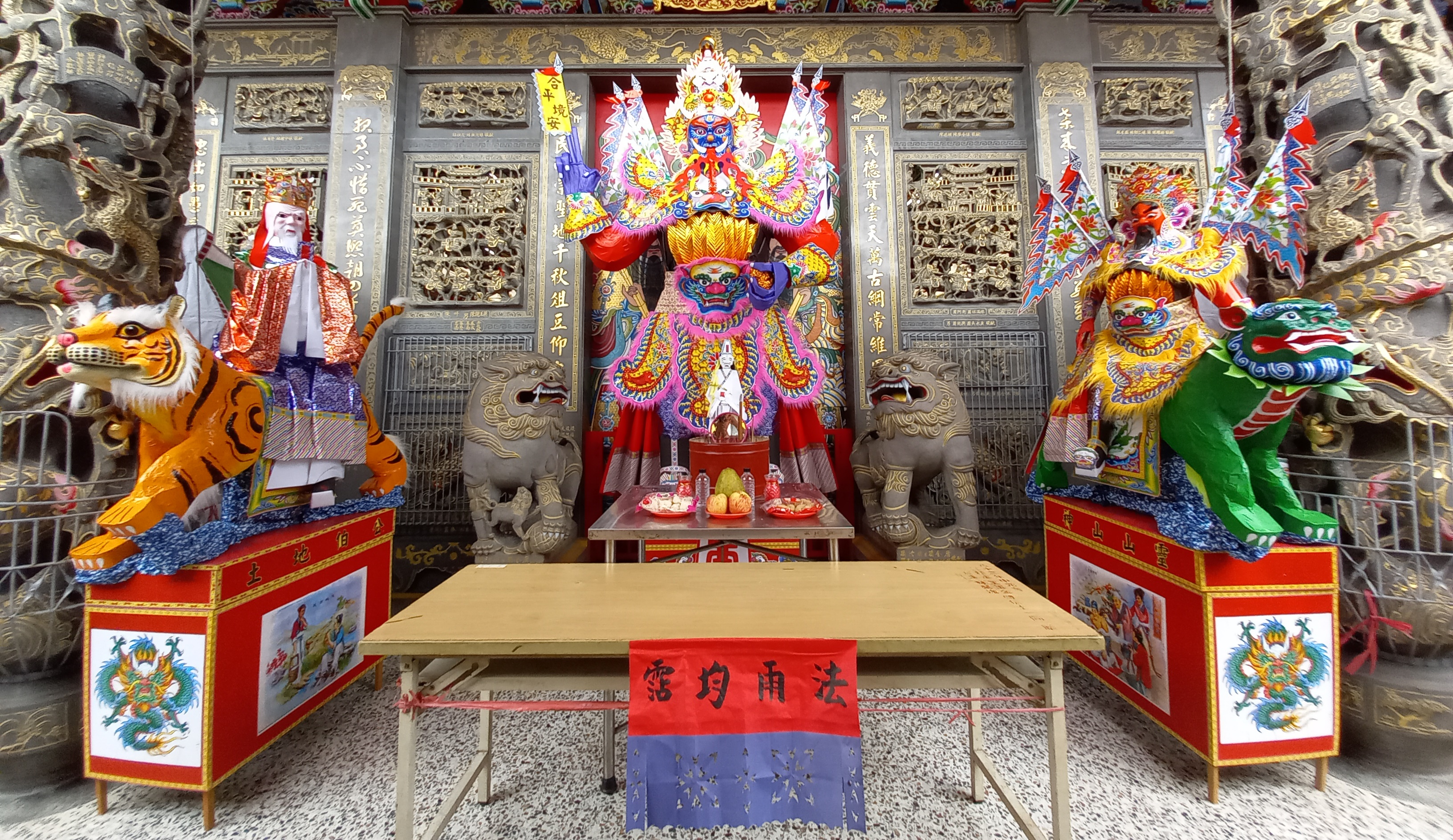
A paper effigy of Ulkāmukha Pretarāja at Toufen Yimin Temple.

During the Ghost Festival, Dashiye is also called Pudu Gong (普渡公) in some Taiwanese traditions. Worshippers make offerings to him before offering food to wandering spirits. At larger ceremonies, a paper effigy of Dashiye is placed near the offerings, often with figures of the Mountain God and Earth God. Dashiye is believed to keep the spirits in order while they receive the food.

In Bukit Mertajam, Penang, Malaysia, a large paper effigy of Dashiye is made each year for the Zhongyuan Festival at Pek Kong Cheng (伯公埕). It is placed in the Dashiye Hall (大士爺殿), where people come to worship. The effigy has grown taller over the years. In 2019, it stood 27 feet 7 inches tall, while the figure made in 2026 was 29 feet 2 inches tall. The festival lasts for 15 days, from the third to the seventeenth day of the seventh lunar month.

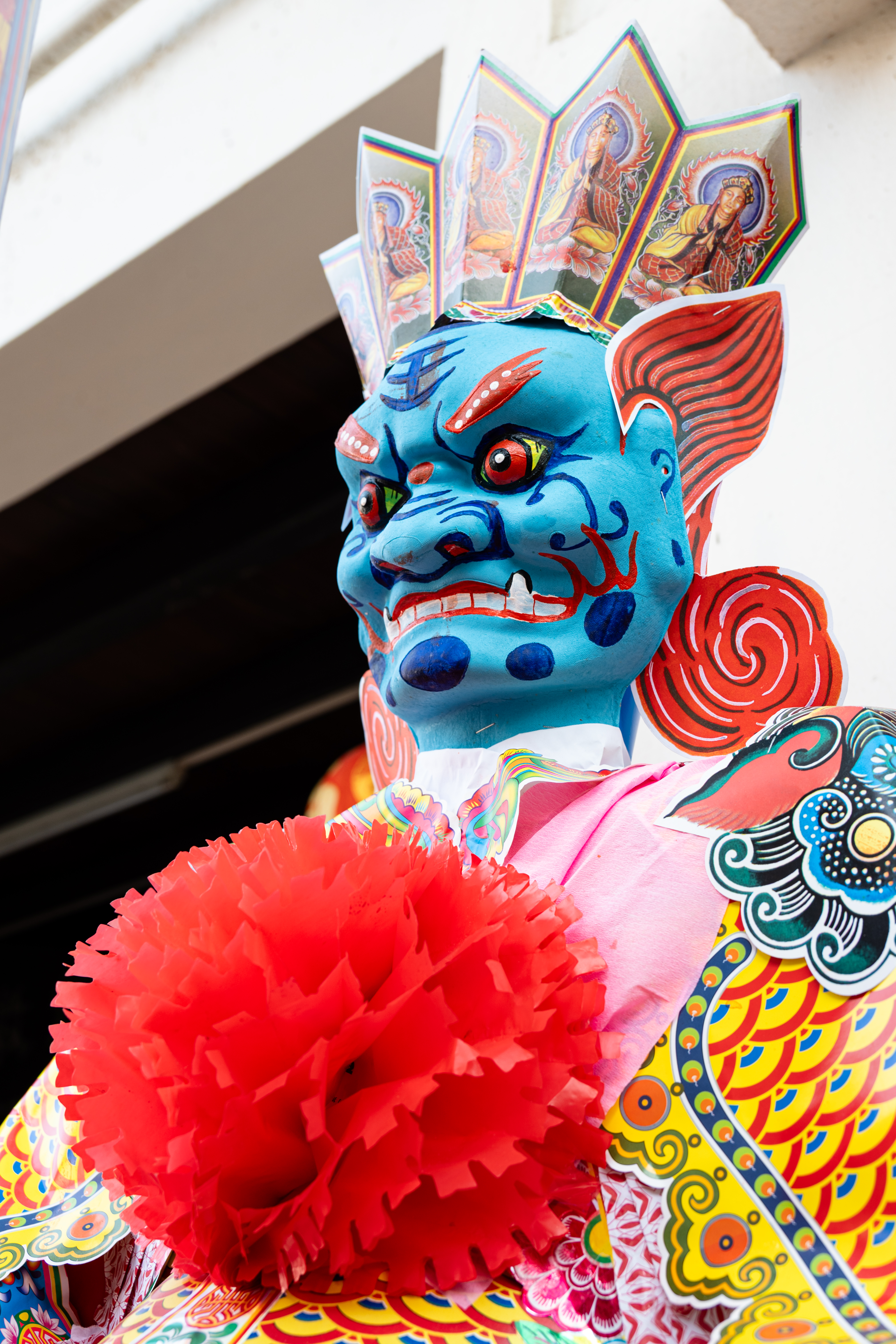
A Mianran Dashi effigy displayed during the Yulanpen Festival in Singapore.

At the end of the festival, the effigy is carried from the hall to a nearby street for burning. The small image of Guanyin on its head is removed before the fire is lit. In local belief, the direction in which the burning effigy falls shows which part of the town will enjoy good fortune in the coming year. In 2026, the effigy remained upright as it burned, which worshippers took as a sign of good fortune in all directions.

The burning of Dashiye's paper effigy is called Song Dashi (送大士, "Sending Off Dashiye") in some communities. Paper figures of other gods, including the Mountain God and Earth God, may also be burned. Gold Mountain (金山) and Silver Mountain (銀山) are paper models of mountains covered with gold- or silver-coloured foil. They represent wealth offered to the dead and are burned with other paper offerings at the end of the ceremony.

In Hong Kong, the Central Thirty Houses Yulan Festival (中區卅間街坊盂蘭勝會) has a ritual called Da Dashi Wang (打大士王, "Striking the Ghost King"). A paper figure of Dashi Wang is placed at the festival altar with an image of Guanyin on its chest. At the end of the ceremony, the Guanyin image is removed. Six men then strike the paper figure with long poles until it breaks apart. The remains are burned with other paper offerings. The ritual is believed to drive away wandering spirits that may still be attached to the figure.
