= Longchang Temple =

Buddhist temple in Jiangsu, China

- 隆昌寺
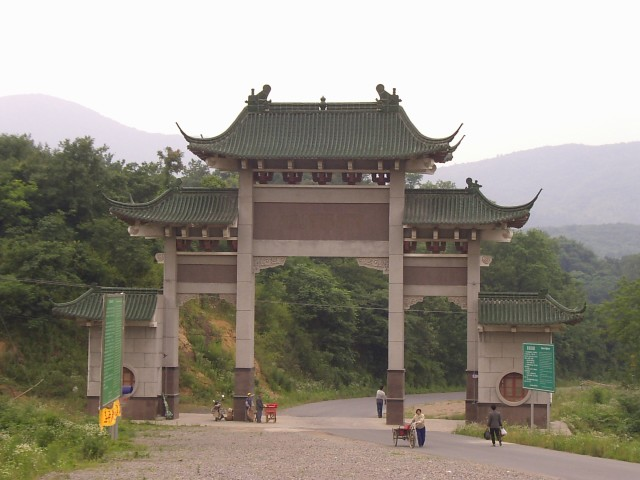
- A paifang at Longchang Temple

- Location within Jiangsu

Religion
- Affiliation: Buddhism

Location
- Location: Baohua Town, Jurong, Jiangsu
- Country: China
- Interactive map of Longchang Temple
- Coordinates: 32°08′03″N 119°05′48″E

Architecture
- Style: Chinese architecture
- Founder: Baozhi (宝志)
- Established: 502

Longchang Temple (Chinese: 隆昌寺; pinyin: Lóngchāng Sì) is a Buddhist temple located on Mount Baohua, in Baohua Town of Jurong, Jiangsu, China. It is the important monastery in the Chinese Buddhist Vinaya tradition. The temple is renowned not only for its Copper Hall and Beamless Halls, but also for the 400-years-old ginkgo trees.

== History ==
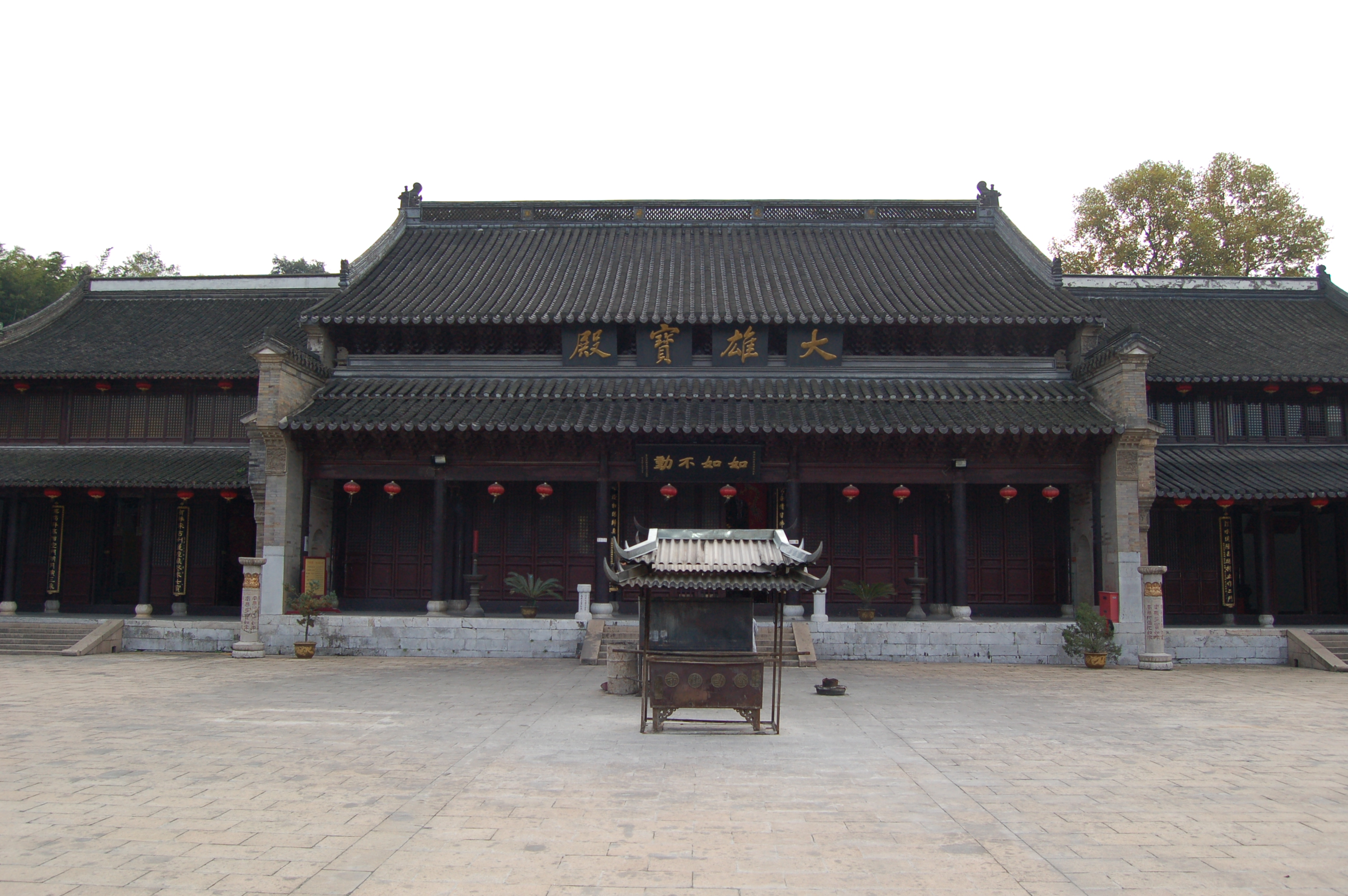
The Mahavira Hall at Longchang Temple.

The temple was originally built by monk Baozhi (宝志) in 502 as "Qianhua Temple" (千华寺), under the Liang dynasty (502–557).

In the reign of Wanli Emperor of the Ming dynasty (1368–1644), the emperor bestowed a set of Chinese Buddhist canon on the temple and renamed it "Huguo Shenghua Longchang Temple" (护国圣化隆昌寺), more commonly known as "Longchang Temple".

During the Qing dynasty (1644–1911), Kangxi Emperor and Qianlong Emperor came to the temple to worship Buddha and offer incenses, which elevated its position and attracted more people to offer incenses.

Longchang Temple has been inscribed as a National Key Buddhist Temple in Han Chinese Area in 1983.

In March 2013, the Copper Hall and Beanless Halls were designated as "Major National Historical and Cultural Sites in Jiangsu" by the State Council of China.

== Architecture ==
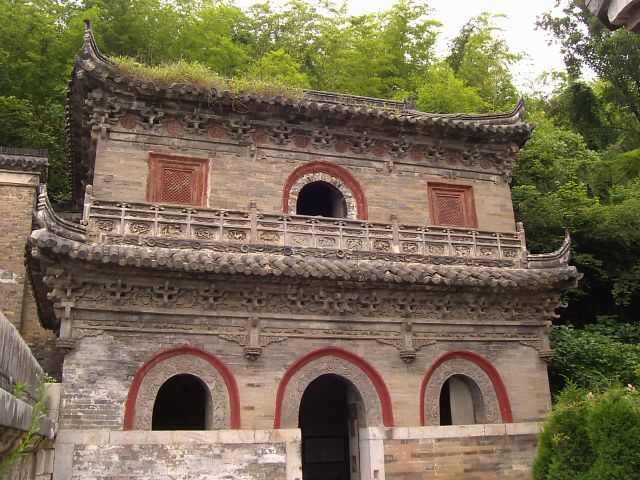
The Beamless Hall at Longchang Temple.

=== Copper Hall ===
In 1605, in the late Ming dynasty (1368–1644), Empress Dowager Xiaoding donated two thousand taels of gold to establish the Copper Hall (铜殿). The hall is 7 metres (23 ft) high, 4.5 metres (15 ft) wide and 4 metres (13 ft) deep with double-eaves gable and hip roof. Statues of Guanyin are enshrined in the hall.

=== Beamless Halls ===
The Beamless Halls (无梁殿) was also built in 1605. They situated at both sides of the Copper Hall. The left Beamless Hall enshrining the statue of Wenshu and the right Beamless Hall enshrining the statue of Puxian. Each of them are 7.62 metres (25.0 ft) wide and 5.62 metres (18.4 ft) deep with single-eave gable and hip roof. It is called "Beamless Hall" since it is built without pillars or columns.

=== Hall of Ordination ===
The Hall of Ordination or Jietan Hall (戒坛殿) is the most important hall in the temple. In 1705, in the 43rd year of Kangxi period in the Qing dynasty (1644–1911), master Yuejian (见月) designed the stone carving ordination altar.

=== Mahavira Hall ===
A 5.24-metre (17.2 ft) high statue of Shijiamouni is enshrined in the Mahavira Hall. The statue modeled the statue of Tian Tan Buddha. It was presented by Baolian Temple in Hong Kong.

== Television ==
In June 2015, Longchang Temple served as a shooting location for the CCTV documentary One Hundred Buddhist Temples in China.
