= Qingyun Temple (Guangdong) =

Buddhist temple in Zhaoqing, China

- 慶雲寺
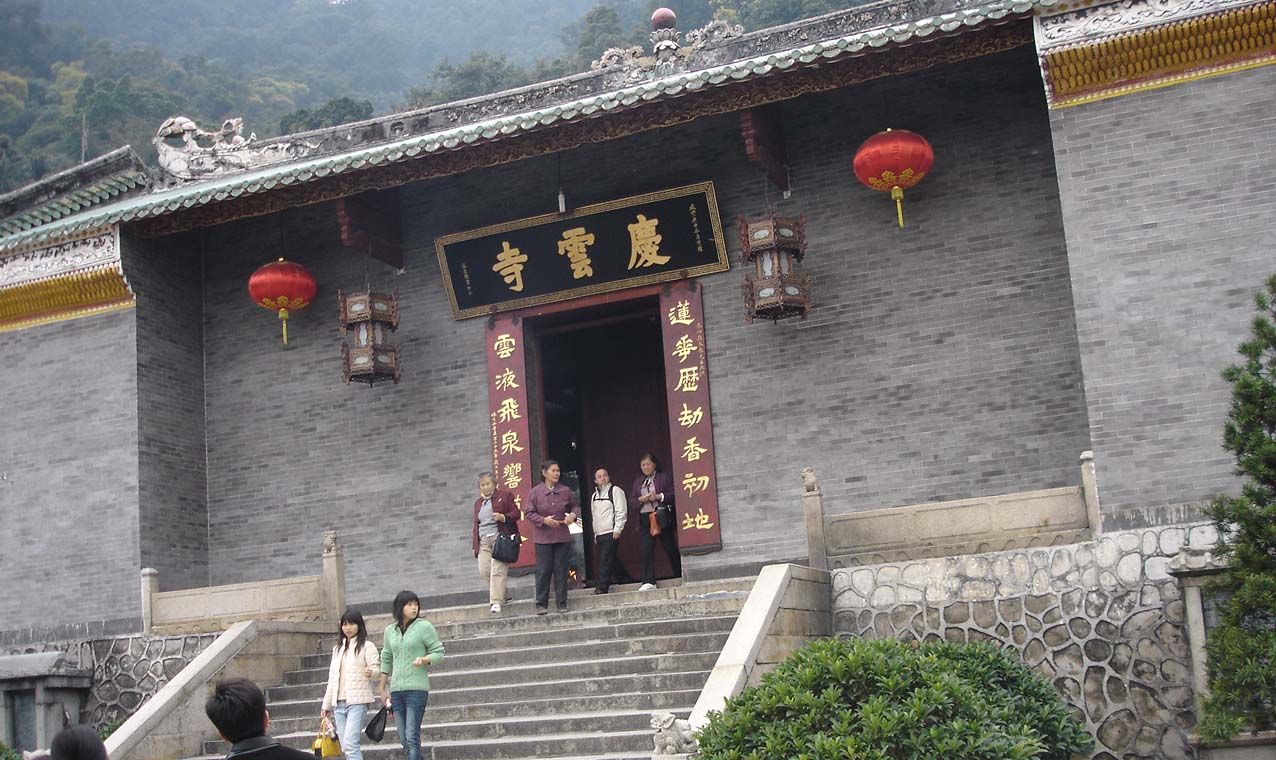

- Location within Guangdong Location within China

Religion
- Affiliation: Buddhism
- Sect: Chan Buddhism
- Leadership: Shi Chunjie (释纯洁)

Location
- Location: Dinghu District, Zhaoqing, Guangdong
- Country: China
- Interactive map of Qingyun Temple
- Coordinates: 23°10′30″N 112°33′09″E

Architecture
- Style: Chinese architecture
- Founder: Shi Qihe (释栖壑)
- Established: 1636
- Completed: 1636

Qingyun Temple (simplified Chinese: 庆云寺; traditional Chinese: 慶雲寺; pinyin: Qìngyún Sì; Jyutping: Hing3 Wan4 Zi6*2) is a Buddhist temple located in Dinghu District, Zhaoqing, Guangdong, China.

== History ==
=== Ming dynasty ===
The temple traces its origins to the former Lianhua'an (蓮花庵; 'Temple of Lotus'), founded by Shi Zaisan (釋在犙) in 1633 and would later become Qingyun Temple in 1636. In 1635, Shi Qihe (释栖壑) was invited to serve as abbot. He supervised the construction of the temple. After completing in 1636, the temple had over 100 halls and buildings and a total area of 12,000 metres (39,000 ft).

=== Qing dynasty ===
In 1649, Emperor Yongli of the Southern Ming dynasty and his mother visited the temple.

In 1670, Shang Zhixiao, son of Shang Kexi, donated property to establish the dining hall, Drum tower and Bell tower.

Qingyun Temple was devastated by wars in 1860, during the Xianfeng era.

In 1893, in the reign of Guangxu Emperor, master Xianchun (獻純) brought 5,048 volumes of sutras to the temple. Empress Dowager Cixi inscribed and honored the name "Wanshou Qingyun Temple" (萬壽慶雲寺).

=== Republic of China ===
A fire in 1916 destroyed most of the buildings.

In 1923, Sun Yat-sen visited the temple.

=== People's Republic of China ===
Qingyun Temple has been designated as a National Key Buddhist Temple in Han Chinese Area by the State Council of China in 1983.

== Architecture ==
Qingyun Temple preserves the architectural style of the Qing dynasty. Main structures from the Hall of Skanda to the Hall of Pagoda are aligned with the central axis and divided into five courtyards. At the very front are Hall of Skanda, followed by the Mahavira Hall, and finally the Hall of Pagoda in the rear. On both sides of the central axis are Bell Tower, Drum Tower, Reception Hall, Pilu Hall, Buddhist Texts Library, Seven Buddha Hall and ring-rooms.
