= Dinghu, Zhaoqing =

Dinghu 鼎湖区
- District
- Dinghu

- Location in Guangdong
- Coordinates: 23°11′15″N 112°33′51″E
- Country: People's Republic of China
- Province: Guangdong
- Prefecture-level city: Zhaoqing

Area
  - Total: 596 km^{2} (230 sq mi)

Population (2020)
  - Total: 209,116
  - Density: 351/km^{2} (909/sq mi)
- Time zone: UTC+8 (China Standard)

Dinghu District (Chinese: 鼎湖; pinyin: Dǐnghú; Jyutping: ding^{2}wu^{4}) is a district of Zhaoqing, Guangdong province, People's Republic of China.

== Administrative divisions ==
Name	Chinese (S)	Hanyu Pinyin	Population (2010)	Area (km^{2})
Kengkou Subdistrict	坑口街道	Kēngkǒu Jiēdào	22,406	95.5
Guicheng Subdistrict	桂城街道	Guìchéng Jiēdào	29,930	23.3
Guangli Subdistrict	广利街道	Guǎnglì Jiēdào	25,775	28
Yong'an town	永安镇	Yǒng'ān Zhèn	29,732	80.5
Shapu town	沙浦镇	Shāpǔ Zhèn	15,598	105.8
Fenghuang town	凤凰镇	Fènghuáng Zhèn	9,110	145
Lianhua town	莲花镇	Liánhuā Zhèn	32,139	67

== See also ==
- Dinghu Mountain
- Qingyun Temple (Guangdong)
