= Dinghu Mountain =

Mountain in Guangdong, China

Coordinates: 23.159498°N 112.556562°E

- Chinese: 鼎湖山
Transcriptions
Standard Mandarin
- Hanyu Pinyin: Dǐnghúshān
Yue: Cantonese
- Jyutping: Ding^{2}wu^{4}saan^{1}

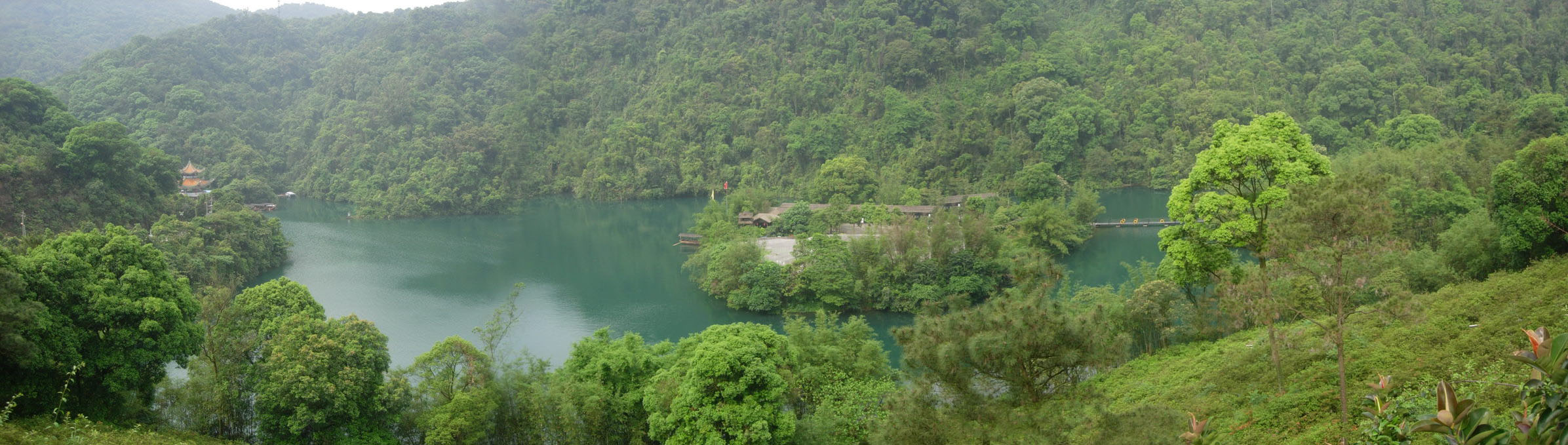
Scenery of Dinghu Mountain

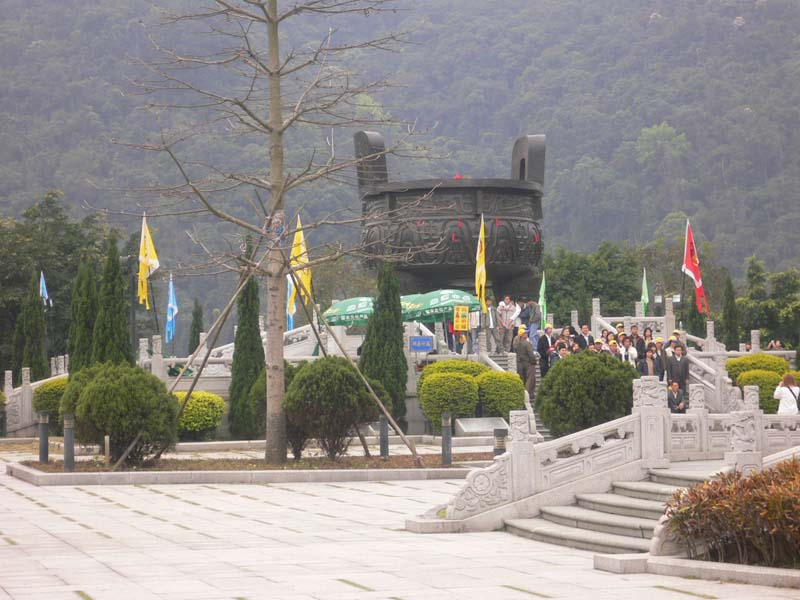
Dinghu Mountain

Dinghu Mountain and Lake (Chinese: 鼎湖山) is located in Dinghu District, 18 km to the east of Zhaoqing City, in the Dayunwu Mountain Range, in Guangdong Province of southern China. It is one of the four famous mountains - Danxia, Dinghu, Xiqiao and Luofu in Guangdong province.

The mountain's peaks rise above ancient towering trees, flying waterfalls, fresh air, various birds and colorful flowers. Since ancient times, it has been a tourist attraction and a Buddhist sacred place. Its shrines attract up to 1 million visitors per year (1997).

== Conservation ==
The Dinghu Mountain National Nature Reserve, established in 1956, was the first nature reserve in China. It is also among the first group of designated scientific research stations of the UNESCO "Man and Natural Biosphere" (since 1979).

== Flora and fauna ==
Dinghu Mountain is known as a living nature museum and a green treasure house. With abundant plant species, it is home to over 500 species of plants, including 23 rare species in imminent danger under state protection. It is also home to various kinds of animals, including 178 species of birds and 38 species of mammals, 15 species of which are under state protection.

== Geography and features ==
Dinghu Mountain has been well known for its deep and serene gorges, cold and clean waters, major scenic areas. Heavenly Brook-Qingyun Scenic Area includes the Hundred Buddha Cave, Green Trees Surrounded by Clouds, Flying Waterfalls of the Dragon Pond, and Double Rainbows, among others. The Dinghu-Tianhu Scenic Area features the Black Dragon Playing Pearls, Dragon Mother Borrowing a Vessel, Exploring the Heavenly Lake, and so on; and Yunxi-Laoding Scenic Area has the traces of bottle gourds, Water Curtain Cave, Dragon Hidden in the Ancient Pond, White Clouds Embracing Ancient Trees.

== Religious significance ==
Dinghu Mountain is also considered a Buddhist sacred site as it was the location of the "finest" Buddhist monastery built in 17th century South China, according to Timothy Brook. This monastery was erected by Zhu Ziren in the late Ming dynasty.

== See also ==
- Environment of China
