= Yaoshi Bao Chan =

Chinese Buddhist repentance ritual

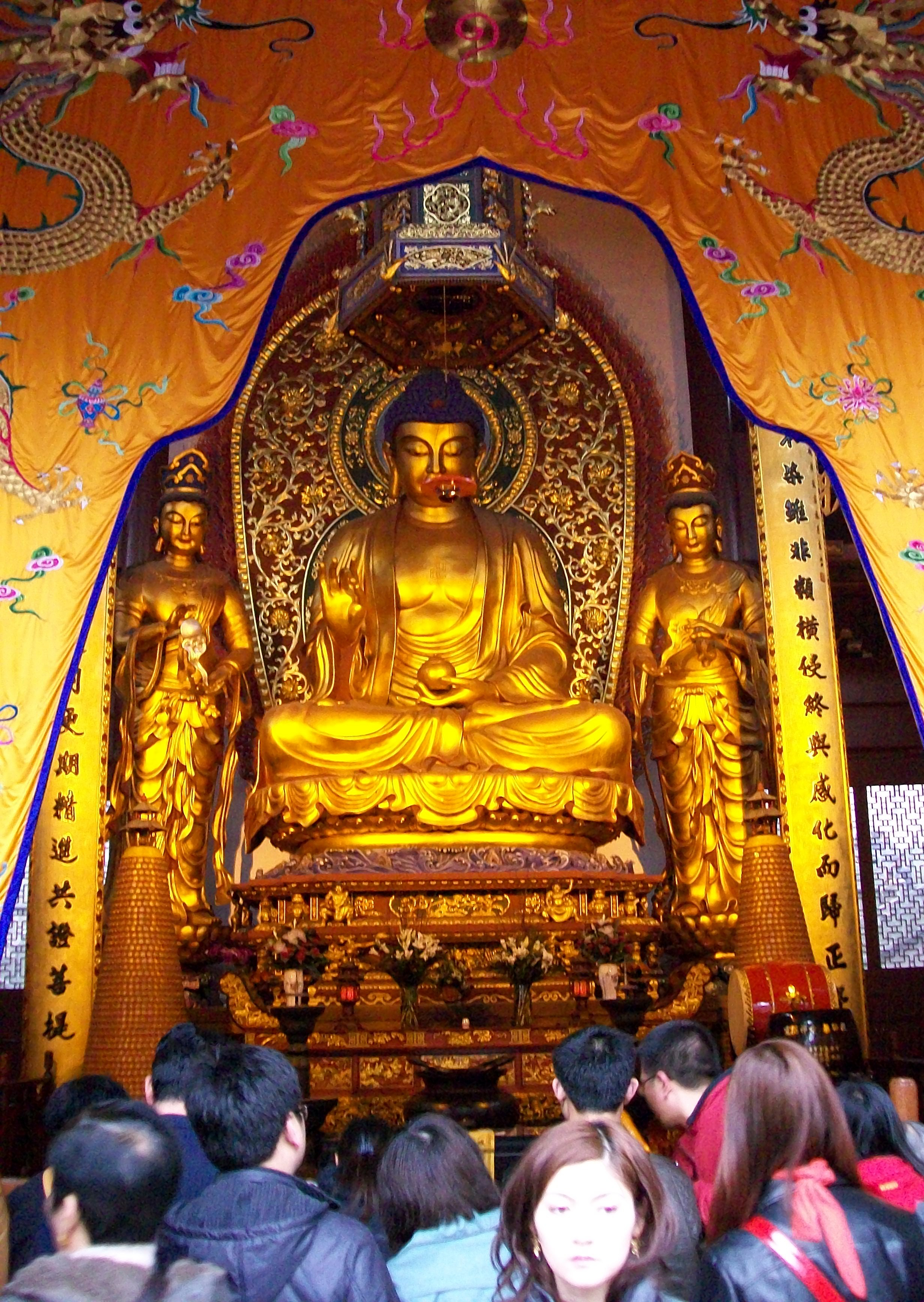
Statues of the Buddha Yaoshi with his attendant Bodhisattvas Sūryaprabha and Candraprabha flanking him at Lingyin Temple in Hangzhou, China. He is the main figure whom the Yaoshi Bao Chan is centered around.

The Yaoshi Bao Chan (Chinese: 藥師寶懺; lit. 'Jewelled Repentance of Yaoshi'), officially titled the Cibei Yaoshi Bao Chan (慈悲藥師寶懺, lit: "Jewelled Repentance of the Compassionate Yaoshi") and sometimes known as the Medicine Buddha Repentance, is a Chinese Buddhist repentance rite. It is based around the Buddha Bhaiṣajyaguru, who is commonly known in Chinese as Yaoshi (藥師, lit: "Medicine Teacher"). The ritual was first composed during the early Qing dynasty (1644–1912), and is traditionally ascribed to the Nanshan Vinaya master Jianyue Duti (見月讀體, 1601–1679). The ritual's liturgy received further edits and addendums in later periods, most notably by the Tiantai monk Shou Deng (受登, 1607–1675). In modern times, this rite remains a popular rite in the Chinese Buddhist ritual field, where it is typically performed to extinguish calamities, cure illnesses, prolong lifespans, resolve grievances as well as bring salvation to the deceased.

== History ==
=== Overview of repentance rites ===
Repentance rites originated from confession rituals, known as Uposatha, in Indian Buddhism, where monastics would confess offenses and recite the Pāṭimokkha on the Uposatha days (full and new–moon days). As early as the first century BCE before Buddhism was transmitted to China, several repentance scriptures in Sanskrit were already in circulation in India, with a key example being the Triskandhadharma Sūtra (三品悔過經), which was later translated to Chinese by the eminent monk Dharmarakṣa and constitutes a chapter in the Mahāratnakūṭa Sūtra. Two of the earliest repentance scriptures translated into Chinese approximately in the middle of the second century CE are the Foshuo asheshiwang jing (佛說阿闍世王經, lit: "The Buddha Speaks of King Ajātaśatru Sūtra"), which was translated by An Shigao, and the Foshuo shelifu huiguo jing (佛說舍利弗悔過經, lit: "The Buddha Speaks of Śāripūtra Repentance Sūtra"), which was translated by Lokakṣema. Consequently, over the next four centuries, a total of sixty–one repentance scriptures were translated into Chinese.

By the Northern and Southern Dynasties period (420–589), new repentance rituals also began to be composed by monks based on popular scriptures. One prominent example is the Fahua sanmei chanyi (法華三昧懺儀, lit: "Lotus Samādhi Repentance Ritual"), which was compiled by the eminent monk and founder of the Tiantai tradition, Zhiyi (智顗, 538–597). The Fahua sanmei chanyi (Japanese: Hokke zanmai sengi) is still practiced in modern times by contemporary Chinese Tiantai monastics as well as Japanese Tendai monastics. Another notable example of a repentance rite that was composed during this period is the Liang Huang Bao Chan (梁皇寶懺, lit: "Repentance Ritual of the Emperor of Liang"). This extensive ritual, which was originally composed by the eminent Chan Buddhist master Baozhi (寶志, 418–514, traditionally regarded as an emanation of Shiyimian Guanyin) on behalf of Emperor Wu of Liang, has remained highly popular in modern Chinese Buddhist practice and is frequently referred to as the "king of repentance rites" (懺法之王) among practitioners. It is typically performed on an annual or even more frequent basis in most Chinese Buddhist temples, sometimes as part of a larger event like the Shuilu Fahui ceremony. By the Sui dynasty (581–618), repentance rituals were so popular that they were also regularly performed by the imperial court. For instance, the Xu gaoseng zhuan (續高僧傳, lit: "Continued Biographies of Eminent Monks") by the eminent monk Daoxuan (道宣, 596–667), who was a Patriarch of the Nanshan Vinaya tradition, records that Emperor Wen of Sui performed repentance ceremonies whenever he hosted vegetarian feasts by personally holding the incense burner while his official Xiao Cong (萧琮, 558–607), who was previously the Emperor of the Liang dynasty, provided him with guidance on how to manage affairs of state.

As the popularity and number of repentance rites continued to grow, eminent Sui and Tang dynasty (618–907) Buddhist masters and patriarchs such as Zhiyi, Daoxuan and Huineng started to proposed several different schemes of classifying the different rites. In general, these schemes can generally be classified into three types of repentance rituals depending on the severity of the offenses and purposes:

- Communal repentance (作法懺悔): Solely for Buddhist monks and nuns who have violated any of their precepts, except the four parajika offenses which entail expulsion from the sangha. Usually held on the days of new and full moon or Uposatha, the precepts are recited according to the seven categories. At the end of each category, the Buddhist monks and nuns are expected to confess if they have violated any of the precepts; otherwise, they remain silent.
- Visionary or auspicious sign repentance (觀相懺悔): Can be practiced by both monastics and lay people, especially when lay people want to undergo ordination with the Bodhisattva precepts of the Brahmajāla Sūtra. For monastics, the Bodhisattva precepts are transmitted last as part of their ordination. This type of repentance is usually performed in order to receive the Bodhisattva precepts or for purification purposes if a monastic or lay person has violated any of their precepts, except the five grave offenses.
- Unborn or markless repentance (無生懺悔 or 無相懺悔): Cultivation of this form of repentance mostly entails giving rise to bodhicitta, having compassion for all sentient beings, and deeply examining the source of transgression to see that all dharms, including the nature of one's transgression or offense, is itself empty and has no one to cling to. According to both Zhiyi and Huineng, this form of repentance could eradicate innumerable eons of past major transgressions.

Repentance rituals continued to be highly popular in the succeeding Song (960–1279), Yuan (1271–1368), Ming (1368–1644) and Qing (1644–1912) dynasties, with numerous repentance rituals being composed by various eminent monks and being encoded into standardized monastic regulatory codes. For instance, the Song dynasty Tiantai patriarch Siming Zhili (四明知禮, 960–1028) composed an influential repentance ritual called the Dabei Chan (大悲懺, lit: "Great Compassion Repentance") based around the practice of the Nīlakaṇṭha Dhāraṇī, which remains one of the most popular repentance rites in contemporary Chinese Buddhism, being performed at least once a month or more in most Chinese Buddhist temples. Another example is the Dizang Bao Chan (地藏寶懺, "Jewelled Repentance of Dizang"), which was originally composed by the eminent Ming dynasty monk Ouyi Zhixu (蕅益智旭, 1599–1655), who was a Patriarch of both the Chinese Pure Land and Tiantai traditions. In contemporary Chinese Buddhist practice, various different repentance rites are typically practiced throughout the year, sometimes as independent rituals and other times as part of larger events such as the Shuilu Fahui ceremony.

=== Worship of Bhaiṣajyaguru (Yaoshi) ===
==== Names and epithets ====
In Chinese Buddhist practice, the Buddha Bhaiṣajyaguru is commonly referred to as simply Yaoshi Fo (藥師佛), meaning "Medicine Teacher Buddha", or Yaoshi Rulai (藥師如來), meaning "Medicine Teacher Tathāgata". In many liturgies and ritual contexts, Yaoshi's name is also frequently chanted as either Yaoshi Liuli Guang Rulai (藥師琉璃光如來), meaning "Yaoshi Rulai of Lapis Lazuli Light", or Xiaozai Yanshou Yaoshi Fo (消灾延壽藥師佛), meaning "Yaoshi Fo who averts calamities and extends lifespans".

==== Translation of sūtras ====
Full digitized copy of a Tang dynasty (618–907) edition of Xuanzang's translation of the Yaoshi jing, a particularly influential sūtra associated with Yaoshi, from the Mogao Caves at Dunhuang, China.

Full digitized copy of a Qing dynasty (1644–1912) edition of Xuanzang's translation of the Yaoshi jing, personally handwritten by the eminent Patriarch of the Nanshan Vinaya tradition, Venerable Hongyi (1880–1942).

Worship of Yaoshi in China begin during the Eastern Jin dynasty (266–420) with the translation of the Foshuo guanding bachu guozui shengsi dedu jing (佛說灌頂拔除過罪生死得度經, lit: "The Buddha Speaks of the Abhiṣeka that Eliminates Past Offenses and Causes One to Attain Liberation from Birth and Death Sūtra") by the Kuchean monk Po–Śrīmitra. More scriptures regarding Yaoshi were transmitted to China in the succeeding centuries, namely the Foshuo Yaoshi liuli guang jing (佛說藥師琉璃光經, lit: "The Buddha Speaks of Yaoshi of Lapis Lazuli Light Sūtra"), which was translated in 457 by the monk Huijian (慧簡) during the Liu–Song dynasty (420–479), and the Yaoshi Rulai benyuan gongde jing (藥師如來本願功德經 lit: "The Merits of Yaoshi Rulai's Root Vows Sūtra"), which was translated in 615 by the monk Dharmagupta during the Sui dynasty (581–618).

The succeeding Tang dynasty (618–907) saw a further flowering of Buddhism as more scriptures were translated from Sanskrit into Chinese. In particular, numerous esoteric and tantric scriptures were translated as part of this milieu, correlating with the rise in prominence of Zhenyan Buddhism during this period as various eminent tantric masters like Vajrabodhi and Amoghavajra were patronized by the Tang imperial court. Some examples of new scriptures that regarding Yaoshi that were translated during this time include:

- Yaoshi Liuli Guang Rulai xiaozai chunan niansong yigui (藥師琉璃光如來消災除難念誦儀軌, lit: "Ritual Manual for the Recitation to Avert Calamities and Remove DIfficulties of Yaoshi Rulai of Lapis Lazuli Light"), which is attributed to Yixing in the Taishō Tripiṭaka
- Yaoshi Rulai niansong yigui (藥師如來念誦儀軌, lit: "Ritual Manual for the Recitation of Yaoshi Rulai"), by Amoghavajra
- Yaoshi Rulai niansong fa (藥師如來念誦法, lit: "Method of the Recitation of Yaoshi Rulai"), by Vajrabodhi

Two other sūtras translated during this time that would become very influential in Chinese Buddhist practice are the Yaoshi Liuli Guang Rulai benyuan gongde jing (藥師琉璃光如來本願功德經, lit: "The Merits of Yaoshi Rulai of Lapis Lazuli Light's Root Vows Sūtra"), which was translated by the eminent monk and Patriarch of the Weishi tradition Xuanzang (玄奘, 602–664), and the Yaoshi Liuli Guang Qifo benyuan gongde jing (藥師琉璃光七佛本願功德經, lit: "The Merits of the Seven Yaoshi Buddhas of Lapis Lazuli Light's Root Vows Sūtra"), which was translated by the monk and travel writer Yijing (義淨, 635–713). Xuanzang's translation in particular would become particularly popular and is widely referred to in Chinese Buddhist practice as the Yaoshi jing (藥師經, lit: "Yaoshi Sūtra").

==== Practices of Yaoshi devotion ====
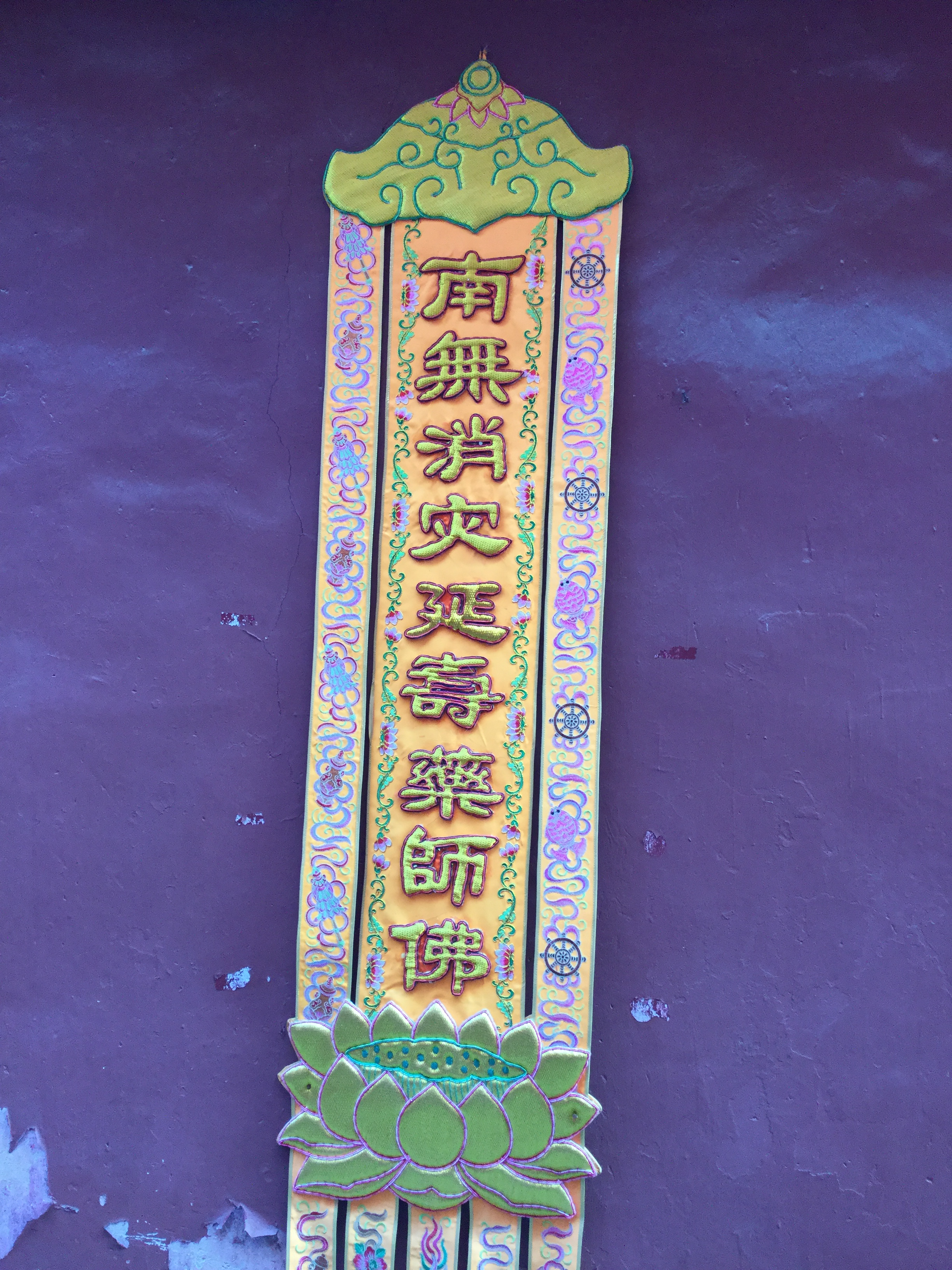
A banner which reads: "Namo Xiaozai Yanshou Yaoshi Fo" (南無消灾延壽藥師佛), meaning "I take refuge in Yaoshi Fo who averts calamities and extends lifespans". Xiaozai Yanshou is a very popular epithet of Yaoshi, and is frequently chanted during various rituals and ceremonies.

Many sūtras describe Yaoshi as having been a Bodhisattva who made twelve great vows about blessing sentient beings as well as relieving the physical and mental suffering caused by the ignorance in their hearts. As his name suggests, he is commonly associated with healing and medicine, and is frequently entreated to avert disasters and prolong one's lifespan. Upon achieving Buddhahood, Yaoshi became the Buddha of the Eastern Pure Land of Vaiḍūryanirbhāsa, which means "Pure Lapis Lazuli". There, he is attended to by two Bodhisattvas symbolizing the light of the sun and the light of the moon respectively: Sūryaprabha (日光菩薩) and Candraprabha (月光菩薩). Iconographic depictions of Yaoshi also frequently depict him together with the Twelve Heavenly Generals, a group of yakshas generals who pledged to protect devotees who practiced Yaoshi's Dharma Door, as well as Eight Great Bodhisattvas mentioned in the Yaoshi jing: Guanyin, Maitreya, Mañjuśrī, Mahāsthāmaprāpta, Ratnacandana, Akṣayamati, Bhaiṣajyarāja and Bhaiṣajyasamudgata. Chinese Buddhist traditions ascribes the 30th day of the ninth lunar month according to the Chinese calendar as Yaoshi's "Birthday", and during this day, monastics and lay followers typically perform rituals and other practices devoted to Yaoshi. In Chinese Buddhist temples, Yaoshi is frequently enshrined as either one out of three Buddha statues in the Daxiongbao Hall (the other two being of Amitābha and Śākyamuni) or in a dedicated hall devoted to him called the Yaoshi Hall.

Full digitized copy of a Republican era edition of the Yaoshi Fo shengdan zhu yi (藥師佛聖誕祝儀, lit: "Ritual for the Birthday of Yaoshi Fo") published in 1934 by Shanghai Buddhist Books, which is a liturgical manual for rites to be performed during Yaoshi's Birthday.

A common practice of Yaoshi devotion is the creation of images and statues of Yaoshi. The earliest known example is an image of Yaoshi carved in a small niche on the upper part of the western wall of Cave 11 at the Yungang Grottoes, which dates back to the Northern Wei Dynasty (386–535). Numerous other extant statues of Yaoshi that were made during the Northern Wei and Northern Qi (550–577) dynasties can be found in various sites throughout China, in some cases even including inscriptions recording the name of the people who made them. By the Tang dynasty, Yaoshi images became more common and their uses became more widespread. Multiple historical records describe not only government officials and monks and nuns, but also ordinary citizens commissioning and creating Yaoshi statues for a variety of purposes, including wishing for blessings for pregnancies as well as dedication towards deceased loved ones. This indicated that belief and faith in Yaoshi was already widespread throughout all social strata of Chinese society by the Tang dynasty. The practice of creating Yaoshi statues remained popular after the Tang dynasty into contemporary times, with numerous extant statues in sites like the Dazu Rock Carvings dating to subsequent dynasties. Aside from statues, paintings and embroidered images of Yaoshi were also common as a way of memorializing the deceased and praying for blessings. For example, when the Tang Emperor Dezong's daughter, Princess Tang'an, passed away, the Emperor ordered the national artisans to embroider Yaoshi's image "using exquisite colors to radiate brilliance, in order to bring good fortune and to guide the deceased." In another example, when the Tang poet and official Lü Wen (呂溫, 772–811) was sent to Tibet as an envoy in 804, his wife's embroidered an image of Yaoshi to seek Yaoshi's protection for him. After the Tang dynasty, Yaoshi continued to remain a popular subject in Buddhist paintings even until the Qing dynasty (1644–1912). For instance, the famous Song dynasty poet Su Shi (蘇軾,1037-1101), also widely known as Su Dongpo (蘇東坡), who commissioned a painting of Yaoshi after his grandchildren were cured of a prolonged illness. He also wrote a eulogy of praise in commemoration of Yaoshi and the event:

佛弟子蘇龠，與其妹德孫，病久不愈。其父過，母範氏，供養祈禱藥師琉璃光佛，遂獲痊損。其大父軾，特為造畫尊像，敬拜稽首，為之贊曰：

我佛出現時，眾生無病惱。
世界悉琉璃，大地皆藥草。
我今眾稚孺，仰佛如翁媼。
面頤既圓平，風末亦除掃。
弟子龠與德，前世衲衣老。
敬造世尊像，壽命仗佛保。

Translation:

The Buddhist disciple, Su Yue, and his sister, Su De, had been suffering from a prolonged illness without recovery. Their father, Guo, and mother, Fan, offered prayers and offerings to Yaoshi Buddha of Lapis Lazuli Light, following which they were cured. Their grandfather, Shi, specially commissioned a painting of the Buddha's image, and, respectfully bowed in reverence, composed the following eulogy:

When my Buddha appears, sentient beings bear no illnesses or suffering.
Lapis lazuli filling the world, medicinal herbs covering the great earth.
Now our young children revere the Buddhas like they do their elders.
Their cheeks and chin have become smooth and even, and all evil winds have been swept away.
Your disciples Yue and De, were old kasaya-wearing monks in their previous life.
We respectfully create images of the World Honoured One, and rely on the Buddha to protect our lifespans.

Another prominent example is the famous Qing dynasty artist Ding Guanpeng (丁觀鵬,1708–1771), who painted "The Assembly of Yaoshi Buddha of Lapis Lazuli Light" (藥師琉璃光佛會) for the Qing Qianlong Emperor, which depicted Yaoshi together with his retinue: Sūryaprabha, Candraprabha, the Eight Great Bodhisattvas, the Twelve Heavenly Generals, Mahākāśyapa, Ānanda and over forty other deities.

Full digitized copy of a modern edition of the Yaoshi Rulai famen jiangshu lu (藥師如來法門講述錄, lit: "Record of the Account of Yaoshi Rulai's Dharma Door" by the eminent Patriarch of the Nanshan Vinaya tradition, Venerable Hongyi (1880–1942), which provides a description of Yaoshi and practices centered around him in Chinese Buddhism.

Another major component of the worship of Yaoshi is the ceremonial lighting of lamps. This practice derives from the Yaoshi jing itself, and typically involves the temple setting up an altar consisting of forty-nine lamps, which are supposed to remain continuously lit for the entirety of the ritual period. Traditionally, oil lamps were used, but some temples may also use electrical lighting in contemporary times. Due to Yaoshi's rites being frequently performed to pray for longevity, these lamps have become commonly known in Chinese as changming deng (長命燈, lit: "Long life lamps"). Five-coloured life-extending banners known as fan (幡) are also typically set up together with the lamps. After the lamps are lit and banners are set up, the Yaoshi jing is typically recited for the entirety of the ritual period. Historical records show that this ritual was already in practice during the early Tang dynasty. For instance, a document that was unearthed from a tomb in Turpan titled Tang xianheng san nian xinfu wei agong lu zai sheng gongde shu (唐咸亨三年新婦為阿公錄在生功德疏, lit: "Memorial by a newlywed bride regarding her father-in-law's merits during his lifetime, recorded during the Xianheng era of the Tang dynasty"), dating to 672, described the eponymous bride's father-in-law being commemorated by a ritual at a temple where forty–nine lamps were lit at dusk, a yellow banner was hung and monks were invited to perform repentance rites according to the prescriptions of a sūtra related to Yaoshi. In contemporary times, this ritual is still practiced widely by Chinese Buddhist temples, especially during the eighth lunar month, which is traditionally devoted to the rites of Yaoshi according to the Chinese Buddhist liturgical calendar.

Another common practice of Yaoshi devotion is the chanting or recitation of his mantras. One popular mantra associated with him in the Chinese Buddhist tradition is the Yaoshi Guanding Zhenyan (藥師灌頂真言, lit: "Yaoshi Abhiṣeka Dhāraṇī"), also known as the Bhaiṣajyaguru Vaiḍūrya Prabhasa Tathāgatā Abhisecani Dhāraṇī in Sanskrit. This mantra is recorded in the Yaoshi Liuli Guang Qifo benyuan gongde jing that was translated by Yijing and is considered one of the Ten Small Mantras, which is a grouping of mantras that are typically recited during the morning liturgical service in most Chinese Buddhist temples.

=== Composition and practice of the Yaoshi Bao Chan ===
Modern edition of the ritual manual for the Yaoshi Bao Chan.

By the late Ming dynasty (1368–1644), the influential monk and monastic reformer, Yunqi Zhuhong (雲棲袾宏, 1535–1615), who was the Eighth Patriarch of the Chinese Pure Land tradition, extensively practiced repentance rituals, which greatly influenced the composition of many other new repentance rituals, some of which were devoted to Yaoshi. The authorship of the Yaoshi Bao Chan is traditionally attributed to the eminent early Qing dynasty (1644–1912) monk Jianyue Duti (見月讀體), who was a Vinaya specialist from Yunnan. In his youth, he was inspired to join the Buddhist monkhood after reading the Avataṃsaka Sūtra and eventually received ordination under the Vinaya master Sanmei Jiguang (三昧寂光), an eminent monk who was recognized as a national preceptor by both the Ming and Qing imperial courts and who served as the abbot of Longchang Temple on Mount Baohua, a prestigious monastic center that was famed for their Vinaya studies during the Qing dynasty. During the late Ming to early Qing dynasty period, monastic discipline was seen as being on a decline. In response, Duti promoted Vinaya studies, rectified many monastery malpractices, and, due to his strict self-discipline, was a respected Vinaya master who was seen as a reformer and revitalizer of monastic ethics and precepts. Duti would eventually succeed Jiguang as the abbot of Longchang Temple. Aside from his abbotship and promotion of the Vinaya, he was also notable for his works on repentance rituals, with a prominent example being his re-edited version of Siming Zhili's liturgical manual for the Dabei Chan. While some Chinese Buddhist traditions hold Duti as the original composer of the Yaoshi Bao Chan's ritual manual, there is no extant copy of his version of the manual.

After the ritual's composition, it was practiced by the Chan Buddhist master Ren'an Yi (仁庵義禪師), who later introduced it to the Tiantai monk Shou Deng (受登, 1607–1675). At this time, the ritual's liturgy was titled the Yaoshi sanmei xingfa (藥師三昧行法, lit: "The Method of Practicing Yaoshi Samādhi"). Shou Deng revised and edited the ritual's liturgy in 1664, defining it in terms of four aspects: the name (explaining the origin of Yaoshi Samādhi), encouragement of practice (admonishing the practice of Yaoshi Samādhi), method (revealing the method of offering to Yaoshi), and clarification (affirming the liturgical manual as an essential method for achieving blessings and eliminating calamities). Shou Deng's version of the ritual manual was widely printed and disseminated under the commission of a layman named Mao Shengye (懋聖葉), becoming popular in the Jiangnan region. Shou Deng's liturgy would receive several more edits in later periods, eventually becoming standardized as a three-volume ritual manual titled the Cibei Yaoshi bao chan (慈悲藥師寶懺, lit: "Jewelled Repentance of the Compassionate Yaoshi"). This finalized version is still widely used in most modern contemporary performances of the ritual throughout China, Taiwan, Singapore, Malaysia and other overseas Chinese communities.

== Ritual Outline ==
The entire ritual programme of the Yaoshi Bao Chan is divided into three volumes. The twelve great vows of Yaoshi and the meaning of the Yaoshi jing are respectively incorporated into the ritual's liturgical text, so that the reciters can repent, worship the Triple Gem, recite mantras and pay homage to the Buddhas and Bodhisattvas throughout the liturgy. The liturgy is typically performed through a style of Chinese Buddhist chanting called fanbai.

=== Volume One ===
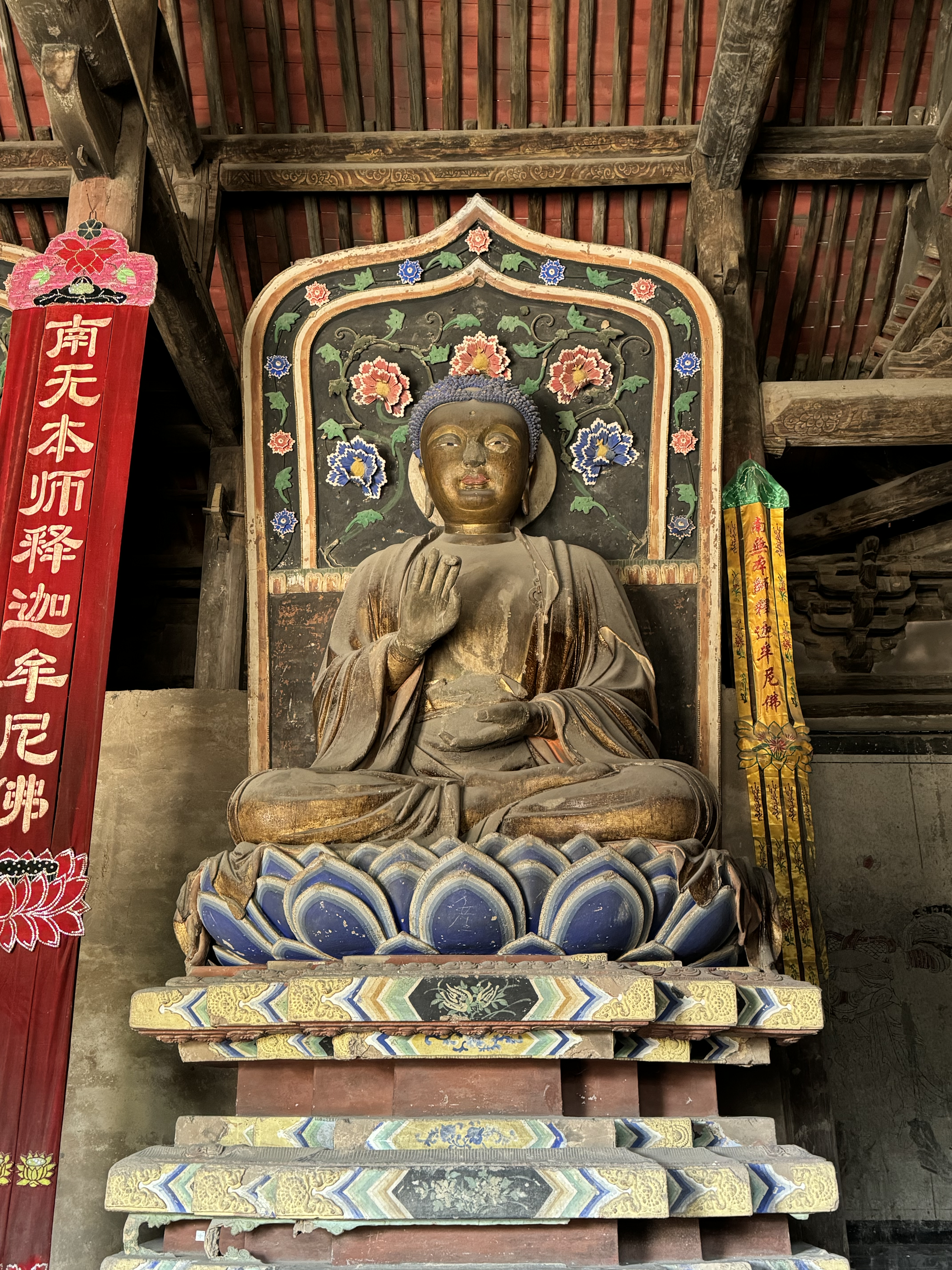
Ming dynasty (1368 - 1644) statue of Yaoshi Fo at Chongfu Temple^{[zh]} in Shanxi, China.

This section begins with a recitation of a hymn by participants called the Yangzhi jingshui zan (楊枝淨水讚, lit: "Praise of the Willow Branch and Pure Water"):

楊枝淨水，
遍灑三千。
性空八德利人天，
福壽廣增延。
滅罪消愆，
火焰化紅蓮。

Translation:

Willow branch and pure water,
Sprinkling across the three thousand realms.
Benefiting humans and devas with its nature of Emptiness and Eight Virtues,
Broadly bestowing fortune and extending longevity.
Extinguishing sins and absolving transgression,
A blazing fire blooms into a crimson lotus.

The assembly then chants "Namo Qingliangdi Pusa Mohesa" (南無清涼地菩薩摩訶薩), meaning "I take refuge in the Bodhisattva Mahāsattvas of the Pure and Cool Ground", up to three times. Next, the assembly chants "Namo Sheng Guanzizai Pusa" (南無聖觀自在菩薩), meaning "I take refuge in the Noble Guanzizai Bodhisattva", up to three times as well. This is followed by the chanting of numerous mantras, namely the Nīlakaṇṭha Dhāraṇī, all the Ten Small Mantras as well as three more repetitions of the Aparimitāyur-jñāna-suviniścita-tejo-rājāya Dhāraṇī. The Heart Sūtra is then chanted, followed by three repetitions of "Mohe bore boluomiduo" (摩訶般若波羅蜜多), meaning "Mahāprajñāpāramitā".

Following the initial purifications, the assembly offers incense with another hymn called the xiangzan (香讚, lit: “Incense Praise”) that describes the incense smoke pervading the Dharma Realm and reaching the assembly of Yaoshi. The assembly then chants three times that they take refuge in the Bodhisattva Mahāsattvas of the incense cloud canopy (香雲蓋菩薩摩訶薩). Verses providing a visionary description of the Bodhisattva Samantabhadra, commonly known in Chinese as Puxian (普賢), is then chanted. This section describes Puxian appearing on a white elephant mount, emitting multiple kinds of lights which manifests countless Buddhas and Bodhisattvas who rain down flowers upon the assembly while jade maidens play music and sing songs praising the Mahāyāna, surrounded by transformation Buddhas and Bodhisattvas, and praised by heavenly maidens.

The participants then sincerely make one full prostration to each of the constantly abiding Triple Gem of the ten directions before kneeling down and holding up an offering plate filled with flowers, incense and rice to make the offering. During this time, the participants chant verses expressing their wish that the fragrant flowers will decorate all immeasurable sacred Buddha Lands in the ten directions, and that they will accomplish the Bodhisattva path to the complete level of a Tathāgata. The weina delivers a short prose section describing the participants' bodies pervading unobstructed throughout the ten directions and making offerings before the Triple Gem in all ten directions, as well as praying that the fragrance of the offerings reaches all sentient beings in the Dharma Realm and that, having received the fragrance, they give rise to bodhicitta.

Next, the assembly chants three times that they take refuge in Ratnacandana Bodhisattva (南無寶曇華菩薩摩訶薩) before requesting either Yaoshi or Śākyamuni Buddha to serve as the witness of the repentance ritual:

妄念成生滅，真如不變遷
總持難思議，無住對空宣

仰白十方三寶。藥師如來。剎海天龍。一切聖眾。願賜慈悲。俯垂
證鑒。有疏披宣。伏希諦聽。

Translation:

Delusional thoughts arise and cease, true reality remains unchanged.
The dharanis' meanings are inconceivable. Unabiding, I proclaim to emptiness.

I humbly beseech the Three Jewels of the ten directions, Yaoshi Rulai, the heavenly dragons of the Buddha-fields and the oceans, and all the holy beings. May you grant me your compassion and be my witnesses. I have submitted this petition, and reverently request your attentive listening.

This is followed by the recitation of a prose section and another gāthās praising the Buddhas and imploring their aid in extinguishing sin, purifying one's mind and fulfilling one's vows. The assembly then takes refuge in a list of Buddhas and Bodhisattvas, namely:

- The Buddhas of the three periods (past, present, future)
- The Seven Buddhas of Antiquity, consisting of Vipassī (毗婆尸佛), Sikhī (尸棄佛), Viśvabhū (毗舍浮佛), Krakucchanda (拘留孫佛), Kanakamuni (拘那含牟尼佛), Kāśyapa (迦葉佛)
- Śākyamuni (本師釋迦牟尼佛)
- Maitreya (當來彌勒尊佛)
- Yaoshi (藥師琉璃光如來)

After this, the assembly recites the kaijing ji (開經偈, lit: "Gāthā on opening the sutra"), which is a standard verse that is typically chanted at the start of the recitation of sutras. The verses proclaim:

無上甚深微妙法，百千萬劫難遭遇
我今見聞得受持，願解如來懺法義

Translation:

The unsurpassed, profound and wondrous Dharma is difficult to encounter in hundreds, thousands and tens of thousands of kalpas.
Now, I see, hear and uphold it, vowing to understand the meaning of the repentance dharma of the Tathāgatās.

The assembly then recites a doctrinal prose section explaining why the Yaoshi Bao Chan is necessary. It states that all Buddhas, out of compassion, teach this Yaoshi Bao Chan because beings are heavily defiled, obscured by ignorance, unaware of karma and retribution, and fail to practice repentance. Unchecked greed, anger, and delusion lead to killing, stealing, sexual misconduct, and “immeasurable” offenses, which in turn cause premature death, loss of status, poverty, bereavement, the nine untimely deaths (Getting sick without medical treatment, being executed by the law, being deprived of one's vital energy by non-human beings due to a lifestyle of unrestrained indulgences, being burned by fire, drowning, being devoured by ferocious beasts, falling off a cliff, being poisoned or cursed, or dying from hunger and thirst), and rebirth in the three evil destinies (of hell-beings, hungry ghosts and animals). The liturgy then cites the Yaoshi jing, noting that it was out of compassion for such suffering sentient beings that Yaoshi instructed those who read and recited his sutra to make of seven images of himself, each with seven lamps, their flames “as large as cart-wheels,” maintained unbroken for forty-nine days. The liturgy states that such practices are suitable for kṣatriyas and for wealthy householders whose treasuries overflow with resources. The liturgy further states that, for “those of meagre means” who rejoice in the Dharma but who cannot afford to adorn their practice according to the full prescription, the method of repentance of the Yaoshi Bao Chan was translated from the Yaoshi jing so that all may benefit. The liturgy recommends that practitioners should observe purity, fast, and bathe; practice either in a monastery or at home; invite monastic companions or gather virtuous friends; sweep, cleanse, and purify the place; offer incense, flowers, lamps, and candles according to their ability; follow the prescribed verses and chants; and bow with utmost sincerity and devotion. According to the prose, if practitioners were to follow these instructions, then there will be nothing sought that will not receive a response, and no vow made that will not be fulfilled. The assembly then takes refuge in a particular list of Buddhas, Bodhisattvas and other holy Buddhist figures. This list is invoked repeatedly at various points later in the ritual, and makes its first appearance here. The list consists of:

Sanskrit name and meaning	Chinese name
Vairocana	Piluzhena Fo (毗盧遮那佛)
Our Original Teacher, Śākyamuni	Benshi Shijiamouni Fo (本師釋迦牟尼佛)
Bhaiṣajya-guru-vaiḍūrya-prabha-rāja	Yaoshi Liuli Guang Rulai (藥師琉璃光如來)
Amitāyus	Wuliangshou Fo (無量壽佛)
All Buddhas of the past throughout all ten directions of the Dharma Realm	Jin Shifang Pian Fajie Guoqu Yiqie Zhufo (盡十方遍法界過去一切諸佛)
All Buddhas of the present throughout all ten directions of the Dharma Realm	Jin Shifang Pian Fajie Xianzai Yiqie Zhufo (盡十方遍法界現在一切諸佛)
All Buddhas of the future throughout all ten directions of the Dharma Realm	Jin Shifang Pian Fajie Weilai Yiqie Zhufo (盡十方遍法界未來一切諸佛)
The Merits of Yaoshi Tathāgata of Lapis Lazuli Light's Root Vows Sūtra	Yaoshi Liuli Guang Rulai Benyuan Gongde Jing (藥師琉璃光如來本願功德經)
Sūryaprabha	Riguang Pianzhao Pusa (日光遍照菩薩)
Candraprabha	Yueguang Pianzhao Pusa (月光遍照菩薩)
Mañjuśrī	Wenshushili Pusa (文殊師利菩薩)
Avalokiteśvara (Guanyin)	Guanshiyin Pusa (觀世音菩薩)
Mahāsthāmaprāpta	Dedashi Pusa (得大勢菩薩)
Akṣayamati	Wujinyi Pusa (無盡意菩薩)
Ratnacandana	Baotanhua Pusa (寶曇華菩薩)
Bhaiṣajyarāja	Yaowang Pusa (藥王菩薩)
Bhaiṣajyasamudgata	Yaoshang Pusa (藥上菩薩)
Maitreya	Mi Le Pusa (彌勒菩薩)
Extinguishes Calamities and Obstructions Bodhisattva	Xiaozaizhang Pusa (消灾障菩薩)
Extend Wealth and Longevity Bodhisattva	Zengfushou Pusa (增福壽菩薩)
The Thirty-Six Thousand Bodhisattvas who abide beneath the trees which produce music in the breeze	Leyinshu Xia Sanwan Liuqian Pusa (樂音樹下三萬六千菩薩)
Ānanda and the eight thousand bhikṣu and the various holy monks	Anan Zunzhe Baqian Biqiu Zhu Dasheng Seng (阿難尊者八千比丘諸大聖僧)
Salvation and Liberation Bodhisattva	Jiutuo Pusa (救脫菩薩)

After taking refuge in the list of Buddhist divinities, the assembly next recites a section listing the wide range of motivations sentients for which sentient beings should undertake and practice Yaoshi's dharma. It states that any sentient beings who wish to bring welfare and happiness to themselves and others, remove all karmic obstructions, and establish superior merit may perform this practice. These include those who wish to fulfil the great vows of the Buddhas, to uphold all Buddha-names and the treasury of true Dharma, or to attain anuttara-samyak-sambodhi together with the Buddha's thirty-two marks and eighty minor signs. Others may seek immeasurable wisdom and skilful means in order to establish beings in the Mahāyāna; to practice brahmacarya, keep unbroken precepts, and perfect the three sets of pure precepts; or to obtain complete sense faculties, freedom from illness, and abundant household wealth. Some may wish to escape Māra’s nets and the snares of heterodox views; women may aspire to be reborn male; parents may wish to obtain sons or daughters; others may desire long life, release from legal punishment and sorrow, fine food, Dharma nourishment, splendid garments, and precious adornments. Practitioners may also aspire to perfect generosity without stinginess, to acquire right view, diligence, well-regulated intentions, learning, sharp faculties, understanding of profound teachings, constant access to good spiritual friends, and the ability to maintain all disciplinary rules. Some may pray for rebirth in Amituofo (Amitābha)’s Western Pure Land of Sukhavati to hear the true Dharma; others wish to restore purity after breaking precepts or to extend an exhausted lifespan; still others may seek the pacification of calamities afflicting entire realms and populations. All such people, the liturgy says, should purify themselves, adorn the rite according to Dharma, and single-mindedly take refuge in Yaoshi and cultivate samādhi. This is because Yaoshi, while practicing the Bodhisattva path, made twelve sublime vows whose merit enables those who hear his name to have their karmic obstacles removed and their wishes fulfilled. Therefore, practitioners are urged to trust, understand, practice as taught, and offer even body, life, and possessions without stinginess, with the assurance that the intended results will be achieved.

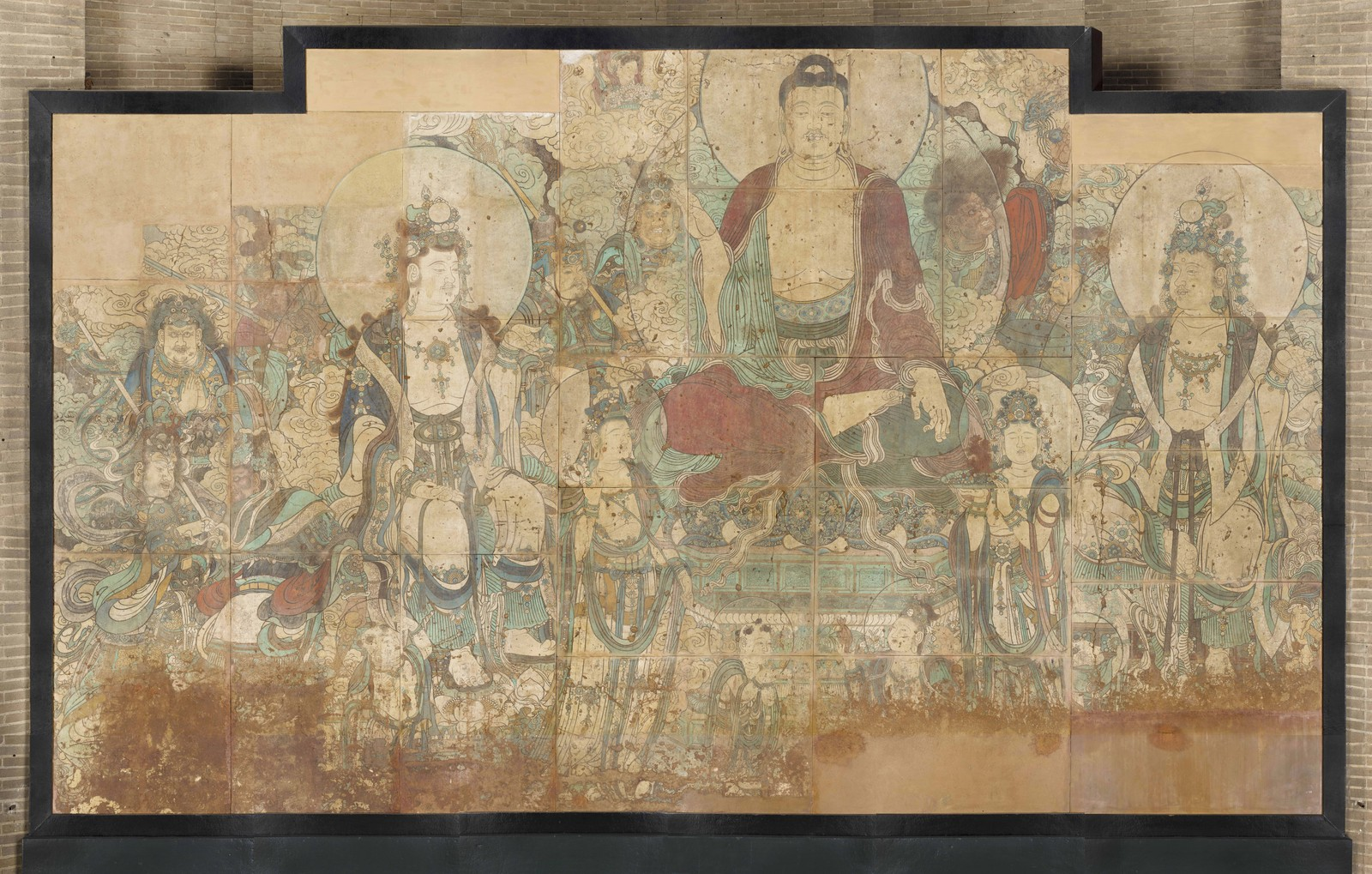
Ming dynasty (1368–1644) mural of Yaoshi with Bodhisattvas and heavenly kings. Currently held at the Royal Ontario Museum.

The assembly then reaffirms refuge in the previous list of Buddhist divinities again. After this, the practitioners earnestly take refuge and invite all Buddhas and Bodhisattvas to descend to the ritual space, together with the celestial beings of the devas, nāgas, the Eight Legions, and the yakṣa generals, asking them to arouse compassion and bear witness to the rite. The participants declare that they undertake the repentance not merely for themselves but on behalf of all beings in the ten directions and all six realms, aspiring to cultivate unsurpassed bodhi, remove all karmic obstacles, and enter together into the great ocean of the Tathāgata's vows. They vow to manifest bodies universally, to make offerings to all Buddhas and the Triple Gem in a single instant, and to liberate all beings of the six realms in a single thought, establishing them in the wisdom of equality. Thus, with single-minded diligence, they practice according to the teachings and beseech the Buddhas and Bodhisattvas, especially through the power of Yaoshi's original vows, to accept their repentance, remove their obscurations, and perfect their conduct and aspirations. The liturgy praises Yaoshi as an “Omniscient, Perfectly Enlightened One,” whose radiance surpasses sun and moon, whose brilliance awakens even beings in dark realms, and whose compassionate vows ensure that all who seek him have their wishes fulfilled and their illnesses dispelled. Even if one were to spend an entire aeon proclaiming the breadth of his vows and skilful means, the liturgy says, they could not be exhausted. Therefore, the practitioners once again wholeheartedly take refuge and bow in reverence.

After this, the assembly recites the Yaoshi Guanding Zhenyan, a popular mantra which is associated with Yaoshi. Following this, they chant a short hymn of praise to Yaoshi:

藥師如來。世界琉璃。
慈悲喜捨悉隨宜。懺法度羣迷。
稽首歸依。所願滿求祈。

Translation:

Yaoshi Rulai, a world of lapis lazuli.
According compassion, joy, and equanimity to all, liberating all beings from delusion through his method of repentance.
We bow in reverence and take refuge. May all our wishes be fulfilled.

The assembly then chants the name of Yaoshi several times before ending with "Namo Xiaozai Yanshou Yaoshi Fo" (南無消灾延壽藥師佛), meaning "I take refuge in Yaoshi Buddha who averts calamities and extends lifespans". The term "Xiaozai Yanshou" is a particularly popular epithet of Yaoshi and is frequently used to venerate and pay respects to him in Chinese Buddhist practice. Next, the assembly chants another short gāthā before ending volume one with more recitations of "Namo Xiaozai Yanshou Yaoshi Fo" while circumambulating the altar and dedicating the accumulated merits:

稽首東方滿月界，微妙正覺藥師尊。
三祇果滿不思議，十號名稱無等倫。
二六願門因地發，百千相好果中圓。
慈悲海闊測難量，功德山高讚莫盡。

Translation:

I bow to the Subtle and Perfectly Enlightened Honoured One, Yaoshi, from the Eastern Realm of the Full Moon.
His three asaṃkhyeya of attainments are inconceivable, his ten epithets are unparalleled.
His twelve vows arose from the causal ground, his hundreds and thousands of auspicious marks are perfected in the fruition.
His compassion is as vast as the ocean, immeasurable; his merits are as high as the mountain and beyond praise.

=== Volume Two ===
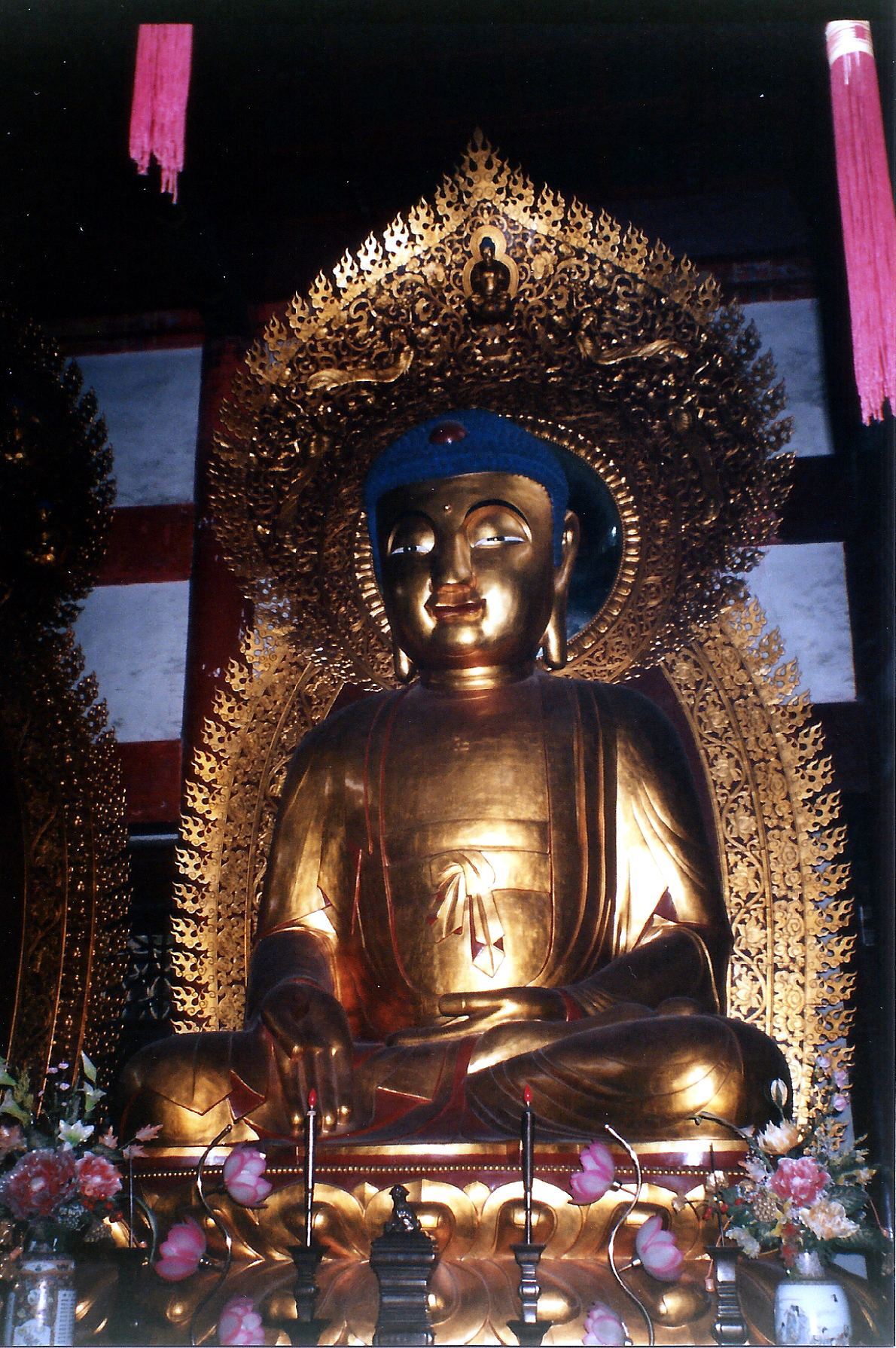
Ming dynasty (1368 - 1644) statue of Yaoshi Fo at Liurong Temple in Guangzhou, China. Cast in 1663.

Volume two opens with an invocatory verse that hails Yaoshi as the compassionate lord who responds to the cries of beings throughout the cosmos:

三千界內慈悲主，百億洲中大法王。
願開蓮目鑒凡情，眾生有求皆感應。

Translation:

The Compassionate Lord of the Three Thousand Realm, the Great Dharma King of a hundred billion continents.
We wish that you open your lotus eyes to behold our mundane passions, and respond to all the requests of sentient beings.

The liturgy then states that all Buddhas, out of pity for sentient beings, have proclaimed the Yaoshi Bao Chan. The assembly “now takes refuge in all Buddhas” and chants their refuge in the same extended list of Buddhas, Bodhisattvas, and holy figures introduced in volume one.

Having bowed to the Buddhas, the assembly proceeds to a formal repentance. Each member of the assembly then chants that they, along with all others in the assembly, undertake this practice universally for the “four kinds of kindness” (to parents, sentient beings, sovereign, and Triple Gem), for the three realms of existence (Kama-loka, Rupa-loka and Arupa-loka), and for all beings throughout the Dharma Realm. They vow to cut off the three obstacles (arising from afflictions, karma and retribution) and devote themselves to repentance. The prose describes how from beginningless time, because of attachment and mistaken views, sentient beings inwardly cling to self and others, externally follow bad friends, and fail to rejoice in even the slightest good done by others. Instead, through the three karmas of body, speech, and mind, they “broadly commit various evils”: even if their deeds are not broad, their evil intentions pervade. Day and night, these offenses continue without interruption. They conceal their faults, do not wish others to know, do not fear the evil destinies, lack shame and remorse, and even deny the law of cause and effect. Such karmic obstructions, the liturgy says, have not yet been repented. Now, before the Buddhas of the ten directions and Yaoshi, the practitioners arouse deep faith in karma and retribution, profound shame and great fear. They “expose and repent,” resolve to cut off the mind of continued wrongdoing, arouse bodhicitta, abandon evil, cultivate good, and diligently restrain the three karmas so as to reverse their heavy past transgressions. They express joy and rejoice in even the slightest good performed by both ordinary beings and sages, and recollect that Yaoshi Buddha, by his great vow-power, can rescue them from the “ocean of two deaths” and set them firmly upon the “shore of the three virtues” (wisdom, kindness and the elimination of afflictions). They beseech Yaoshi's compassion to accept and protect them, and take refuge and bow to him with sincere minds. The assembly then chants their refuge in the same extended list of Buddhist divinities.

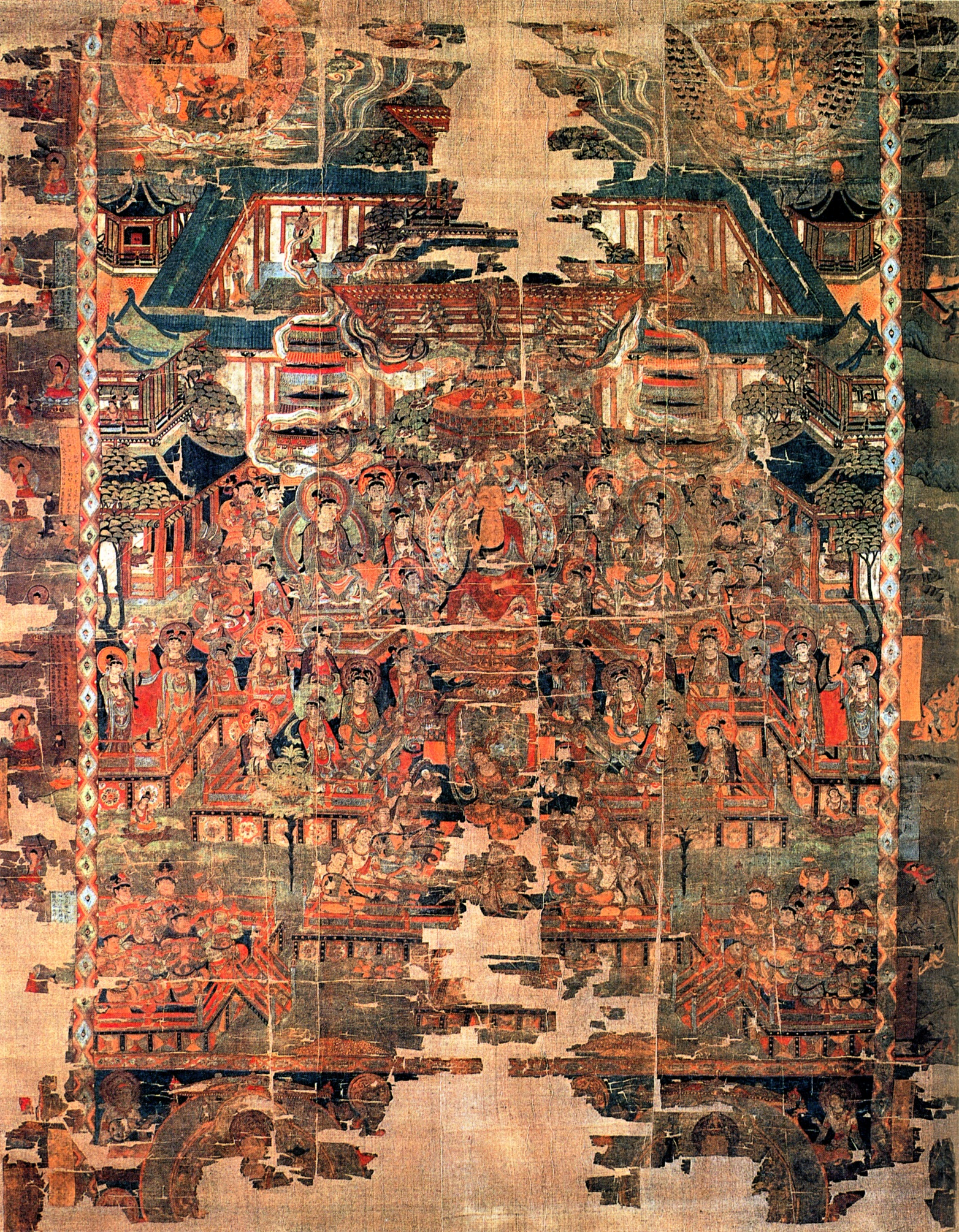
Tang dynasty (618–907) image of the Pure Land of Yaoshi, from the Mogao Caves near Dunhuang in Gansu, China. Yaoshi is seated in the center of the image, while Bodhisattvas are dancing and playing music in front of him. Currently located at the British Museum Department of Asia.

A second major repentance section then follows, this time framed explicitly in terms of “diseases” as a metaphor for karmic afflictions. The assembly confesses that from beginningless time up to the present, they have been afflicted by many types of “diseases”: the disease of greed, anger, and jealousy; the disease of arrogance and pride; the disease of not recognizing good and evil; the disease of not believing in sins and blessings; the disease of filial impiety and the five heinous crimes; the disease of reviling and disgracing the Triple Gem; the disease of failing to observe vegetarian practices; the disease of breaking śīla; the disease of praising oneself and disparaging others; the disease of insatiable craving; the disease of being infatuated with sights and sounds; the disease of clinging to fragrance and touch; the disease of wrong faith and inverted views; the disease of indulgence in licentiousness and alcohol; the disease of heedlessness and lack of restraint; the disease of “encountering a physician and yet given non-medicine,” as well as the disease of all manners of external calamities, insults, grief, mental anguish and bodily suffering. At this point, the assembly chants a section of the liturgy that quotes directly from a passage that is in most contemporary publications of the Yaoshi jing, recalling that, in order to eliminate these illnesses and fulfill their wishes, Yaoshi entered a samādhi called “Eliminating All the Sufferings and Distress of Sentient Beings” (除滅一切眾生苦惱). Having entered this concentration, he emitted a great light from his uṣṇīṣa, and within that radiance he proclaimed the Yaoshi Guanding Zhenyan. The assembly recites the mantra again at this point. Then, the liturgy describes the earth trembling and great light shining forth; all sentient beings have their sicknesses dispelled and obtain peace and happiness. The liturgy concludes that the power of repentance is an efficacious medicine which cures the myriad diseases of the mind and provides a marvelous prescription for transcending birth and death.

The assembly then chants an exposition on Yaoshi as the “Great King of Physicians,” who administers medicine according to the illnesses of sentient beings. It explains that the four immeasurables of loving-kindness, compassion, joy, and equanimity are medicines; patience and gentleness are medicines; right faith in the Triple Gem is a medicine; diligent cultivation of merit and wisdom is a medicine; the six pāramitās are medicines; the amṛta of the Dharma is a medicine; desiring and seeking the Dharma is a medicine; Cultivating the truth and conserving energy is a medicine; returning to one's fundamental origin is a medicine; the ability to correct one own's faults is a medicine; skillful means are medicines; remaining calm and keeping an unassuming attitude in the face of adversity is a medicine; purifying the mind and cutting off desires are medicines. Practitioners are urged to “pound, sift, and compound” these medicines, and “take them at the proper times”. From the standpoint of ultimate truth, however, the liturgy then states that sentient beings’ various illnesses are all the same “illusory illness” and the Buddha's various medicines are all the same "illusory medicine.” It expounds that if one speaks of many distinct methods, this is merely conventional and “inverted”, and rhetorically asks, according to the Ekayāna and True Suchness, what increases or decreases, is pure or impure, is good or evil, is sin or merit, is illness or cure. The liturgy then gives the analogy of a person in a dream who dreams of being sick, seeking a doctor and being cured after taking medicine, but who then wakes up and realizes that there is no illness or medication at all in reality. Likewise, sentient beings’ afflictions are ultimately illusions, and the Tathāgata's teachings are likewise skillful illusions. Citing the Lotus Sūtra, the liturgy states that the Dharma spoken by the Buddhas is “one mark and one flavor”: the mark of liberation, the mark of separation, the mark of extinction, and the ultimate attainment of nirvāṇa, returning to emptiness in the end. The liturgy then states that, just like how rain falls from one cloud but nourishes medicinal trees of various sizes, the assembly has now, through the Buddha's grace, heard the name of “Yaoshi Liuli Guang Rulai” and will therefore no longer suffer the hardship of illness, ultimately attaining Unsurpassed Bodhi. For this reason, they vow from this day until the end of their lives to “share one mind” in taking refuge in the Buddha, Dharma, and Saṅgha. The assembly once again chants the extended list of Buddhas, Bodhisattvas, and holy beings as an act of refuge.

Tang dynasty (618–907) painting of Yaoshi. Held at the Palace Museum in Beijing.

A third major repentance section then follows. The assembly chants a list of practical instructions for sentient beings who wish to be freed from the suffering of illnesses. The liturgy advises others to uphold for that person the eight precepts for seven days and seven nights; to offer food, drink, and other requisites to the monastic saṅgha according to their abilities; and to worship and circumambulate day and night in the six periods of practice, making offerings to Yaoshi. They are enjoined to recite the Yaoshi jing forty-nine times, and to light forty-nine lamps whose light remains unextinguished for forty-nine days. By doing so, the liturgy promises, the sick person can attain deliverance from grave dangers, and avoid harm from various evil ghosts. In light of this, the liturgy states, the present assembly diligently burns incense, scatters flowers, lights lamps, hangs banners, engages in life release, and cultivates merit, so that they may be delivered from suffering and freed from misfortunes. The assembly then humbly requests Yaoshi to act as the witness of their repentance. The participants confess that from beginningless time up to the present, whatever they have done that does not accord with their wishes is entirely due to karmic retribution from past evil deeds. Therefore, they must now exert themselves in repentance.The assembly then enumerates a series of karmic consequences that they repent for, namely the karmic retributions of: nightmares and omens and various misfortunes in the human realm; evil illnesses that persist for months and years, leaving one bedridden and unable to rise in the human realm; epidemics and pestilences of winter and summer as well as plagues and febrile diseases in the human realm; disasters of water, fire, thieves, and weapons in the human realm; injuries inflicted by lions, tigers, wolves, poisonous snakes, scorpions and centipedes in the human realm; the sorrows and suffering of birth, aging, sickness, and death in the human realm; the accumulation of evil karma through body, speech, and mind of all sentient beings; the rebirths in the three evil destinies where one endures severe torment for innumerable thousands of years of all sentient beings; the endless transmigrations through the hell realm, animal realm, and hungry ghost realm of all sentient beings, so that they will no longer be reborn in any of the evil destinies; the rebirths as slaves and servants driven by others of all sentient beings; the rebirths as oxen, horses, camels, and donkeys constantly beaten and forced to bear heavy loads while tormented by hunger and thirst of all sentient beings; as well as the effects of harmful magic, curses, poisons, flying corpses, malevolent spirits, and deceptive supernatural disturbances in the human realm. These present and future calamities in human and heavenly realms, namely countless disasters, plagues, and fatal afflictions, are all brought before Yaoshi and the “ocean-like assembly of holy beings” as the assembly repent of them and begs for all such karmic retributions to be completely extinguished. The liturgy reiterates that “disease” and “medicine” ultimately return to a single illusion, and declares that that karmic retributions and obstacles arise from evil karma. The assembly then performs a grand dedication of merit. They vow that the merit produced by this repentance of the three obstacles (arising from afflictions, karma and retribution) is entirely dedicated and shared with all sentient beings so that all may repent together. A long series of aspirations is then recited. The assembly prays that all sentient beings, from now until enlightenment, remember the sufferings of birth and death, arouse bodhicitta, abandon evil and cultivate good, turn away from evil and return to righteousness, enjoy incalculable and inextinguishable bodily and mental peace, abundant food and clothing, flourishing families, full granaries and treasuries, dignified forms, keen intelligence, wisdom, courage, and power, with generals protecting them as well as the Buddhas and divine beings supporting them, and that all their undertakings be successful.

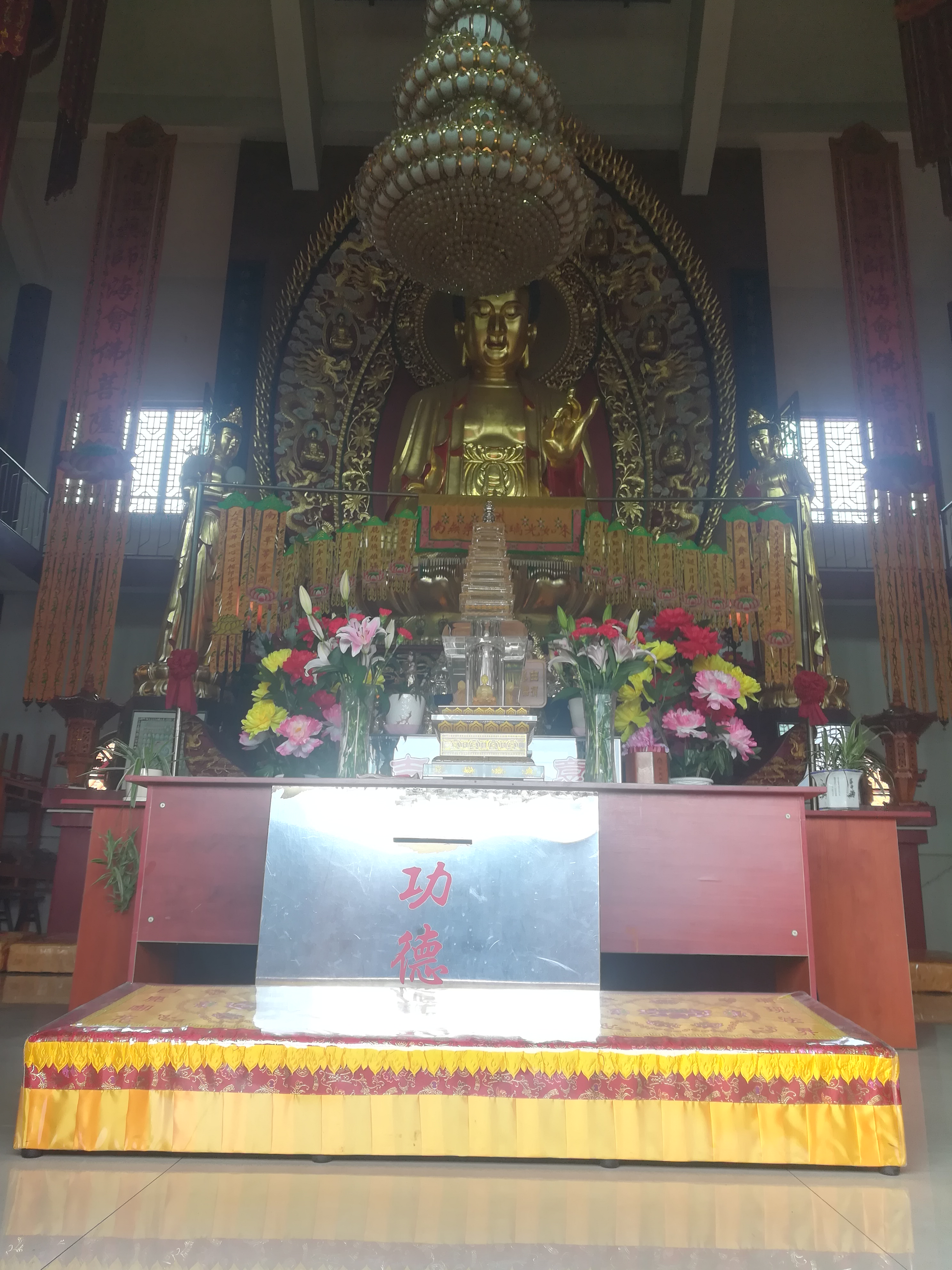
Statues of Yaoshi Fo at White Deer Temple in Hunan, China.

The assembly further wishes that they speedily attain Bodhi, adorned with brilliant marks, radiant lights and supreme majesty; that all sentient beings beings illuminated by the light awaken and pursue their chosen wholesome endeavors; that all sentient beings obtain inexhaustible resources and lack nothing in their possessions; that all sentient beings establish the Mahāyāna and abide securely on the Bodhi path; that all sentient beings maintain unbroken precepts (and if broken, regain purity); that all sentient beings be upright and wise, possess complete faculties and freedom from illness; that all sentient beings have every kind of sickness dispelled and household prosperity ensured; that all sentient beings transform from female to male, endowed with the marks of a great person, until they attain Bodhi; that all beings escape Māra’s nets and the entanglements of heterodox teachings; that those oppressed by grief, and sorrow from legal punishments be liberated; that all sentient beings have sufficient food and drink and ultimately, through the taste of the Dharma, ultimately attain peace and happiness; that all sentient beings obtain the garments they desire; that all sentient beings enjoy long life, wealth, high office, as well as male and female offspring, and that whatever they seek be accomplished. The assembly then requests that in all worlds, strange disasters, the nine kinds of untimely death, the eight difficulties and three calamities, foreign invasions, bandits and rebellions, and all other evil disasters be entirely eradicated; that the realm be peaceful, the winds and rains arrive in season, grains and crops ripen, and that all sentient beings be free of illness and full of joy, have their Bodhi vows and practices increase in clarity in every moment and always think of relieving suffering beings as if they were their own. The assembly further wishes that, in lifetime after lifetime, wherever they are, they will be reborn far from border regions, in families of right faith, with dignified appearance, wisdom, eloquence, freedom from evil dharmas, closeness to good spiritual friends, firm adherence to discipline, and establishment in the Mahāyāna. The assembly also prays that, in lifetime after lifetime, wherever they are, they may promote and manifest the Buddha-Dharma, break the nets of demons, vigorously cultivate the six pāramitās, widely cultivate offerings, perfect merit and wisdom, practice patience and diligence, and ultimately realize the Bodhi path. The assembly then concludes that the practitioners must constantly recollect and repay the compassion and virtue of Yaoshi by ceaselessly benefiting and bringing peace and happiness to all beings. Thus thee assembly again single-mindedly take refuge and bow in reverence.

The Yaoshi Guanding Zhenyan is then recited once more, followed by a final short hymn praising Yaoshi as the supreme physician-king of the East:

東方端坐，無上醫王。
十二大願妙難量，滅罪殄災殃。
降福垂祥，增益壽綿長。

Translation:

Seated upright in the east, the unsurpassed medicine king.
The wonders of his twelve great vows are hard to fathom, eradicating sins and extinguishing disasters.
Bestowing fortune and giving luck, increasing and prolonging lifespans.

As in volume one, volume two concludes with more recitations of Yaoshi's name as well as "Namo Xiaozai Yanshou Yaoshi Fo" by the assembly while they circumambulate the altar and dedicate the accumulated merits.

=== Volume Three ===
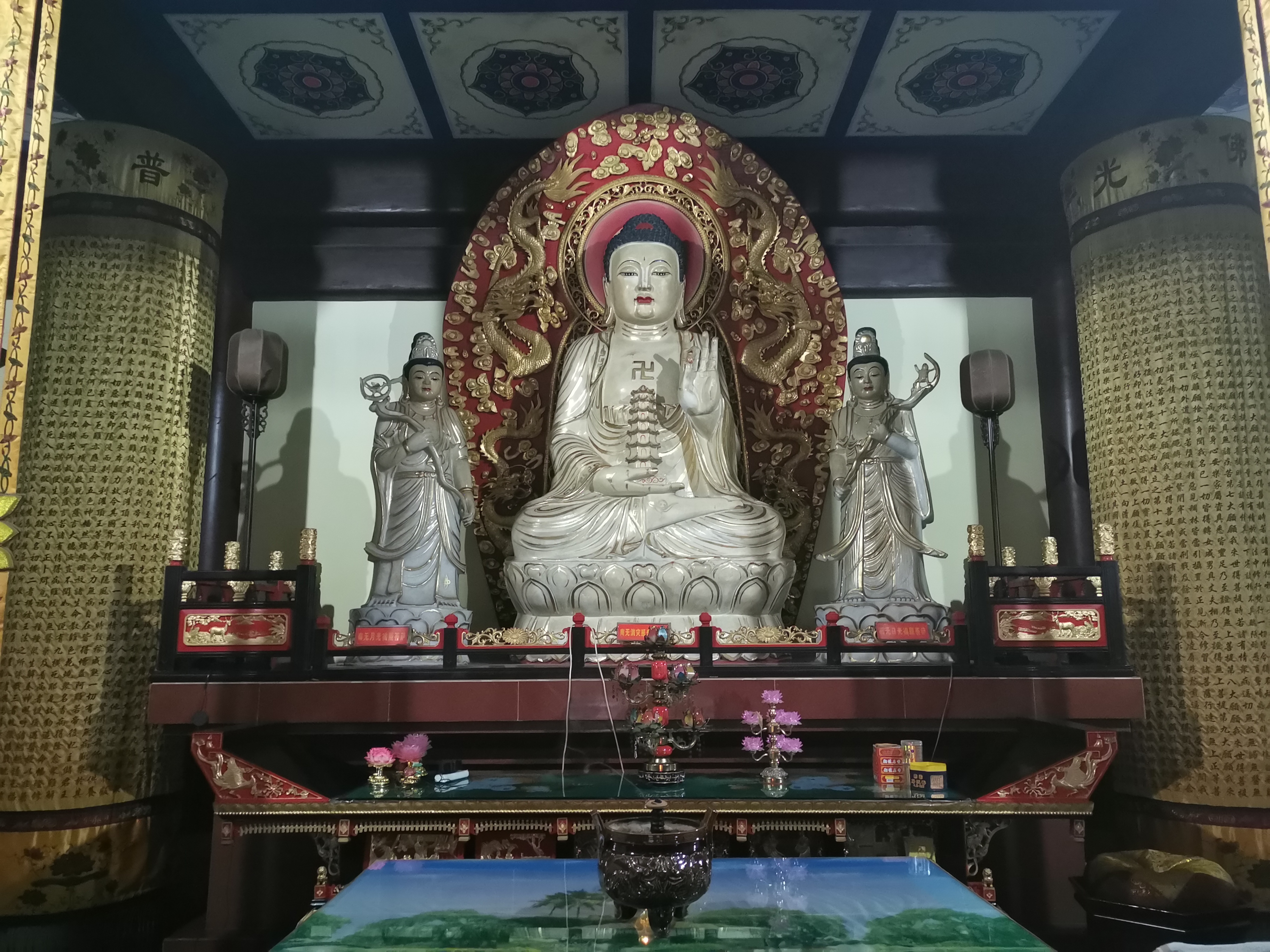
Statues of Yaoshi Fo with his attendant Bodhisattvas Sūryaprabha and Candraprabha flanking him at Haihui Temple in Hunan, China.

Volume three opens with an invocatory verse that describes the Buddha's salvatory activities:

佛身充滿於法界，普現一切眾生前。
隨緣赴感靡不周，而恒處此菩提座。

Translation:

The Buddha's body pervades the Dharma Realm, universally manifesting before all sentient beings.
Meticulously responding to karmic needs, yet remaining eternally abiding upon this bodhi seat.

The liturgy then states that all Buddhas, out of pity for sentient beings, have proclaimed the Yaoshi Bao Chan. The assembly again takes refuge in all Buddhas and chants their refuge in the same extended list of Buddhas, Bodhisattvas, and holy figures introduced in volume one.

Having bowed to the Buddhas, the assembly proceeds to another formal repentance section. According to the liturgy, since they have already confessed earlier offenses, the assembly should now generate a “mind free of defilement and turbidity, without anger or harm,” and develop the four immeasurables benefits of happiness, compassion, joy, and equanimity toward all sentient beings. Following this, they should gather their thoughts and contemplate correctly, neither severing afflictions nor dwelling in the sea of afflictions, and observe that all dharmas (phenomena) are empty. The assembly then chants a short meditation on the mind's nature: this “deluded mind” that arises in accordance with conditions, does it arise because of the mind or not because of the mind? Is it both because of the mind and not because of the mind, or neither? Does it exist in any of the three periods (past, present, future), or in any definite location, namely inside, outside, or in between? Searching through all these possibilities, the assembly is to recognize that the mind is ultimately unobtainable, “like a dream or an illusion, without name or form.” At that point, one no longer sees the mind as saṃsāra, nor as nirvāṇa; They neither obtain what to observe nor the observer. There is “no grasping nor relinquishing, no reliance and no attachment, and also no dwelling in stillness”. It is beyond the reach of language and cannot be expressed in words. The liturgy states that, contemplating the mind as no-mind, “sin and merit have no owner”; the nature of both sin and merit is empty, and so all dharmas are empty. When the mind has nothing to take as a mind, and dharmas do not abide in any dharmas, then to perform repentance in this way is called “great repentance”, also called “repentance that breaks up mind and cognition”. Because of this, each moment of mind is extinguished and each moment of thought does not abide, like the great void (even void itself is described as ultimately ungraspable). The result is a state that “naturally surpasses all samādhis”: luminosity shines forth, all dharmas (phenomena) appear clearly, all-pervading and unobstructed, vast as dharma-nature, ultimately like the void. The assembly then prays that these contemplative aspirations may be attained and that the Bodhi-vows be fulfilled, followed by another round of prostration and refuge in the same Buddha and Bodhisattva assembly listed above.

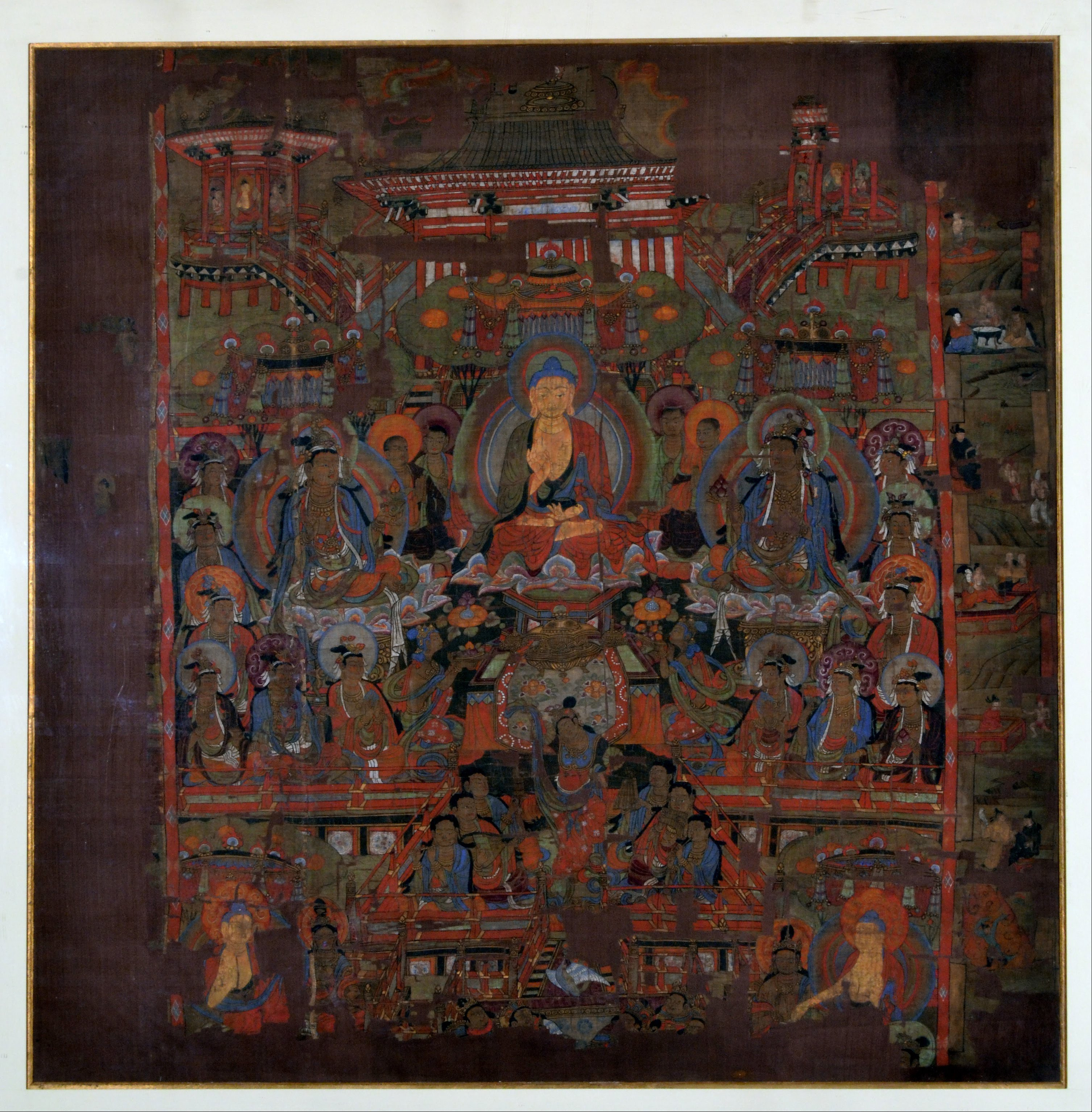
7th-8th century painting of the Pure Land of Yaoshi, from Dunhuang in Gansu, China. Currently located at the National Museum of India.

At this point the assembly engages in the contemplation of the real mark of the mind. The liturgy specifies that, at each and every moment and in each and every activity, the assembly should maintain single-minded recollection of the Triple Gem and contemplate the mind's nature as emptiness. They should not, for even a moment, indulge in thoughts of the five desires or worldly affairs, or give rise to evil thoughts, or engage in idle talk or laughter with outsiders, or become attached to forms and sounds, giving rise to unwholesome actions and neutral but afflictive mental proliferation, thus failing to practice the Dharma correctly. If, on the other hand, one's thoughts remain continuously aligned with real mark, and one is not sparing even of one's life in practicing repentance for the sake of all beings, this is called “genuine single-minded vīrya” and “adorning oneself with the Dharma.” The ritual then directs the assembly once again to take refuge in and prostrate to the ever-abiding Triple Gem and repeats the same invocatory list of Buddhist divinities.

This is followed by a final repentance section. The assembly, together with all beings throughout the Dharma Realm, acknowledge that from beginningless time they have been bound by the three obstacles (arising from afflictions, karma and retribution), their minds obscured so that they give rise to cravings and attachments toward objects and conditions. They proclaim that they lacked wisdom and faith, and have committed a wide variety of bodily, verbal, and mental misdeeds, even to the point of slandering the true Dharma and breaking śīla. They admit that even when living in Pure Lands, their saintly fruits are unperfected, subtle defilements still flow, and samādhi is hard to accomplish. Now that they have encountered Yaoshi Liuli Guang Rulai, they can swiftly remove karmic obstacles and brings forth marvelous enlightenment. Hence, the assembly chants that they wholeheartedly turn toward him, bow their heads to the ground, expose their offenses, and beg for repentance. They pray that the "great ocean of compassion and vows" will equally embrace them and all sentient beings, so that their former obstacles are naturally removed, they attain liberation from all difficulties, their shell of ignorance is broken, their river of afflictions is dried up, their right view is awakened, their wondrous mind made clear, they abide peacefully in Bodhi with “constant light before them”, they enjoy the freedom from illnesses and peace that they joyfully seek, they obtain abundant adornments according to their minds, they possess keen faculties and become learned and discerning, and that they diligently keep pure brahmacarya and entering samādhi. They further pray that through “immeasurable wisdom and skilful means,” sentient beings are provided with all that they require without lack, and that they skillfully practicing various Bodhisattva deeds, and quickly attaining unsurpassed perfect enlightenment. The liturgy then turns explicitly to Pure Land aspirations: it prays that at the time of death practitioners may be clear-minded and calm, “decisively” reborn in the Western Pure Land of Amituofo, guided there by the Eight Great Bodhisattvas. Within a jewelled lotus they will naturally be reborn, receive prediction from the Buddha, obtain innumerable dhāraṇī gates, and perfectly fulfill all merits. Thereafter, they will emanate countless bodies throughout the ten directions; in a single thought they will offer to all Buddhas of the Dharma Realm as well as manifest all manners of supernatural powers to liberate all beings, bringing them to perfect enlightenment. The assembly promises that even if the void should come to an end, their vow will not. After stating that repentance and vows have thus been made, the liturgy again bows to the “eternally abiding Triple Gem” and recites the full Yaoshi Guanding Zhenyan again.

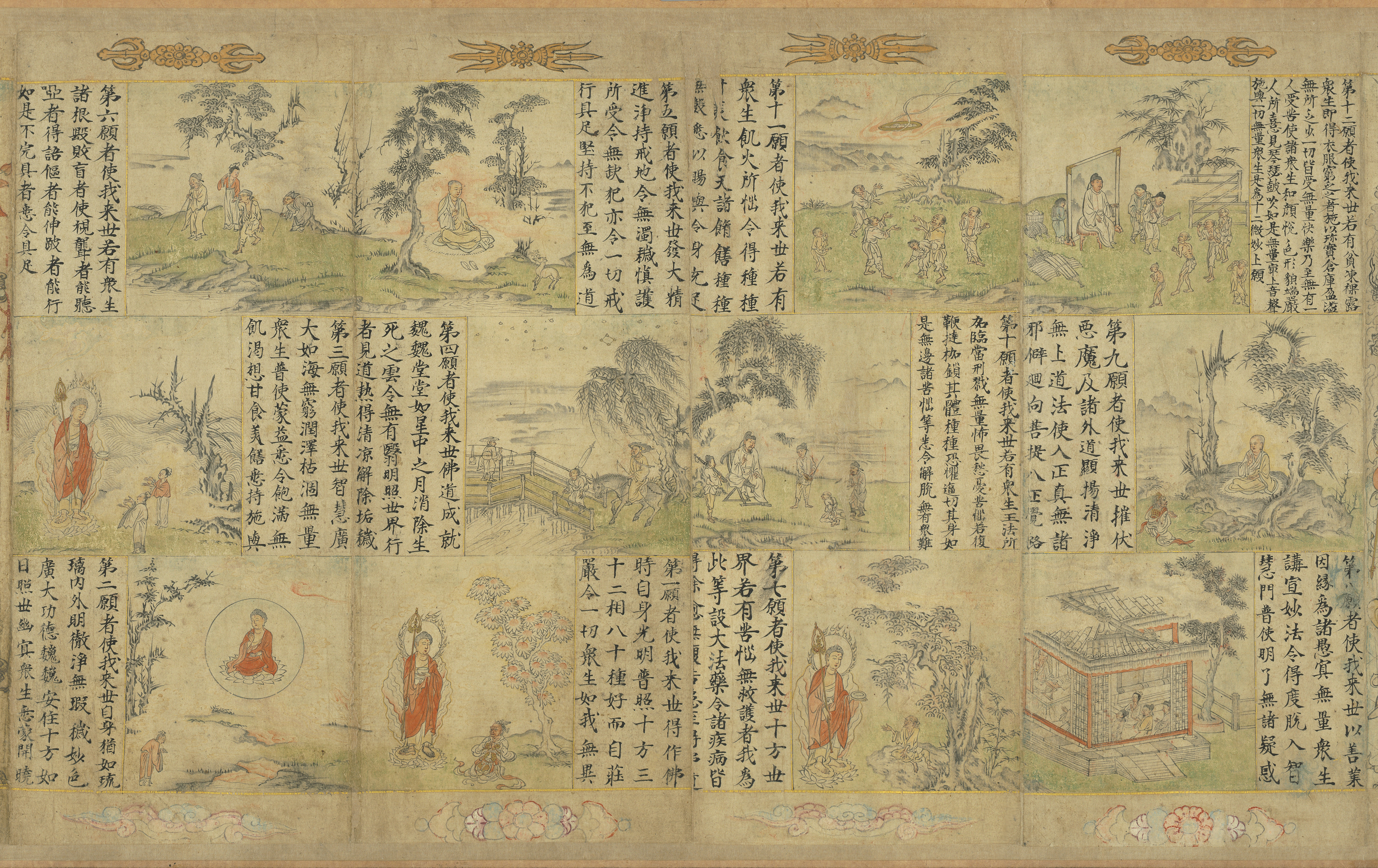
12th century painting depicting Yaoshi's Twelve Great Vows by Zhang Shengwen from the Dali Kingdom (937–1253) in modern-day Yunnan, China. Held at the National Palace Museum in Taiwan.

This is followed by another short eulogy to the assembly of Yaoshi and its blazing light, mentioning the Eight Great Bodhisattvas and Seven Buddhas who assist in proclaiming the Dharma, and again by repeated recitation of “Namo Xiaozai Yanshou Yaoshi Fo” while circumambulating the altar. The eulogy states:

藥師海會。熾盛光王。
八大菩薩降吉祥。七佛助宣揚。
日月迴光。福壽永安康。

Translation:

Ocean assembly of Yaoshi, King of Blazing Light (Tejaprabhā).
Eight Great Bodhisattvas bestowing auspiciousness, Seven Buddhas aiding in proclamation.
Sun and moon reflecting radiance, fortune and longevity eternally peaceful and healthy.

As a final element, the liturgy has the assembly kneel and recite a vow liturgy attributed to the Tang dynasty Chan monk Liaoran (瞭然) called the Yishan fayuan wen (怡山發願文, lit: "Vow-making Text of Mount Yi"). It begins with several verses taking refuge in the "Taming Teacher(s) of the ten directions who expound the pure and subtle Dharma" (in Buddhist teachings, sentient beings are likened to wild horses and the Buddha is likened to an animal tamer, with one of his epithets being the Tamer of Men) as well as the “Liberated Sangha of the three vehicles and four fruits” whom the assembly hopes will "bestow compassion and mercifully receive (the assembly)". The assembly next chants a prose section acknowledging that they have deviated from their true nature and fallen into the stream of delusion, drifting in saṃsāra, attached to forms and sounds, accumulated the karma of having āsravas via the ten fetters (lack of conscience, lack of shame, envy, parsimony, remorse, drowsiness, flightiness, slackness, wrath, hypocrisy) and ten afflictions (craving, aversion, delusion, pride, doubt, view of attachment to self, view of attachment to extremes, non-Buddhist religious views, view of attachment to views, view of incorrect attachment to precepts), as well as generating boundless sin through the six senses and six sense-objects. The assembly further admits to being lost in the sea of suffering, drowning on the wrong path, clingig to the self and indulging in attachment to others, upholding what is crooked and discarding what is right as well as accumulating countless karmic over many lifetimes. The assembly then repents to the Triple Gem and prays for the Buddha to liberate them and for virtuous friends to guide and support them, such that they may escape the abyss of afflictions to reach the other shore of Bodhi. The assembly then goes on to articulate aspirations: that worldly fortune and rank flourish in this life, that the seedlings of wisdom flourish in the next, to be born in Madhyadeśa, often meet wise teachers, take ordination as a monastic with right faith, enter the path with childlike innocence, have sharp faculties (six senses) and harmonious body-speech-mind, remain unstained by worldly ties, maintain pure brahmacarya and precepts and remain untouched by worldly defilements, strictly protect their dignity and ensure that even the smallest creature remains unharmed, avoid the eight difficult conditions and lack of the four conditions, have prajñā manifest and bodhicitta never regress, cultivate the true Dharma and fully understand the Mahāyāna, open the gate of the six pāramitās, cross the ocean of the three asaṃkhyeya kalpas (which refers to the length of time a Bodhisattva must spend cultivating before attaining Buddhahood), erect the banners of Dharma everywhere, break the nets of doubt, subdue all Māras, inherit the Triple Gem and making them flourish, serve Buddhas in the ten directions without fatigue, master all Dharma Doors and thoroughly understand them, widely cultivate blessings and wisdom, universally benefit the multitudes of sentient beings, gain the six supernormal powers, and complete Buddhahood in one lifetime.

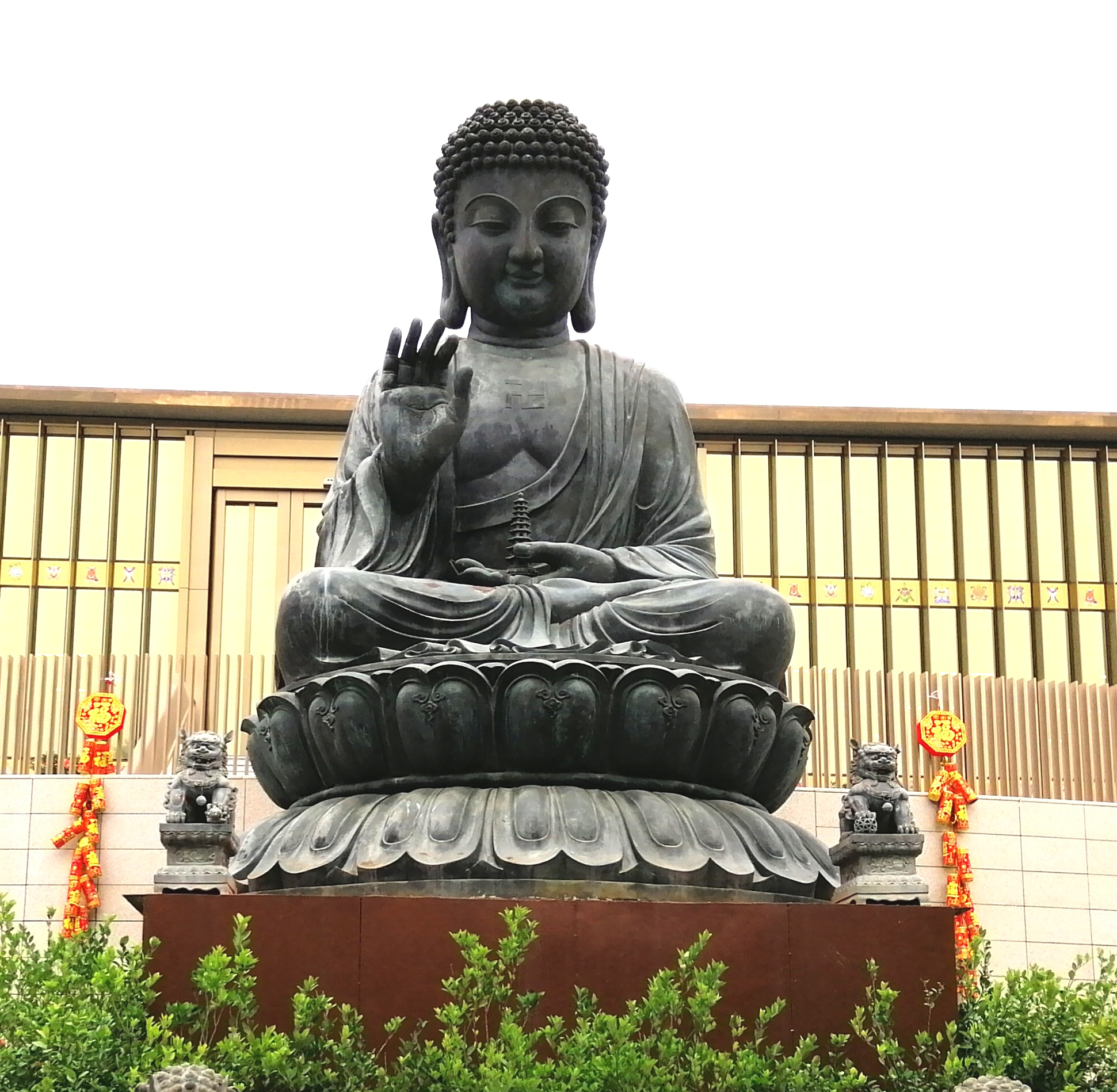
Statue of Yaoshi at Cham Shan Monastery in Hong Kong.

The assembly then vows that, following their previously articulated aspirations, they shall never abandon the Dharma Realm but enter all the myriad worlds that number as many as dust motes, emulate Guanyin’s compassion and Puxian’s vast vows, appear in different bodies in other worlds and this world according to the needs of sentient beings and preach the wondrous Dharma, sometimes emitting great light and sometimes performing various divine transformations even in the evil destinies such as the realms of hells and hungry ghosts. Each member of the assembly vows that all who see their form or even hear their name will arouse bodhicitta and forever be liberated from the sufferings of saṃsāra. The liturgy vividly describes transforming the lands of fiery cauldrons and icy rivers (meaning hells) into fragrant groves, causing those who "eat copper and drink iron” (meaning hungry ghosts) to be reborn in the Pure Land, freeing beings with fur and horns (meaning animals) and those burdened by karmic debt and resentment from bitterness and allowing them to receive benefits and bliss, appearing as herbs in times of plague and as grains in times of famine, as well as benefiting all without exception. Finally, the assembly prays that their karmic creditors from past and future lives as well as their current family members escape the four kinds of birth, abandon attachments built up over countless kalpas, and, together with all sentient beings, attain Buddhahood. The vow closes with the formula: “Even if the void has an end, my vow has no end. May sentient and insentient beings alike together perfect omniscient wisdom.”

The ritual ends with verses for concluding the altar (結壇). The assembly chants that the merit of the repentance is supreme and dedicates them to all sentient beings sinking in suffering such that they may swiftly be reborn in the Pure Land of Amituofo. The assembly then invokes the Buddhas of the three periods (of past, present and future), Wenshu (Mañjuśrī), Puxian, Guanyin, and all great Bodhisattva Mahāsattvas, as well as Mahāprajñāpāramitā, before proclaiming a short verse describing their attributes: "Dwelling in the world, yet like empty space. Resembling the lotus flower, unstained by water. Their minds pure and undefiled, transcending these things. I bow in reverence to the Unsurpassed Honoured One." The liturgy then recites the Three Refuges vows: “I take refuge in the Buddha, may all sentient beings understand the great Way and the unsurpassed mind of the Dharma; I take refuge in the Dharma, may all sentient beings deeply enter the Buddhist canon and attain wisdom as vast as the ocean; I take refuge in the Saṅgha, may all sentient beings guide and harmonize the masses without any obstructions." The assembly then ends the third volume and by proclaiming a salutation to the noble assembly.

== Ritual manual ==
Full digitalized text of the ritual manual

Modern edition of the ritual text for the Yaoshi Bao Chan, printed by the Hebei Buddhist Association (河北省佛教协会).

== See also ==
- Bhaiṣajyaguru, the central figure in the rite
- Fanbai, style of Chinese Buddhist chanting which is typically used to perform the rite
- Dabei Chan, a repentance ritual that is dedicated to Guanyin (Avalokiteśvara)
- Shuilu Fahui
- Yujia Yankou
- Chinese Buddhist liturgy
- Suryukjae
- Monlam Prayer Festival
- Shuni-e
