= Bhaiṣajyaguru Hall =

Chinese Buddhism hall

Chinese name
- Traditional Chinese: 藥師殿
- Simplified Chinese: 药师殿
- Literal meaning: Hall of Bhaisajyaguru
Transcriptions
Standard Mandarin
- Hanyu Pinyin: Yàoshī Diàn

Vietnamese name
- Vietnamese alphabet: Dược Sư Điện
- Chữ Hán: 藥師殿

Korean name
- Hangul: 약사전
- Hanja: 藥師殿
Transcriptions
- Revised Romanization: Yaksajeon
- McCune–Reischauer: Yaksajŏn

Japanese name
- Kanji: 薬師堂
Transcriptions
- Romanization: Yakushi-dō

The Bhaisajyaguru Hall is a hall which enshrines Bhaisajyaguru that can be found in certain East Asian Buddhist temples. As a spiritual center for healing and well-being, it typically features statues or icons of Bhaisajyaguru flanked by his two attendants, the Bodhisattvas Suryaprabha and Chandraprabha, collectively termed the "Three Saints of the East." The hall serves as a place for rituals, prayers, and practices aimed at overcoming physical ailments, mental suffering, and karmic obstacles. The Bhaisajyaguru Hall is called Yaoshi-dian (药师殿; 藥師殿; Yàoshī Diàn) in China, Yakushi-dō (薬師堂) in Japan, Yaksa-jeon (약사전) in Korea, and Dược Sư Điện in Vietnam.

== China ==
In China, the veneration of the Bhaisajyaguru Hall gained prominence during the Tang dynasty (618–907), with scriptures such as the Sutra of the Bhaisajyaguru being translated into Chinese. The hall became a standard feature in Buddhist temples, often serving as a site for prayers for healing and longevity. For example, the Bhaisajyaguru Hall at the Badachu Temple in Beijing underwent a major restoration in 2005 after being sealed for nearly a century. Bhaisajyaguru Hall is often part of a symmetrical monastic layout, situated along the central axis.

Bhaisajyaguru is the hierarch of the Eastern Pure Land, Vaiḍūryanirbhāsā, meaning "Pure Lapis Lazuli". Sitting in the center of the lotus pedestal, the statue of Bhaisajyaguru are usually with kind and solemn deportment, blue body and dark hair. With big ears to his shoulders, he wears the clothes of the Buddha and exposes breast and right arm. Depictions of Bhaisajyaguru are usually found with two bodhisattvas flanking him: the left of Bhaisajyaguru is Sūryaprabha (Sūryaprabha) with a sun wheel in his hand, representing light; on the right is Candraprabha (Candraprabha), with a moon wheel in his hand, representing coolness. This triad is often called "Three Honoured Ones of Bhaisajyaguru" (Chinese: 藥師三尊; pinyin: Yàoshī sānzūn) or "Three Noble ones of the East" (東方三聖; Dōngfāng sānshèng). Many Chinese people believe that enshrining Bhaisajyaguru can cure all diseases, relieve a variety of illness and pain, ward off unluckiness and extend longevity, so since ancient times, people from all walks life worship the Bhaisajyaguru.

== Japan ==
The Bhaisajyaguru was introduced to Japan via China and Korea during the Asuka Period (538–710). Imperial patronage, such as that of Emperor Temmu, led to the construction of temples like Nara's Yakushi-ji, dedicated to healing prayers for the ill. Bhaisajyaguru Hall exhibits distinct styles and the garan layout, which places the hall within a symmetrical compound. Bhaisajyaguru statue often made of lacquered wood or bronze, seated and holding a medicine jar, Suryaprabha and Chandraprabha statues standing on the left and Longnü on the right, and twelve Divine Generals sitting on the seats before both sides of the gable walls.

== Korea ==
Korean Buddhism integrated the Bhaisajyaguru during the Three Kingdoms Period (57 BCE–668 CE), with rituals for healing and protection becoming prevalent in temples. The Bhaisajyaguru Hall is often part of Seon or Cheontae school temples. Bhaisajyaguru Hall structures follow Korean wooden architecture, characterized by elegant, curved roofs, dancheong multicolored paintwork, and stone platforms. Statue of Bhaisajyaguru with a medicine bowl in hand is enshrined in the center with Suryaprabha and Chandraprabha statues lining up on both sides.

== Vietnam ==
In Vietnam, the Bhaisajyaguru was incorporated into Mahayana Buddhism through Chinese influence, with devotion focusing on healing and merit-making. Temples often include a Bhaisajyaguru Hall as a side hall or main sanctuary. Bhaisajyaguru Hall blends Vietnamese architectural elements with local designs, such as curved tile roofs, wooden pillars, and altars adorned with gold leaf. Dragons and phoenixes are common decorative motifs. Bhaisajyaguru statue in seated posture with a medicine bowl is enshrined in the center, with Suryaprabha and Chandraprabha statues are placed on both sides.
