= Bhaiṣajyarāja =

Boddhisattva of healing

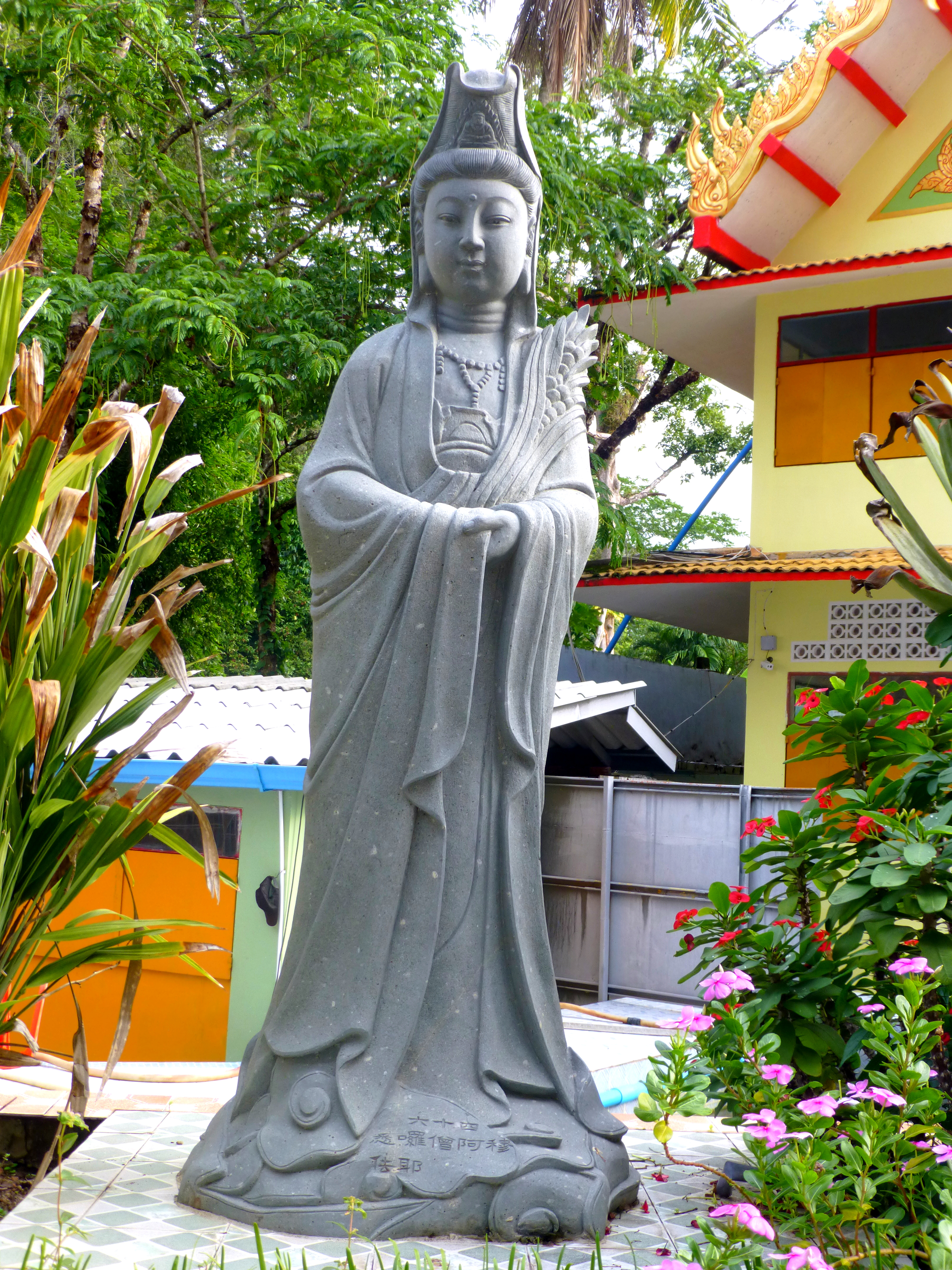
- Sanskrit: भैषज्यराज; Bhaiṣajyarāja
- Chinese: (Traditional) 藥王菩薩 (Simplified) 药王菩萨 (Pinyin: Yàowáng Púsà)
- Japanese: 薬王菩薩(やくおうぼさつ) (romaji: Yakuō Bosatsu)
- Korean: 약왕보살 (RR: Yagwang Bosal)
- Tagalog: Bhaisakyalaja
- Thai: พระไภษัชยราชโพธิสัตว์
- Vietnamese: Dược Vương Bồ Tát

Information
- Venerated by: Mahāyāna, Vajrayāna

Bhaiṣajyarāja (Skt.: भैषज्यराज; Traditional Chinese: 藥王; Simplified Chinese: 药王; pinyin: Yào Wáng; Japanese: 薬王 Yakuō; Korean: 약왕보살; Vietnamese: Dược Vương Bồ Tát), commonly known as the Medicine King Bodhisattva, is a prominent bodhisattva in Mahayana Buddhism associated with healing and medicine. He is one of the Twenty-Five Great Bodhisattvas, and in the future is destined to become the buddha Tathāgata Pure-Eye (淨眼如來). His younger brother is Medicine Superior Bodhisattva (藥上菩薩), later known as Tathāgata Pure-Treasury (淨藏如來).

Medicine King is best known from the Lotus Sutra, where he appears in Chapter 23 ("The Bodhisattva Bhaiṣajyarāja"), as well as in the Sūtra on Visualizing the Bodhisattvas Bhaiṣajyarāja and Bhaiṣajyasamudgata (Chinese: 佛說觀藥王藥上二菩薩經).

He is often depicted alongside his brother as an attendant of Bhaiṣajyaguru (the Medicine Buddha), and in some traditions is equated with Sūryaprabha and Candraprabha. In other contexts, the pair serve as attendants of Śākyamuni or Amitābha, symbolizing the unity of the Buddhas’ virtues. His birthday is celebrated on the 28th day of the 4th lunar month.

== Scriptural Accounts ==
=== Lotus Sutra ===
In Chapter 23 of the Lotus Sutra, the Buddha recounts Medicine King’s former life as the bodhisattva "One-Who-Delights-All-Beings-to-See." He practiced severe austerities for 12,000 years, attained the samādhi of manifesting all bodily forms, and then burned his body as the highest offering to a buddha for 1,200 years. Later reborn in a royal family, he built 84,000 stupas after that buddha’s passing and again offered his own body by burning his arms for 72,000 years. This story emphasizes self-sacrifice and the supreme act of devotion.

In Chapter 27 of the Lotus Sutra, another narrative identifies Medicine King and Medicine Superior as the two sons, Pure-Eye and Pure-Treasury, of King Wonderful-Adornment and Queen Pure-Virtue. Through their efforts, they converted their father to the Dharma while receiving the teaching of the buddha Cloud-Thunder-Sound-Star-King-Flower-Wisdom.

=== Other Traditions ===
Another origin story relates that in the distant past, during the age of semblance dharma following the nirvana of Radiant-Lapis Tathāgata, a layman named Starlight offered Himalayan medicines to the monk Sun-Treasury and vowed to free beings from disease. His brother Lightning Bright also made offerings and aspired to Buddhahood. The assembly praised them as Medicine King and Medicine Superior, names they carried across kalpas until their vows were fulfilled, with Medicine King destined to become Tathāgata Pure-Eye and Medicine Superior to become Tathāgata Pure-Treasury.

== Iconography ==
Medicine King Bodhisattva is usually depicted wearing a jeweled crown, the left hand at the waist in a fist, and the right hand raised at the chest holding a medicinal plant. His samaya attribute is a medicinal herb or a lotus flower.

Texts describe his body as twelve yojanas in height, radiant with purple-gold light, possessing the thirty-two marks and eighty secondary features of a Buddha. From the crown protuberance arise fourteen jewels, each with fourteen facets and flowers, reflecting Buddhas of the ten directions. From the white tuft between his brows shines a crystal light, and jewels rain from the tips of his fingers.

== Veneration ==
In the Medicine Master Sutra, Medicine King is one of the eight great bodhisattvas in the retinue of Bhaiṣajyaguru.

In Chinese Buddhism, legendary physicians such as Shennong, Qibo, Bian Que, Dong Feng, Hua Tuo, Sun Simiao, and Wu Tao have been identified as incarnations of Medicine King Bodhisattva. Some regional temples thus enshrine him in the form of a middle-aged man wearing Hanfu.
