= Bhaiṣajyasamudgata =

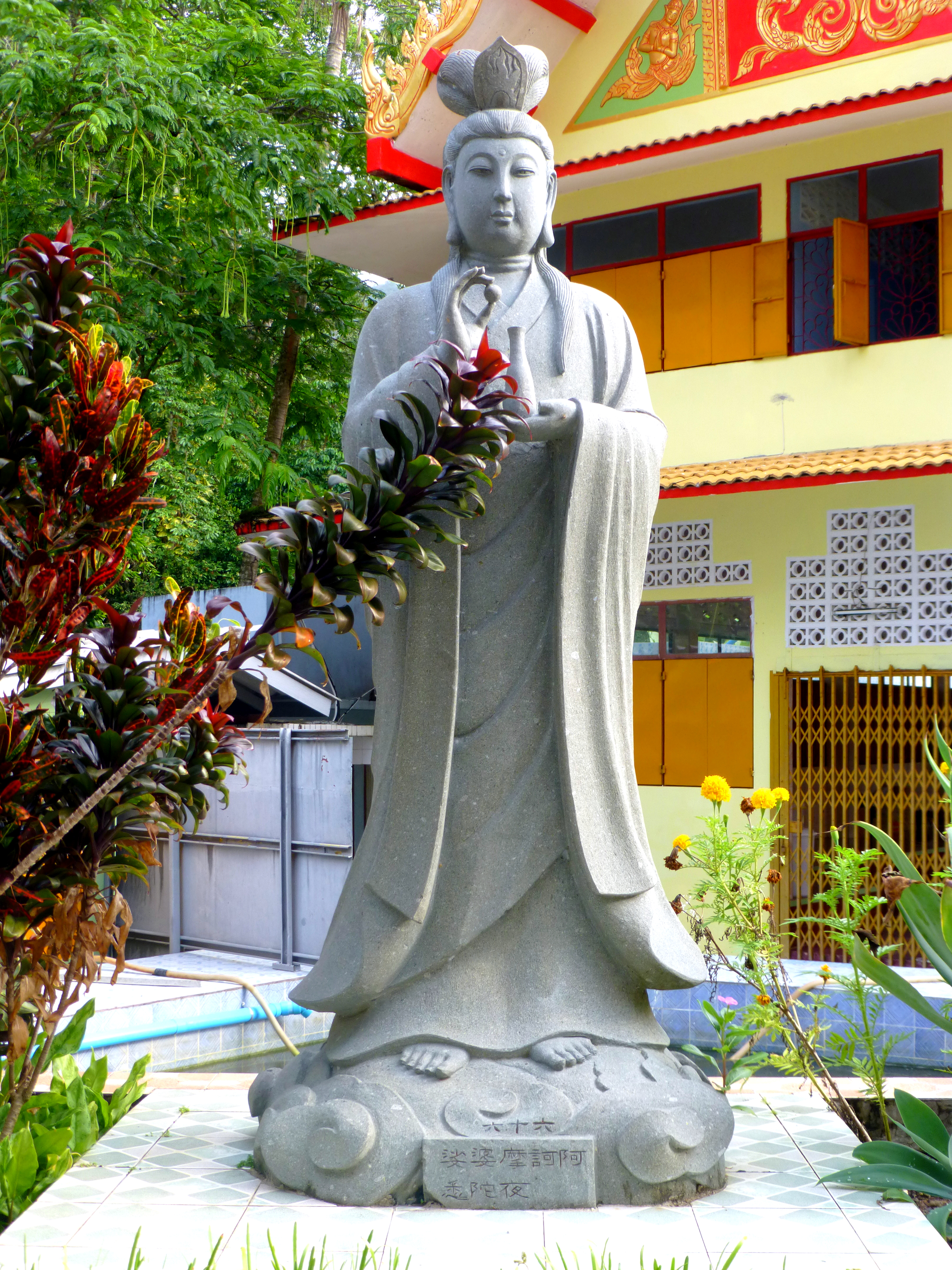
- Sanskrit: भैषज्यसमुद्गत; Bhaiṣajyasamudgata
- Chinese: (Traditional) 藥上菩薩 (Simplified) 药上菩萨 (Pinyin: Yàoshàng Púsà)
- Japanese: 薬上菩薩(やくじょうぼさつ) (romaji: Yakujō Bosatsu)
- Korean: 약상보살 (RR: Yagsang Bosal)
- Thai: พระไภษัชยสมุทคทโพธิสัตว์
- Vietnamese: Dược Thượng Bồ Tát

Information
- Venerated by: Mahāyāna, Vajrayāna

Bhaiṣajyasamudgata (Sanskrit: भैषज्यसमुद्गत; or Medicine Risen) is a bodhisattva mentioned within the Lotus Sutra and the Bhaiṣajyarāja-bhaiṣajyasamudgata-sūtra (Chinese: 佛說觀藥王藥上二菩薩經; Sūtra Spoken by the Buddha on Visualizing the Two Bodhisattvas Bhaisajyarāja and Bhaisajyasamudgata). In chapter 23 of the Lotus Sutra (The Bodhisattva Bhaiṣajyarāja), the Buddha tells the story of Bhaiṣajyasamudgata's brother the 'Medicine King' Bodhisattva, who, in a previous life, burnt his body as a supreme offering to a Buddha. He is said to have been reborn over a period of numerous lifetimes healing and curing diseases, and is a representation of the healing power of the Buddha.
