= Sūryaprabha =

Bodhisattva whose specialty is sunlight and good health

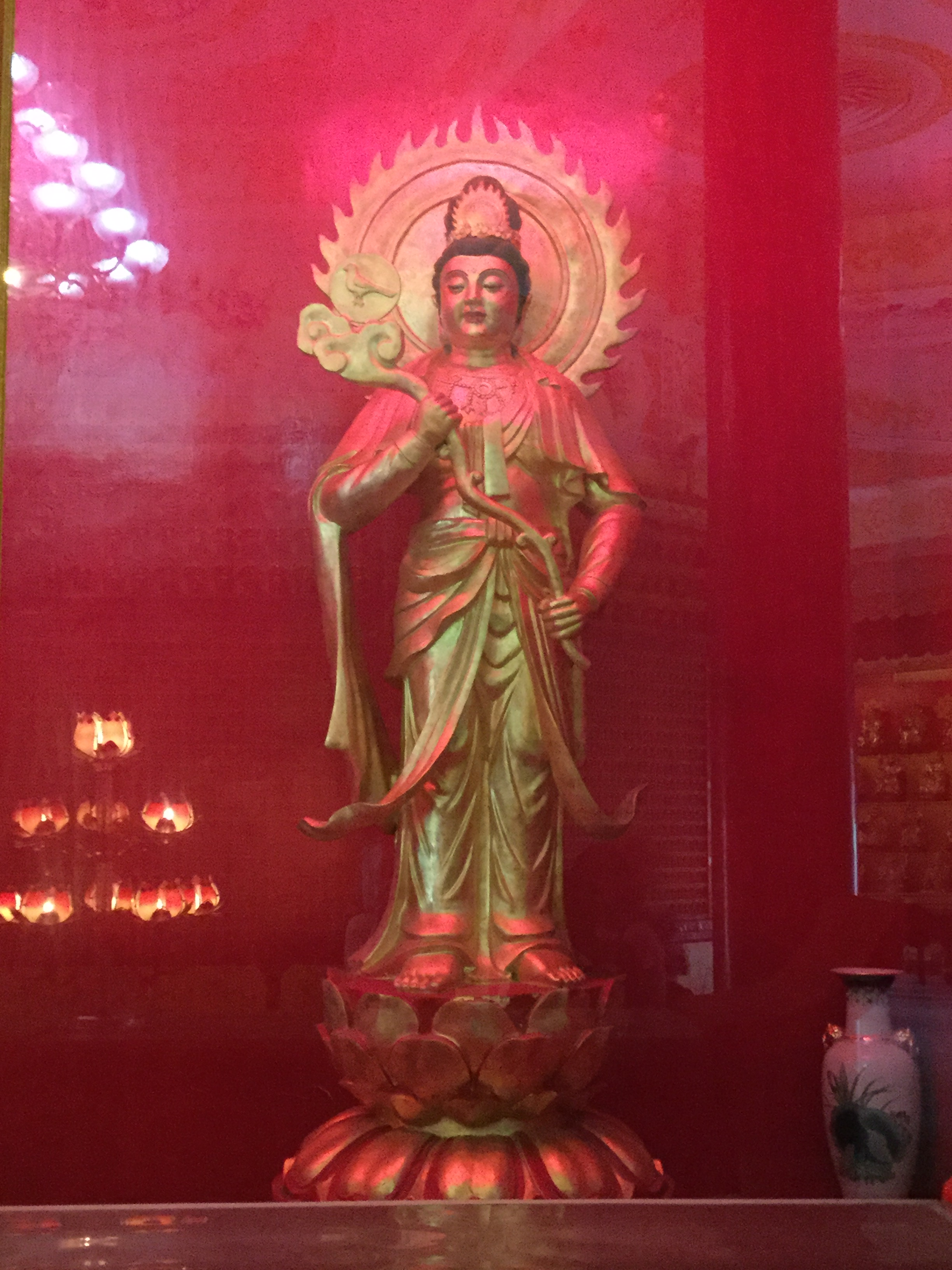
- Sūryaprabha, Tiantan Garden, Shantou
- Sanskrit: सूर्यप्रभ; Sūryaprabha
- Chinese: 日光菩薩 (Pinyin: Rìguāng Púsà) 日光遍照菩薩 (Pinyin: Rìguāng Biànzhào Púsà)) 日光普照菩薩 (Pinyin: Rìguāng Pǔzhào Púsà) 日曜菩薩 (Pinyin: Rìyào Púsà
- Japanese: 日光菩薩(にっこうぼさつ) (romaji: Nikkō Bosatsu) 日光遍照菩薩(にっこうへんじょうぼさつ) (romaji: Nikkō Henjō Bosatsu) 日光普照菩薩(にっこうふしょうぼさつ) (romaji: Nikkō Fushō Bosatsu) 日照王菩薩(にっしょうおうぼさつ) (romaji: Nisshō Ō Bosatsu)
- Korean: 일광보살 (RR: Ilgwang Bosal) 일광변조보살 (RR: Ilgwang Byeonjo Bosal) 일요보살 (RR: Ilyo Bosal)
- Tagalog: Sulyaplabha
- Thai: พระสุริยประภาโพธิสัตว์
- Tibetan: ཉི་མའི་འོད་ Wylie: nyi ma'i 'od THL: nyimé ö
- Vietnamese: Nhật Quang Bồ Tát

Information
- Venerated by: Mahayana, Vajrayana: (Bhaiṣajyaguru Sūtra)

Sūryaprabha (literally "Sunlight", Chinese: 日光菩薩; pinyin: Rìguāng Púsà; Rōmaji: Nikkō Bosatsu) is a bodhisattva whose specialty is sunlight and good health. Sūryaprabha is often seen with Candraprabha, as the two siblings serve Bhaiṣajyaguru. Statues of the two closely resemble each other and are commonly found together, sometimes flanking temple doors. They are also recognized in mainland Asia as devas.

In Chinese folk religion, the solar god Taiyang Xingjun is depicted as his incarnation. His sacred day is the first day of the second lunar month in the Chinese calendar.

== In literature ==
The Scripture of the Medicine Buddha (Bhaisajya-guru-vaidūrya-sūtra) states: "In that country, there are two Bodhisattvas, Mahāsattvas: one named Sun Illuminating All and the other named Moon Illuminating All. They are the supreme among the countless Bodhisattvas."

The Empowerment Sutra (灌顶经) states: "There are two Bodhisattvas, one named Sun Radiance (Nichiyō) and the other named Moon Purity (Gekjō). They are the successors to the Buddha's position, both have the ability to uphold the true Dharma Treasure of the Medicine Buddha."

The Record of Awakening and Zen quotes from Volume 1 of the Commentary on the Scripture of the Medicine Buddha (药师经疏): In the past world, during the time of Dipankara, a Brahman (a Hindu priest or ascetic) and his two sons made a shared Bodhisattva vow to alleviate the suffering of all sentient beings. Impressed by their determination, Dipankara advised the Brahman to change his name to "Yao Wang" (Medicine King) and his sons to "Ri Zhao" (Sunlight) and "Yue Zhao" (Moonlight). Through their spiritual journey, the trio achieved enlightenment—the Brahman becoming the Medicine Buddha and his sons attaining the forms of Sunlight Bodhisattva and Moonlight Bodhisattva.

It's believed that Moonlight Bodhisattva, like Sunlight Bodhisattva, also has a close connection to the Great Compassion Mantra (Da Bei Zhou) of Avalokiteśvara Bodhisattva. For all practitioners who wholeheartedly recite the Great Compassion Mantra, Moonlight Bodhisattva, along with countless divine beings, will come to enhance the efficacy of their mantra recitation. After reciting the Great Compassion Mantra, if practitioners can further recite the Moonlight Bodhisattva Dharani, Moonlight Bodhisattva will come to offer protection, enabling the practitioner to eliminate all obstacles and illnesses, accomplish all virtuous dharmas, and stay away from various fears.

== See also ==
- Index of Buddhism-related articles
