= Candraprabha =

Bodhisattva

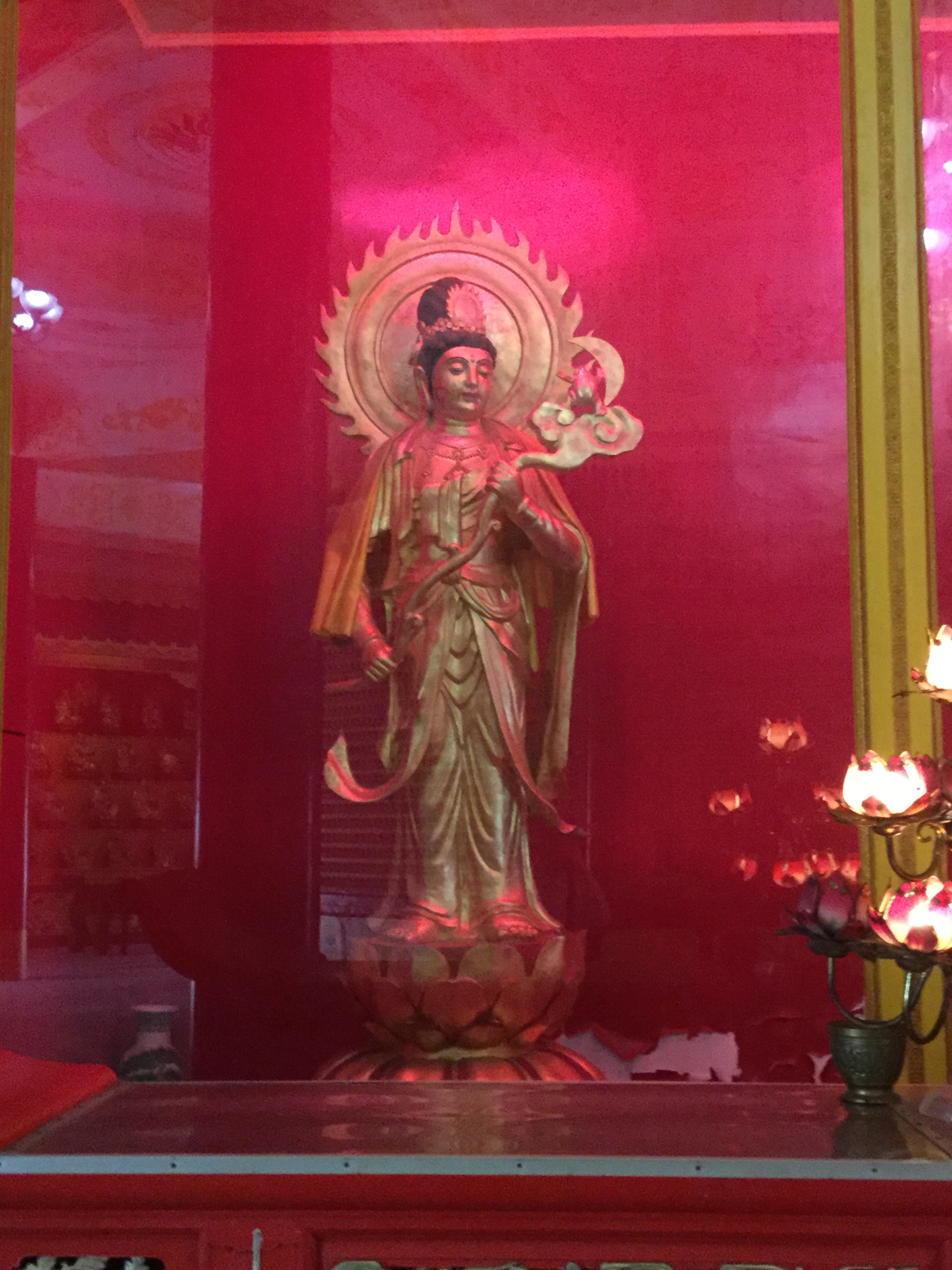
- Candraprabha, Tiantan Garden, Shantou
- Sanskrit: चन्द्रप्रभ; Candraprabha
- Chinese: 月光菩薩 (Pinyin: Yuèguāng Púsà) 月光遍照菩薩 (Pinyin: Yuèguāng Biànzhào Púsà)) 月光普照菩薩 (Pinyin: Yuèguāng Pǔzhào Púsà) 月净菩薩 (Pinyin: Yuèyào Púsà
- Japanese: 月光菩薩(がっこう/げっこうぼさつ) (romaji: Gakkō Bosatsu or Gekkō Bosatsu) 月光遍照菩薩(がっこうへんじょうぼさつ) (romaji: Gakkō Henjō Bosatsu) 月光王菩薩(がっこうおうぼさつ) (romaji: Gakkō Ō Bosatsu) 月浄菩薩(がつじょうぼさつ) (romaji: Getsujō Bosatsu)
- Khmer: ចន្ទ្រប្រភា (chan-pra-phiea)
- Korean: 월광보살 (RR: Wolgwang Bosal) 월광변조보살 (RR: Wolgwang Byeonjo Bosal) 월정보살 (RR: Woljaeng Bosal)
- Tagalog: Candlaplabha
- Thai: พระจันทรประภาโพธิสัตว์
- Tibetan: ཟླ་འོད་ Wylie: zla 'od THL: da ö
- Vietnamese: Nguyệt Quang Bồ Tát

Information
- Venerated by: Mahayana, Vajrayana: (Bhaiṣajyaguru Sūtra)

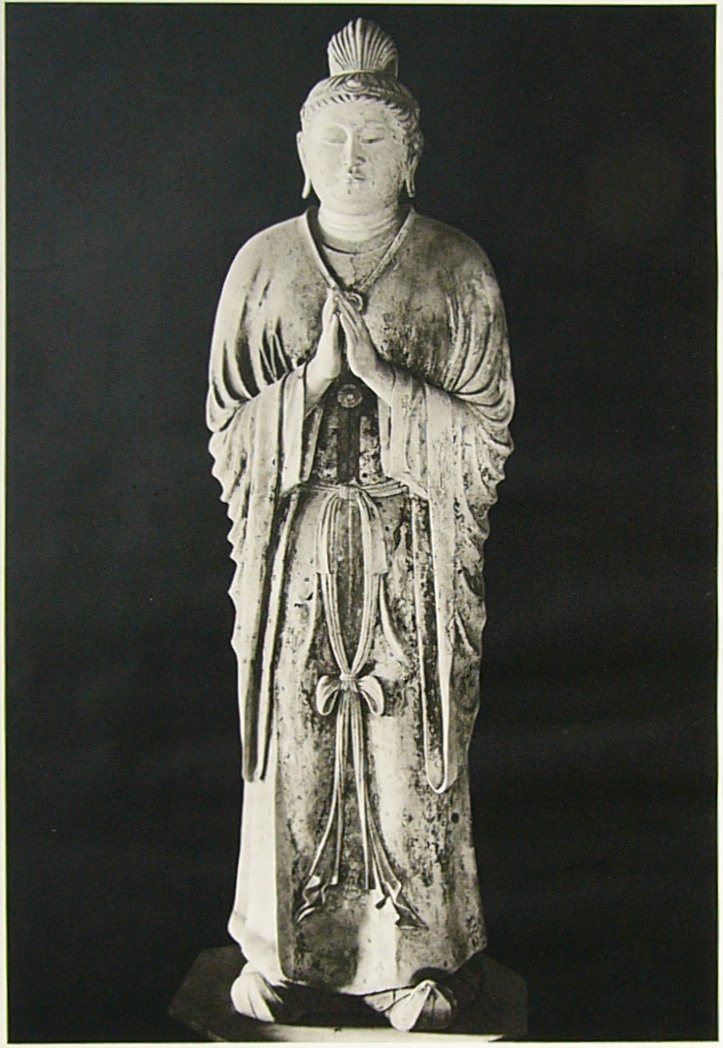
Gakkō Bosatsu, Nara period, Tōdai-ji, Nara

Candraprabha (lit. 'Moonlight', Chinese: 月光菩薩; pinyin: Yuèguāng Púsà; Rōmaji: Gakkō or Gekkō Bosatsu) is a bodhisattva often seen with Sūryaprabha, as the two siblings serve Bhaiṣajyaguru. Statues of Candraprabha and Sūryaprabha closely resemble each other and are commonly found together, sometimes flanking temple doors. They are also recognized in mainland Asia as devas. In Chinese folk religion, the moon god Taiyin Xingjun is depicted as his incarnation while also known as the Yuehui Bodhisattva (月慧菩萨) in Yiguandao.

== In Mandalas ==
Within the Vajra Dhātu Mandala (金刚界), Moonlight Bodhisattva resides in the western portion of the Second Court of the Micro Assembly. The figure is depicted with a white body, the left hand forming a fist at the waist and the right hand holding either a moon-shaped object or a lotus flower adorned with a half-moon. Moonlight Bodhisattva's secret name is Kṣīti-garbha Vajra, and their Samaya symbol takes the form of a half-moon.

In the Garbhadhātu Mandala (胎藏界), Moonlight Bodhisattva occupies a place in the Mañjuśrī Courtyard (Mañjuśrī-vihāra). Positioned to the right of Maitrīyaka (the Auspicious One) and situated between Viśvabhūṣaka (the Bodhisattva of Melodious Sound) and Amitābha Prabhā (the Bodhisattva of Immaculate Light), Moonlight Bodhisattva holds a lotus flower in the right hand, upon which rests a half-moon. The left hand forms a gesture at the chest, holding a pair of joined lotus flowers. The Bodhisattva sits upon a lotus throne in a cross-legged meditative pose. In this mandala, Moonlight Bodhisattva's secret name is Vajra-tejas, and their Samaya symbol is a blue lotus flower with a half-moon placed atop it.

== In literature ==
The Scripture of the Medicine Buddha (Bhaisajya-guru-vaidūrya-sūtra) states: "In that country, there are two Bodhisattvas, Mahāsattvas: one named Sun Illuminating All and the other named Moon Illuminating All. They are the supreme among the countless Bodhisattvas."

The Empowerment Sutra (灌顶经) states: "There are two Bodhisattvas, one named Sun Radiance (Nichiyō) and the other named Moon Purity (Gekjō). They are the successors to the Buddha's position, both have the ability to uphold the true Dharma Treasure of the Medicine Buddha."

The Record of Awakening and Zen quotes from Volume 1 of the Commentary on the Scripture of the Medicine Buddha (药师经疏): In the past world, during the time of Dipankara, a Brahman (a Hindu priest or ascetic) and his two sons made a shared Bodhisattva vow to alleviate the suffering of all sentient beings. Impressed by their determination, Dipankara advised the Brahman to change his name to "Yao Wang" (Medicine King) and his sons to "Ri Zhao" (Sunlight) and "Yue Zhao" (Moonlight). Through their spiritual journey, the trio achieved enlightenment—the Brahman becoming the Medicine Buddha and his sons attaining the forms of Sunlight Bodhisattva and Moonlight Bodhisattva.

According to the Ritual for Arranging the Altar in the Medicine Buddha Practice (修药师仪轨布坛法), Moonlight Bodhisattva is depicted with a white body, seated on a goose throne, and holding a moon wheel. However, this image differs considerably from those traditionally passed down through the ages. All previously created images are standing figures, with Moonlight Bodhisattva standing to the right of the Medicine Buddha.

It's believed that Moonlight Bodhisattva, like Sunlight Bodhisattva, also has a close connection to the Great Compassion Mantra (Da Bei Zhou) of Avalokiteśvara Bodhisattva. For all practitioners who wholeheartedly recite the Great Compassion Mantra, Moonlight Bodhisattva, along with countless divine beings, will come to enhance the efficacy of their mantra recitation. After reciting the Great Compassion Mantra, if practitioners can further recite the Moonlight Bodhisattva Dharani, Moonlight Bodhisattva will come to offer protection, enabling the practitioner to eliminate all obstacles and illnesses, accomplish all virtuous dharmas, and stay away from various fears.

Regarding the origin of Moonlight Bodhisattva, Buddhist scriptures also suggest Moonlight Bodhisattva was a previous incarnation of Shakyamuni Buddha before he embarked on his path to enlightenment as a Bodhisattva. Another interpretation suggests that Medicine Master Buddha of the Eastern Pure Land and Sunlight and Moonlight Bodhisattvas are in a parent-child relationship.

According to tradition, the auspicious birth date of Moonlight Bodhisattva is celebrated on the 15th day of the 8th lunar month. This coincides with the Mid-Autumn Festival, a significant celebration in Han Chinese Buddhism. Therefore, on this day, devotees of Han Chinese Buddhism commemorate not only the harvest moon but also the birth of Moonlight Bodhisattva.

== Mantra ==
The mantra of Moonlight Bodhisattva goes:

"Namo Ratnasuhaaya, Arahata, Mitra Uddhaaya, Sankhadhaaraaya, Avalokitava, Jvalodhaaraaya, Kshitigarbhaaya, Sarva Sattva Hridayaya."

== See also ==
- Index of Buddhism-related articles
- Secular Buddhism
