= Index of Japan-related articles (T) =

This page lists Japan-related articles with romanized titles beginning with the letter T. For names of people, please list by surname (i.e., "Tarō Yamada" should be listed under "Y", not "T"). Please also ignore articles (e.g. "a", "an", "the") when listing articles (i.e., "A City with No People" should be listed under "City").

== Ta ==
- Tabi
- Tabuse, Yamaguchi
- Tachi
- Tachiarai, Fukuoka
- Tachibana, Fukuoka
- Tachibana, Yamaguchi
- Tachihara Michizō
- Tachikawa, Tokyo
- Tadao Ando
- Tadaoka, Osaka
- Tado, Mie
- Tadotsu, Kagawa
- Taga, Shiga
- Taga Takatada
- Tagajō, Miyagi
- Tagata District, Shizuoka
- Tagawa District, Fukuoka
- Tagawa Matsu
- Tagawa, Fukuoka
- Taguchi methods
- Tahara, Aichi
- Tahōtō
- Taihei, Fukuoka
- Taiji, Wakayama
- Taijutsu
- Taiko
- The Tale of Genji
- The Tale of Genji (manga)
- The Tales of Ise
- Taima, Nara
- Taimei, Kumamoto
- Taira clan
- Taira no Kiyomori
- Tairō
- Tairyūji
- Taisan-ji (Kamiita)
- Taisan-ji (Kobe)
- Taisan-ji (Matsuyama)
- Taisha, Shimane
- Taishi, Hyōgo
- Taishi, Osaka
- Taishō period
- Taishō, Kōchi
- Taishō Tripiṭaka
- Taito
- Taitō, Tokyo
- Taiyaki
- Taiyō o Nusunda Otoko
- Taiyū-ji
- Tajima Province
- Tajimi, Gifu
- Tajiri, Osaka
- Satoshi Tajiri
- Yoshihiro Tajiri
- Tak Matsumoto
- Taka District, Hyōgo
- Takachiho, Miyazaki
- Takahagi, Ibaraki
- Takahama, Aichi
- Takaharu, Miyazaki
- Takahashi, Okayama
- Takahashi Korekiyo
- Yuji Takahashi
- Isao Takahata
- Takaichi District, Nara
- Takaishi
- Takajo, Miyazaki
- Takamatsu, Kagawa
- Takamine Jōkichi
- Takamori, Kumamoto
- Takanabe, Miyazaki
- Takane, Gifu
- Tsugi Takano
- Takano, Hiroshima
- Takanohana Kōji
- Takaoka, Toyama
- Takaoka District, Kōchi
- Takaoka, Miyazaki
- Takaono, Kagoshima
- Takarabe, Kagoshima
- Takarazuka, Hyōgo
- Takarazuka Revue
- Takasago, Hyōgo
- Takasago International Corporation
- Takasaki, Gunma
- Takase, Kagawa
- Takashi Miike
- Takashi Yanase
- Takashima District, Shiga
- Takashima, Shiga
- Takasugi Shinsaku
- Takatori, Nara
- Takatsuki, Osaka
- Takatsuki, Shiga
- Takayama, Gifu
- Minami Takayama
- Takazaki, Miyazaki
- Takebe, Okayama
- Takeda
- Takeda Pharmaceutical Company
- Takeda Shingen
- Takeda Katsuyori
- Takefu, Fukui
- Takehara, Hiroshima
- Hiroyuki Takei
- Tōru Takemitsu
- Nobukazu Takemura
- Takenaka Corporation
- Takeno, Hyōgo
- Takeo Kanade
- Takeo, Saga
- Takeru Kobayashi
- Takeshi's Castle
- Noboru Takeshita
- Takeshita Street
- Taketa, Ōita
- Taketomi, Okinawa
- Taketoyo, Aichi
- Mariya Takeuchi
- Naoko Takeuchi
- Yūko Takeuchi
- Taki District, Mie
- Rentaro Taki
- Taki, Mie
- Taki, Shimane
- Takikawa, Hokkaidō
- Takino, Hyōgo
- Tako hiki
- Takoyaki
- Takoyaki pan
- Taku, Saga
- Takuan Sōhō
- Takuma, Kagawa
- The Tale of Genji
- The Tale of the Heike
- Tales of Phantasia
- Tama, Tokyo
- Tama-chan
- Tama Hills
- Tama New Town
- Tama River
- Tama Toshi Monorail Line
- Tamachi Station
- Tamagawa, Ehime
- Tamagawa, Yamaguchi
- Tamagotchi
- Tamagusuku, Okinawa
- Tamakeri
- Tamaki, Mie
- Nami Tamaki
- Makoto Tamamura
- Tamana District, Kumamoto
- Tamana, Kumamoto
- Tamano, Okayama
- Tamasay
- Tamayu, Shimane
- Tetsuro Tamba
- Tampopo
- Tanabata
- Tanabe, Wakayama
- Tanba Province
- Takata, Fukuoka
- Tanaka Giichi
- Tanaka Hidemitsu
- Hirokazu Tanaka
- Kakuei Tanaka
- Kinuyo Tanaka
- Makiko Tanaka
- Tanaka Memorial
- Yoshiki Tanaka
- Yōjirō Takita
- Tanba, Kyoto
- Tanbara, Ehime
- Miyuki Tanobe
- Taneda Santoka
- Tanegashima
- Taneichi, Iwate
- Tanema-ji
- Yutaka Taniyama
- Kenzo Tange
- Tango Province
- Tanigumi, Gifu
- Junichirō Tanizaki
- Tanizaki Prize
- Tanka (poetry)
- Tankan
- Tano, Kōchi
- Tano, Miyazaki
- Tanoura, Kumamoto
- Tantō
- Tantō, Hyōgo
- Tantojutsu
- Tanuma Okitsugu
- Tanushimaru, Fukuoka
- Tara, Saga
- Taragi, Kumamoto
- Tarama, Okinawa
- Tarui, Gifu
- Tarumizu, Kagoshima
- Tashiro, Kagoshima
- Masashi Tashiro
- Tatami
- Tatebayashi, Gunma
- Tatenokai
- Tateyama, Chiba
- Tatsugō, Kagoshima
- Tatsumi
- Tatsuno, Hyōgo
- Tatsuta, Aichi
- Tatsuya Uemura
- Tatsuyama, Shizuoka
- Tawaramoto, Nara

== Td ==
- TDK

== Te ==
- Tea house
- Team Rocket
- Technics (brand)
- Technos Japan Corporation
- Teichiku Records
- Teiji Takagi
- Teikei
- Teikoku Bungaku
- Teinosuke Kinugasa
- Tekken
- Temma Station
- Tempura
- Ten thousand years
- Tenchi Muyo!
- Tendai
- Tendō, Yamagata
- Tendō Station
- Tengu
- Tenkai
- Tenkawa, Nara
- Akito Tenkawa
- Tennen Rishin-ryū
- Tennin
- Tennōji-ku, Osaka
- Tenri, Nara
- Tenri-O-no-Mikoto
- Tenrikyo
- Tenseiga
- Tenshi Nanka Ja Nai
- Tenshin Shōden Katori Shintō-ryū
- Tenshinhan
- Tensoba
- Tensui, Kumamoto
- Tentacle rape
- Tentsuyu
- Teppanyaki
- Terada Torahiko
- Susumu Terajima
- Hisaichi Terauchi
- Terauchi Masatake
- Teriyaki
- Terry Bogard
- Hiroshi Teshigahara
- Tessei, Okayama
- Tetraodontidae
- Tetsugaku-dō Park
- Tetsugen Doko
- Tetsusaiga
- Tetta, Okayama
- Osamu Tezuka

== Th ==
- ThinkPad
- Thirteen Buddhas
- Thirteen Buddhas of Awaji Island
- Thirteen Buddhas of Chichibu
- Thirteen Buddhas of Hokkaido
- Thirteen Buddhas of Tama
- Throne of Blood
- Three great nobles

== To ==
- Toad (Nintendo)
- Toaplan
- Toba, Mie
- Tobal No. 1
- Tobe, Ehime
- Tobishima, Aichi
- Tochigi, Tochigi
- Tochigi Prefecture
- Tochio, Niigata
- Tōchō-ji
- Toda Kazuaki
- Toda, Saitama
- Tōdai-ji
- Tōei, Aichi
- Tofu
- Tōfuku-ji
- Togakure Ryu
- Togane, Chiba
- Tōgō Heihachirō
- Togo, Miyazaki
- Togo, Tottori
- Togouchi, Hiroshima
- Tohaku District, Tottori
- Tōhaku, Tottori
- To Heart
- Toho
- Tōhoku Main Line
- Tōhoku region
- Tōhoku Shinkansen
- Tohoku University
- Toi invasion
- Toin, Mie
- Tō-ji
- Hideki Tojo
- Tōjō, Hiroshima
- Tōjō, Hyōgo
- Tokachi Subprefecture
- Tōkai region
- Tōkaidō
- Tōkaidō Main Line
- Tōkaidō Shinkansen
- Tōkamachi, Niigata
- Tokashiki, Okinawa
- Toki, Gifu
- Toki District, Gifu
- Toki Susumu
- Tokio (band)
- Tokio Marine & Fire Insurance Co.
- Tokomaro
- Tokoname, Aichi
- Tokorozawa, Saitama
- Shusei Tokuda
- Tokugawa Hidetada
- Tokugawa Ieharu
- Tokugawa Iemitsu
- Tokugawa Iemochi
- Tokugawa Ienari
- Tokugawa Ienobu
- Tokugawa Iesada
- Tokugawa Ieshige
- Tokugawa Ietsugu
- Tokugawa Ietsuna
- Tokugawa Ieyasu
- Tokugawa Ieyoshi
- Tokugawa Mitsukuni
- Tokugawa Nariaki
- Tokugawa Tsunayoshi
- Tokugawa Yorifusa
- Tokugawa Yorinobu
- Tokugawa Yoshimune
- Tokugawa Yoshinao
- Tokugawa Yoshinobu
- Tokugawa shogunate
- Tokuji, Yamaguchi
- Tokunoshima, Kagoshima
- Tokushima Prefecture
- Tokushima, Tokushima
- Tokuso
- Tokutei Asia
- Tokyo
- Tokyo Bay
- Tokyo Broadcasting System
- Tokyo City
- Tokyo Decadence
- Tokyo Disney Resort
- Tokyo DisneySea
- Tokyo Express
- Tokyo Institute of Technology
- Tokyo International Airport
- Tokyo Kyuko Electric Railway
- Tokyo Metro
- Tokyo Metro Chiyoda Line
- Tokyo Metro Ginza Line
- Tokyo Metro Tōzai Line
- Tokyo Metropolitan Bureau of Transportation
- Tokyo Metropolitan University
- Tokyo Monorail
- Tokyo Rose
- Tokyo Shimbun
- Tokyo Shock Boys
- Tokyo Ska Paradise Orchestra
- Tokyo Station
- Tokyo Stock Exchange
- Tokyo Subway
- Tokyo Tower
- Tokyu Toyoko Line
- Tokyo Verdy 1969
- Tokyo Waterfront Area Rapid Transit
- Tokyo Yakult Swallows
- Tomakomai, Hokkaidō
- Tomari, Tottori
- Tomata District, Okayama
- Tomei Powered
- Tomi, Okayama
- Tomiai, Kumamoto
- Tomigusuku, Okinawa
- Tomigusuku Castle, Okinawa
- Tomika, Gifu
- Sin-Itiro Tomonaga
- Yoshiyuki Tomino
- Tomioka, Gunma
- Tomioka Makoto
- Tomisato, Chiba
- Isao Tomita
- Tomiyama, Aichi
- Tomochi, Kumamoto
- Hotaru Tomoe
- Tonaki, Okinawa
- Tonami, Toyama
- Tonbara, Shimane
- Tondabayashi, Osaka
- Tondemo
- Tongzhou Incident
- Tonkatsu
- Tōnō
- Tōno, Iwate
- Tonoshō, Kagawa
- Tōon, Ehime
- Topix
- Tora! Tora! Tora!
- Toray Industries
- Torahime, Shiga
- Tori Busshi
- Toride, Ibaraki
- Torii
- Torii Naritsugu
- Torii Tadaharu
- Torii Tadamasa
- Torii Tadatsune
- Torii Tadayoshi
- Akira Toriyama
- Tornado Mart
- Tosa District, Kōchi
- Tosa Province
- Tosa, Kōchi
- Tosa, Kōchi (Tosa)
- Tosashimizu, Kōchi
- Tosayama, Kōchi
- Tosayamada, Kōchi
- Toshiba
- Toshima, Kagoshima
- Toshima, Tokyo (ward)
- Toshirō Mifune
- Toshiro Tsuchida
- Tōshōdai-ji
- Tosu, Saga
- Tōtōmi Province
- Tōtōsai
- Totsukawa, Nara
- Tottori, Tottori
- Tottori Prefecture
- Tottori Sand Dunes
- Touch (manga)
- Tōkijin
- Towa, Kōchi
- Tōwa, Yamaguchi
- Towada, Aomori
- Towns of Japan
- Toyama, Toyama
- Toyama Airport
- Toyama Prefecture
- Toyo Province
- Tōyō Bunko
- Tōyo, Ehime
- Tōyō, Kumamoto
- Toyoake, Aichi
- Eiji Toyoda
- Soemu Toyoda
- Toyohama, Hiroshima
- Toyohama, Kagawa
- Toyohashi, Aichi
- Toyohashi Air Raid
- Toyohira, Hiroshima
- Toyoka, Shizuoka
- Toyokawa, Aichi
- Toyokuni Fukuma
- Toyokuni Shrine (Kanazawa)
- Toyokuni Shrine (Kyoto)
- Toyokuni Shrine (Nagoya)
- Toyokuni Susumu
- Toyomatsu, Hiroshima
- Toyonaka, Kagawa
- Toyonaka, Osaka
- Toyone, Aichi
- Toyono District, Osaka
- Toyono, Kumamoto
- Toyono, Osaka
- Toyooka, Hyōgo
- Toyooka, Shizuoka
- Toyosaka, Hiroshima
- Toyosaka, Niigata
- Toyosato, Shiga
- Toyo Straw
- Toyota
- Toyota Cavalier
- Toyota Celica
- Toyota Central R&D Labs., Inc.
- Toyota District, Hiroshima
- Toyota FTX
- Toyota Highlander
- Toyota Land Cruiser
- Toyota Prius
- Toyota Production System
- Toyota Supra
- Toyota, Aichi
- Toyota, Yamaguchi
- Toyotomi Hideyori
- Toyotomi Hideyoshi
- Toyotsu, Fukuoka
- Toyoura District, Yamaguchi
- Toyoura, Yamaguchi
- Toyoyama, Aichi
- Toyozo Arakawa
- Tōzai Line (JR West)
- Tōzai Line (Kobe)
- Tōzai Line (Kyoto)

== Tr ==
- Transport in Japan
- Tourism in Japan
- Treasure (company)
- Treasure of the Rudras
- Treaty on Basic Relations between Japan and the Republic of Korea
- Treaty of Portsmouth
- Treaty of Saint Petersburg (1875)
- Treaty of Shimonoseki
- Triforce
- Trigun
- TRON (encoding)
- TRON Project
- Tropical cyclone
- Trunks (Dragon Ball)

== Ts ==
- Tsu, Mie
- Tsu (kana)
- Tsu-11
- Tsuba
- Tsubame, Niigata
- Tsubame (Shinkansen)
- Tsubasa: Reservoir Chronicle
- Tsubouchi Shoyo
- Eiji Tsuburaya
- Tsuchiura, Ibaraki
- Tsuchiya, Masami
- Tsuchiyama, Shiga
- Yukio Tsuda
- Tsuga
- Tsugaru, Aomori
- Tsugaru Strait
- Tsuge, Nara
- Tsugu, Aichi
- Tsugunai: Atonement
- Tsuiki, Fukuoka
- Jun Tsuji
- Yuka Tsujiyoko
- Tsukahara Bokuden
- Shinya Tsukamoto
- Tsukechi, Gifu
- Tsukemono
- Tsuki wa Higashi ni Hi wa Nishi ni: Operation Sanctuary
- Tsukigase, Nara
- Tsukihime
- Tsukiji fish market
- Tsukuba, Ibaraki
- Tsukubo District, Okayama
- Tsukude, Aichi
- Tsukumi, Ōita
- Tsuma, Shimane
- Tsuna District, Hyōgo
- Tsuna, Hyōgo
- Tsunagi, Kumamoto
- Tsunami
- Ryosen Tsunashima
- Tsuno, Miyazaki
- Tsuru, Yamanashi
- Tsuruda, Kagoshima
- Tsuruga, Fukui
- Tsurugaoka Hachimangū
- Tsurugashima, Saitama
- Tsurugi (sword)
- Tsurugi (train)
- Tsurugi, Ishikawa
- Tsurugi, Tokushima
- Tsurumi, Ōita
- Marutei Tsurunen
- Tsuruoka, Yamagata
- Tsuruoka Domain
- Tsuruoka Station
- Tsushima, Aichi
- Tsushima, Ehime
- Tsushima, Nagasaki
- Tsushima Basin
- Tsushima Fuchū Domain
- Tsushima Island
- Tsushima Maru
- Tsushima Province
- Tsushima Strait
- Tsushima Subprefecture
- Tsushima Yuko
- Tsutsuga, Hiroshima
- Tsuwano, Shimane
- Tsuyama, Okayama
- Tsuyazaki, Fukuoka
- Tsuzuki District, Kyoto
- Tsuzuki-ku, Yokohama

== Tu ==
- Turn A Gundam

== Tv ==
- TV Asahi
- TV Osaka
- TV Tokyo

== Tw ==
- Twenty-One Demands

== Ty ==
- Type 93 torpedo
