= Eric Ghysels =

Belgian economist (born 1956)

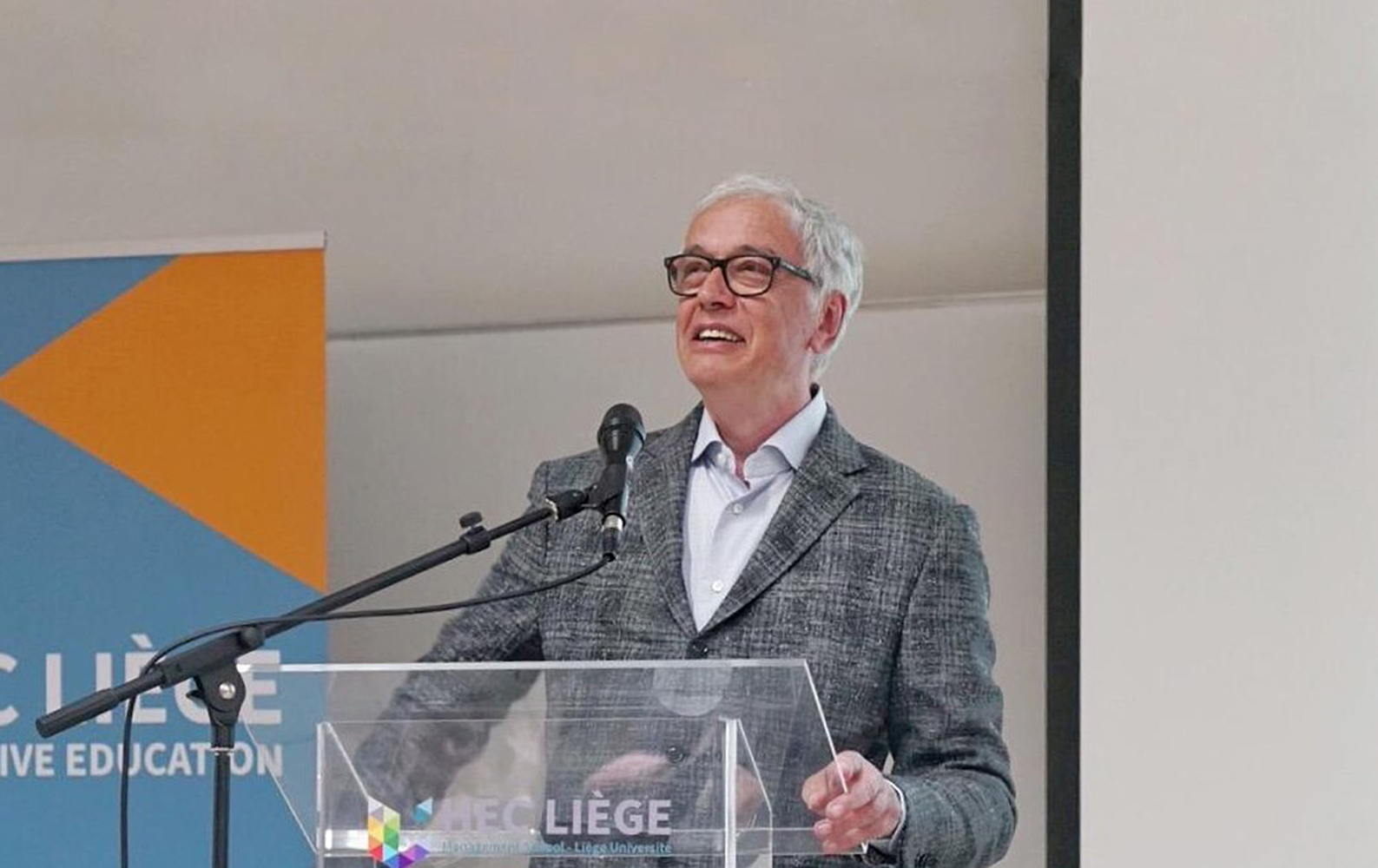
- Born: 1956 (age 69–70); Brussels, Belgium
- Spouse: Marianna Matinyan
- Children: 2

Academic background
- Education: Vrije Universiteit Brussel; Northwestern University
- Influences: Robert Engle; Clive W. J. Granger; Lars Peter Hansen; Thomas J. Sargent; Christopher Sims; Halbert White

Academic work
- Discipline: Finance; Financial econometrics Machine Learning; Econometrics; Fintech
- Institutions: University of North Carolina at Chapel Hill
- Notable ideas: Mixed-data sampling (MIDAS); Seasonality
- Awards: Doctor Honoris Causa; HEC, University of Liège
- Website: eghysels.web.unc.edu

Eric Ghysels (born 1956 in Brussels) is a Belgian economist with interest in finance and time series econometrics, and in particular the fields of financial econometrics and financial technology. He is the Edward M. Bernstein Distinguished Professor of Economics at the University of North Carolina and a Professor of Finance at the Kenan-Flagler Business School. He is also the Faculty Research Director of the Rethinc.Labs at the Frank Hawkins Kenan Institute of Private Enterprise.

== Early life and education ==
Ghysels was born in Brussels, Belgium, as the son of Pierre Ghysels (a civil servant) and Anna Janssens (a homemaker). He completed his undergraduate studies in economics (Supra Cum Laude) at the Vrije Universiteit Brussel in 1979. He obtained a Fulbright Fellowship from the Belgian American Educational Foundation in 1980 and started graduate studies at Northwestern University that year, finishing his PhD at the Kellogg Graduate School of Management of Northwestern University in 1984. In 2019 he was awarded an honorary doctorate (Doctor Honoris Causa) by HEC University of Liège.

== Career ==
After graduation from the Kellogg School of Management at Northwestern University he took a faculty position at the Université de Montréal in the Department of Economics. In 1996 he became a Professor of Economics at Penn State University and joined the University of North Carolina at Chapel Hill in 2000. He is currently the Edward M. Bernstein Distinguished Professor of Economics at UNC Chapel Hill and a Professor of Finance and the Kenan-Flagler Business School. Since 2018 he is the Faculty Research Director, Rethinc.Labs, at the Kenan Institute for Private Enterprise at UNC Chapel Hill. Since 2020 he is also affiliated with the Department of Electrical and Computer Engineering at the North Carolina State University.

Ghysels is a fellow of the American Statistical Association and co-founded with Robert Engle the Society for Financial Econometrics (SoFiE). He was editor of the Journal of Business and Economic Statistics (with Alastair R. Hall, 2001–2004) editor of the Journal of Financial Econometrics (2012–2015). He is currently co-editor of the Journal of Applied Econometrics.

In 2008–2009 Ghysels was resident scholar at the Federal Reserve Bank of New York, in 2011 Duisenberg Fellow at the European Central Bank, both at the height of the Great Recession, and has since been a regular visitor of several other central banks around the world.

He has also been visiting professor at Bocconi University (Tommaso Padoa-Schioppa Visiting Professor, 2017), the Stevanovich Center at the University of Chicago (2015), Cambridge University (INET Visiting Professor, 2014), New York University Stern School of Business (2007), among others, and holds a courtesy appointment at Louvain Finance, Université catholique de Louvain.

== Books ==
In 2001, he published a monograph on The Econometric Analysis of Seasonal Time Series together with Denise R. Osborn. In 2018, he published a textbook entitled Applied Economic Forecasting using Time Series Methods together with Massimiliano Marcellino.

== Honors and awards ==
His honors and awards include:

- 1980: Fulbright Fellow, Belgian American Educational Foundation
- 1981: Research Fellow, National Science Foundation of Belgium
- 1985: ASA/NSF/Census Fellow, American Statistical Association
- 1999: Chair, Business and Economic Statistics Section, American Statistical Association
- 2001: Who's Who in Economics, Fourth Edition
- 2008: Resident Scholar, Federal Reserve Bank of New York
- 2011: Fernand Braudel Senior Fellow, European University Institute, Florence, Italy
- 2011: Wim Duisenberg Fellow, European Central Bank
- 2012: SoFiE Fellow
- 2017: Inaugural Emil Gumbel Lecture, Heidelberg University
- 2020: CORE Lecture Series, UC Louvain
- 2020: Fellow, International Association Applied Econometrics

== Research ==
Ghysels' most recent research focuses on Mixed data sampling (MIDAS) regression models and filtering methods with applications in finance and other fields. He has also worked on diverse topics such as seasonality in economic times series, machine learning and AI applications in finance, quantum computing applications in finance, among many other topics.

Mixed data sampling or MIDAS regressions are econometric regression models can be viewed in some cases as substitutes for the Kalman filter when applied in the context of mixed frequency data. There is now a substantial literature on MIDAS regressions and their applications, including Ghysels, Santa-Clara and Valkanov (2006), Ghysels, Sinko and Valkanov, Andreou, Ghysels and Kourtellos (2010) and Andreou, Ghysels and Kourtellos (2013).

A MIDAS regression is a direct forecasting tool which can relate future low-frequency data with current and lagged high-frequency indicators, and yield different forecasting models for each forecast horizon. It can flexibly deal with data sampled at different frequencies and provide a direct forecast of the low-frequency variable. It incorporates each individual high-frequency data in the regression, which solves the problems of losing potentially useful information and including mis-specification.

A simple regression example has the independent variable appearing at a higher frequency than the dependent variable:

$$y_t = \beta_0 + \beta_1 B(L^{1/m};\theta)x_t^{(m)} + \varepsilon_t^{(m)},$$

where y is the dependent variable, x is the regressor, m denotes the frequency – for instance if y is yearly $x_t^{(4)}$ is quarterly – $\varepsilon$ is the disturbance and $B(L^{1/m};\theta)$ is a lag distribution, for instance the Beta function or the Almon Lag.

The regression models can be viewed in some cases as substitutes for the Kalman filter when applied in the context of mixed frequency data. Bai, Ghysels and Wright (2013) examine the relationship between MIDAS regressions and Kalman filter state space models applied to mixed frequency data. In general, the latter involves a system of equations, whereas, in contrast, MIDAS regressions involve a (reduced form) single equation. As a consequence, MIDAS regressions might be less efficient, but also less prone to specification errors. In cases where the MIDAS regression is only an approximation, the approximation errors tend to be small.

The MIDAS can also be used for machine learning time series and panel data nowcasting. The machine learning MIDAS regressions involve Legendre polynomials. High-dimensional mixed frequency time series regressions involve certain data structures that once taken into account should improve the performance of unrestricted estimators in small samples. These structures are represented by groups covering lagged dependent variables and groups of lags for a single (high-frequency) covariate. To that end, the machine learning MIDAS approach exploits the sparse-group LASSO (sg-LASSO) regularization that accommodates conveniently such structures. The attractive feature of the sg-LASSO estimator is that it allows us to combine effectively the approximately sparse and dense signals.

Several software packages feature MIDAS regressions and related econometric methods. These include:

- MIDAS Matlab Toolbox
- midasr, R package
- midasml, R package for High-Dimensional Mixed Frequency Time Series Data
- EViews
- Python
- Julia
