= Purchasing Managers' Index =

Economic indicator

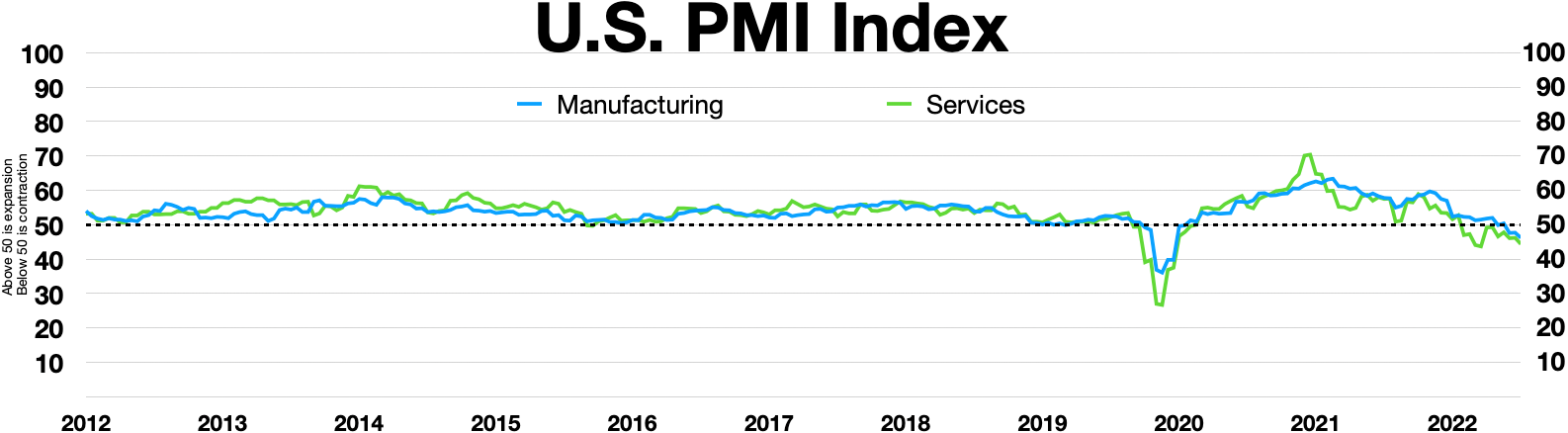
U.S. PMI Index 2012 - 2022 Manufacturing Above 50 is expansion, below 50 is contraction Services

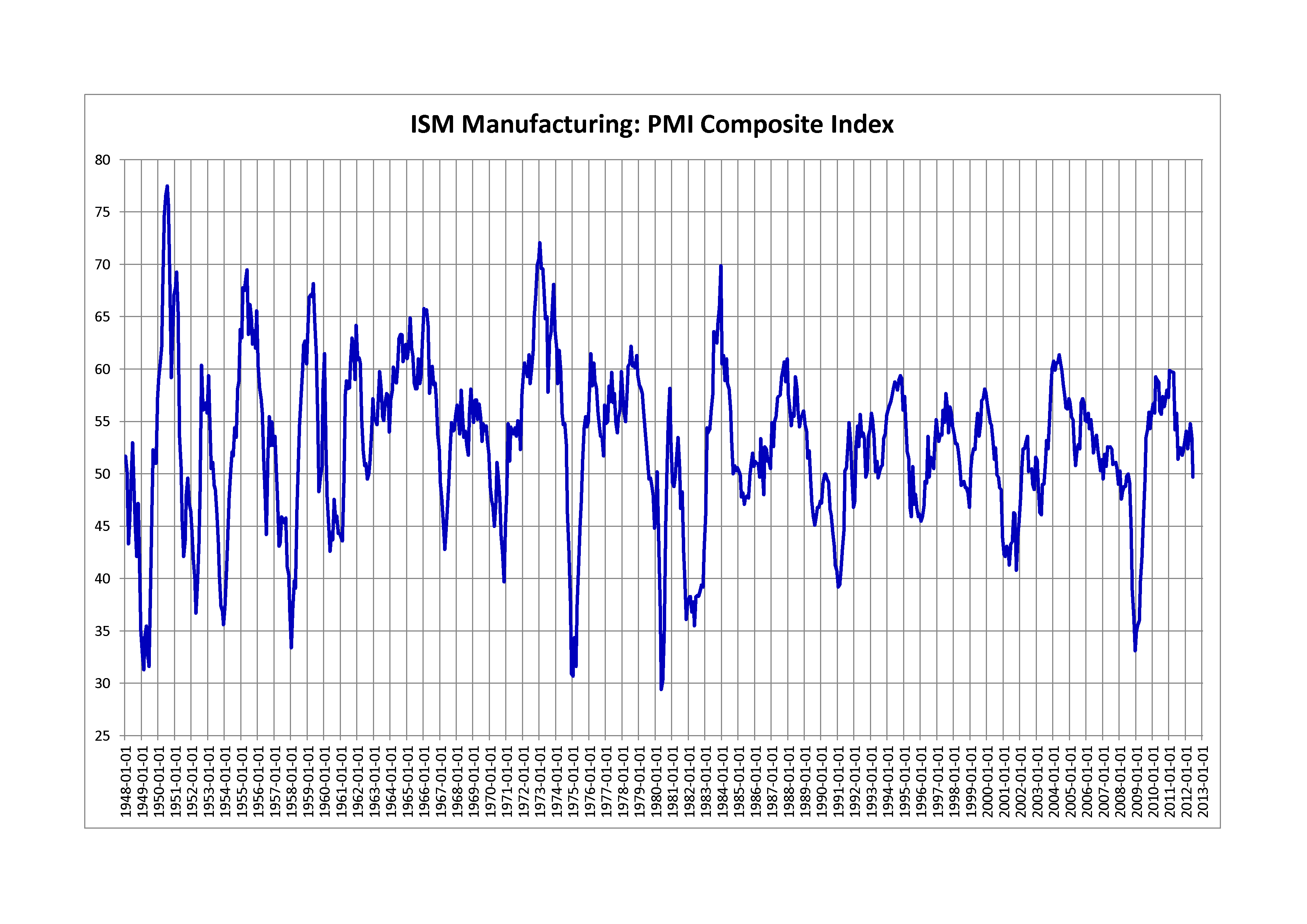
ISM's Purchasing Managers Index 1948–2012

US manufacturing PMI since 2025.

Purchasing managers' indexes (PMI) are economic indicators derived from monthly surveys of private sector companies.

The three principal producers of PMIs are S&P Global (from 2022 merger with IHS Markit), which produces PMIs for over 30 countries worldwide and developed the first service sector PMIs, and the Institute for Supply Management (ISM), which originated the manufacturing surveys produced for the United States. Other producers include the Singapore Institute of Purchasing and Materials Management (SIPMM), which produces the Singapore PMI, Swedbank in Sweden, NBS in mainland China, and Credit Suisse in Switzerland.

An official global PMI is produced by S&P Global in association with JPMorgan, the ISM and IFPSM, which also includes detailed sector survey results. Regional headline indicators and detailed sector data are also compiled by S&P Global.

The purchasing managers' index (PMI) surveys are compiled on a monthly basis by polling businesses which represent the makeup of the respective business sector. S&P Global surveys cover manufacturing, services and in some cases also construction, while ISM's surveys cover all NAICS categories. SIPMM survey covers just the manufacturing sector.

The surveys are released shortly after the end of the reference period. The actual release dates depend on the sector covered by the survey. Manufacturing data are generally released on the first business day of the month, non-manufacturing/services on the third business day, and construction on the fourth business day.

The purchasing managers surveys include additional sub indices for manufacturing surveys such as new orders, employment, exports, stocks of raw materials and finished goods, prices of inputs and finished goods.

Purchasing managers' index (PMI) data are widely used often due to their ability to give a reliable indicator of key economic variables such as gross domestic product (GDP) and consumer price inflation (CPI). Other benefits include the data's timeliness due to it being released shortly after the end of the reference period, and the data is not revised after publication.

== Formula, calculation, and reading ==
PMI data are presented in the form of a diffusion index, which is calculated as follows

$$\mbox{PMI} = P_1 + P_2 \div 2$$

where:

- P_{1} = Percentage number of answers that reported an improvement.
- P_{2} = Percentage number of answers that reported no change.
- P_{3} = Percentage number of answers that reported a deterioration.

Because of P_{1} + P_{2} + P_{3} = 100,

$$\mbox{PMI} = (P_1 - P_3) \div 2 + 50$$

Thus, if 100% of the panel reported an improvement, the index would be 100.0. If 100% reported a deterioration, the index would be zero. If 100% of the panel saw no change, the index would be 50.0 (P_{2} * 0.5).

Therefore, an index reading of 50.0 means that the variable is unchanged, a number over 50.0 indicates an improvement, while anything below 50.0 suggests a decline. An index of 50.0 would arise if either all respondents reported no change or the number of respondents reporting an improvement was matched by the number of respondents reporting a deterioration. The further away from 50.0 the index is, the stronger the change over the month, e.g. a reading of 55.0 points to a more frequently reported increase in a variable than a reading of 52.5. The degree of confidence experienced by respondents reporting an improvement and the degree of concern experienced by respondents reporting a deterioration are not factored into the index.

== Headline Manufacturing PMI ==
The headline manufacturing PMI is a composite of five of the survey indices. These are New orders, Output, Employment, Suppliers' delivery times (inverted) and Stocks of purchases. The ISM attributes each of these variables the same weighting when calculating the overall PMI, whereas S&P Global uses the following weights: production (0.25), new orders (0.30), employment (0.20), supplier deliveries (0.15), and inventories (0.10).

Services PMIs do not have a composite index and instead use the Business activity index as its headline index. This is directly comparable with the Output Index in manufacturing PMI surveys rather than the composite PMI.

== S&P Global PMI surveys ==
The data for the index are collected through a survey of purchasing managers in the manufacturing sector on five different fields, namely, new orders from customers, speed of supplier deliveries, inventories, order backlogs and employment level. Respondents can report either better, same or worse business conditions than previous months. For all these fields the percentage of respondents that reported better conditions than the previous months is calculated. The five percentages are multiplied by a weighting factor (the factors adding to 1) and are added.

=== Survey panels ===
Purchasing managers form a near ideal survey sample base, having access to information often denied to many other managers. Due to the nature of their job function, it is important that purchasing managers are among the first to know when trading conditions, and therefore company performance, change for the better or worse. S&P Global therefore uses such executives to produce data on business conditions.

In each country, a panel of purchasing managers is carefully selected by S&P Global, designed to accurately represent the true structure of the chosen sector of the economy as determined by official data. Generally, value added data are used at two-digit SIC level, with a further breakdown by company size analysis where possible. The survey panels therefore replicate the actual economy in miniature. A weighting system is also incorporated into the survey database that weights each response by company size and the relative importance of the sector in which that company operates.

Particular effort is made to achieve monthly survey response rates of around 80%, ensuring that an accurate picture of business conditions is recorded over time.

Data are collected in the second half of each month via mail, email, web, fax and phone.

=== Questionnaires ===
A key feature of the PMI surveys is that they ask only for factual information. They are not surveys of opinions, intentions or expectations and the data therefore represent the closest one can get to “hard data” without asking for actual figures from companies.

Questions asked relate to key variables such as output, new orders, prices and employment. Questions take the form of up/down/same replies. For example, “Is your company’s output higher, the same or lower than one month ago?”

Respondents are asked to take expected seasonal influences into account when considering their replies.

For each main survey question, respondents are asked to provide a reason for any change on the previous month, if known. This assists not only the understanding of variable movement but also in the seasonal process when X12 cannot be used.

=== Seasonal adjustment ===
The seasonal adjustment of PMI survey data is usually calculated using a combination of the X12 statistical programme of adjustment, as used by governmental statistical bodies in many developed countries, and alternative methods such as using the frequency of mentions by responding survey panel member companies for changes in variables where that mention is considered indicative of a seasonal variation.

== Other PMI surveys ==
In addition to the RatingDog PMI published by S&P Global for mainland China, the National Bureau of Statistics also compiles PMI data for mainland China. The Swedish PMI is run by private bank Swedbank.

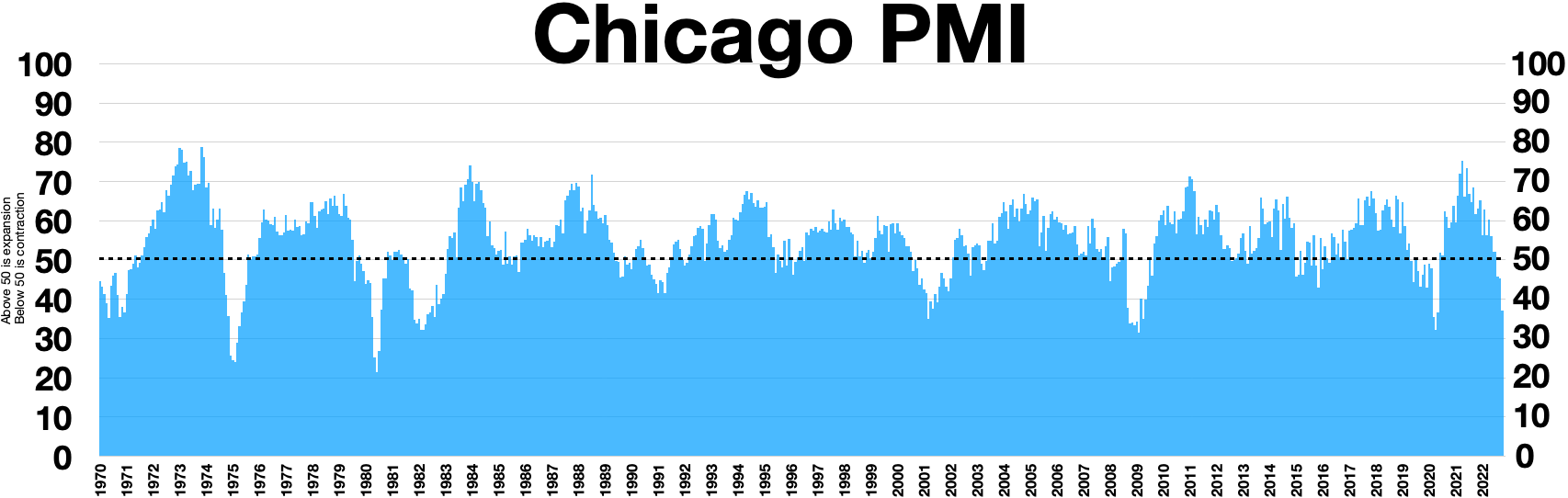
Chicago PMI 1970 - 2022

The Chicago PMI survey, owned by Deutsche Börse, registers manufacturing and non-manufacturing activity in the Chicago Region. Investors value this indicator because the Chicago region somewhat mirrors the United States overall in its distribution of manufacturing and non-manufacturing activity.

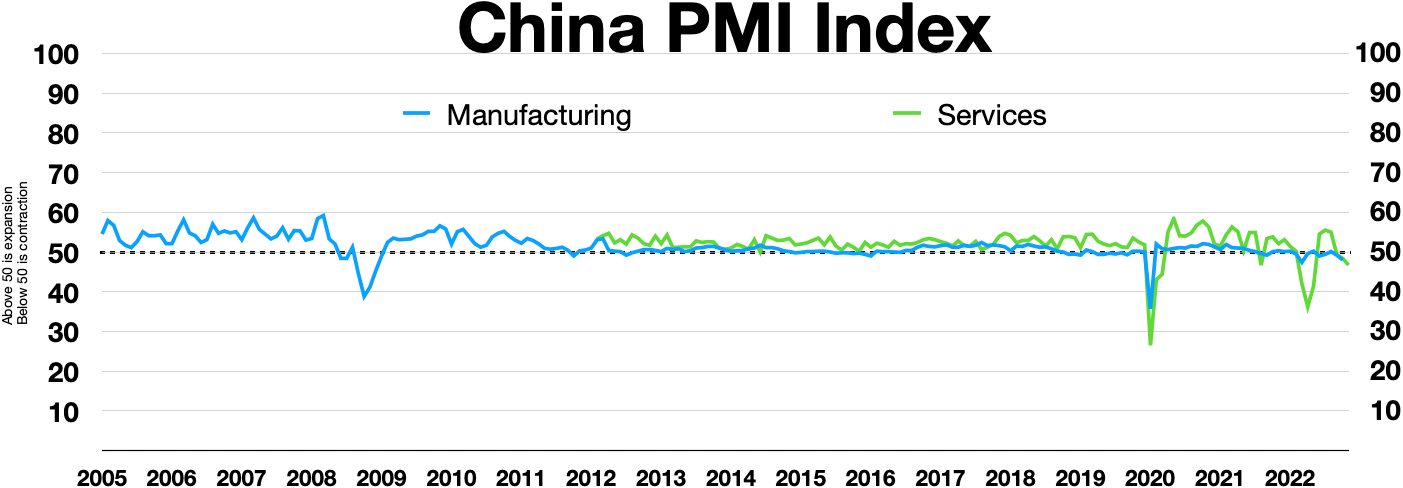
China PMI Index Manufacturing Above 50 is expansion, below 50 is contraction Services

In 2002, SIPMM assisted China Federation of Logistics and Purchasing (CFLP) to produce the China PMI.

SIPMM has produced a monthly bulletin since 1998 for the Singapore manufacturing sectors, with a focus on the electronics manufacturing sector. The data are released on the second business day of each month. The Singapore PMI (新加坡采购经理指数) is published by Singapore Institute of Purchasing and Materials Management. It was developed by Professor Philip Poh. He has also contributed to the development of the Chinese PMI.

Similar surveys are published by the Ifo Institute for Economic Research in Germany, the Bank of Japan in Japan (Tankan). The PRIX index uses a diffusion index methodology based on that of PMIs. However, rather than drawing on purchasing managers, it uses country analysts based in the world's 20 largest oil exporting countries to forecast political events that may affect global oil exports. The PRIX index is updated quarterly.

== See also ==
- Ivey Index
