= 一博 =

一博, meaning 'one, command', may refer to:

- Kazuhiro, a masculine Japanese given name
- Yibo (disambiguation)#People, a masculine Chinese given name

== See also ==
- 博一 (disambiguation)
