= Aruoba-Diebold-Scotti Index =

Business cycle indicator

The Aruoba-Diebold-Scotti Business Conditions Index ("ADS Index" ) is a coincident business cycle indicator used in macroeconomics in the United States. The index measures business activity, which may be correlated with periods of expansion and contraction in the economy. The primary and novel function of the ADS index stems from its use of high-frequency economic data and subsequent high-frequency updating, opposed to the traditionally highly-lagged and infrequently-published macroeconomic data such as GDP.

== Development ==
The ADS index was first introduced by the authors, including Francis Diebold, in March 2007 and published in October 2008, but the index is retroactively calculated back to March 1960.

While other economic nowcasting often estimates GDP or inflation, the ADS index exists as a stand-alone series. This is in part due to the business cycle not tied to a single variable, such as GDP, employment, or industrial production. Instead, business cycle theory suggests an underlying factor that moves each of these series. The ADS index estimates that unobserved factor.

The index itself is the principal factor produced by a dynamic factor model. As standard for such models, it is cast in state space and estimated using maximum likelihood estimation methods. A Kalman filter handles the missing data that arises from using a mix of frequencies of input data. For example, a daily series such as term premium sets the entire model to be daily. Unemployment data is collected monthly, though, so all days between releases are treated as missing data.

The factor deals with the de-meaned growth rate of business activity, such that it is (a) centered on 0, and (b) measures deviation from average growth. Thus, an ADS score of 0 indicates completely average growth, positive values indicate greater than average, and negative less than average.

== Data ==
The ADS initially used just four input series to estimate the unobserved factor: GDP, Employment, Initial Claims, and Slope (of daily term structure). However, removing this last term yielded no loss in model accuracy. This demonstrates that more is not always better. The weekly initial claims in unemployment was helpful, though.

Currently, the ADS relies on the following data:

- Initial jobless claims (weekly)
- Payroll employment (monthly)
- Industrial production (monthly)
- Real personal income, less transfer payments (monthly)
- Real manufacturing and trade sales (monthly)
- Real GDP (monthly)

== Usage ==
The ADS is currently maintained by the Federal Reserve Bank of Philadelphia, where it is made publicly available. The index updates with the release of new data upon which it relies, usually eight times a month.

The index does not predict an economic recession. Rather than leading the business cycle, it coincides. While it may have limited use in high-frequency finance, it serves a purpose in aiding monetary and fiscal policy by providing a quantitative measure of the current state of the economy.
