= Tankan =

- Tankan (Japan)
- Tankan (Peru)
- Tanka, ethnic group of China, sometimes referred to as the Tankans in English
