= Macroeconomic indicators =

Macroeconomic indicators are aggregated statistics for a geography, population, or political jurisdiction gathered by agencies and bureaus of various government statistical organization, and sometimes by private organizations using similar techniques.

== List of macroeconomic indicators ==
- Aggregate demand
- Aggregate supply
- External debt indicators
- GDP deflator
- Green gross domestic product
- Gross domestic product
- Gross national product
- Gross National Happiness
- Jobless claims
- Monetary conditions index
- Net foreign assets
- Nominal GDP
- Nonfarm payrolls
- Real gross domestic product
- Social Progress Index

== See also ==
- Category:Macroeconomic indicators
- Economic indicators
