= Philip Poh =

Professor who developed the Singapore Purchasing Managers Index (PMI) in 1998

- Born: Singapore
- Education: Southern Cross University
- Occupations: Chairman of Singapore Institute of Purchasing and Materials Management; Chairman of the World Certification Institute; Vice-Chairman of World Supply Research Institute
- Years active: Present
- Spouse: Married
- Children: 3
- Website: Professor Philip Poh

Philip Poh is a professor that developed the Singapore Purchasing Managers Index (PMI) in 1998. After a successful pilot survey, the Singapore PMI was launched in January 1999 and the index has become a barometer of the Singapore manufacturing economy. In 2002, government officials in China sought the advice of Professor Poh to develop the China PMI. Since then, the China PMI has also become an indicator of the global manufacturing economy.

Professor Poh is currently a chairman of the Singapore Institute of Purchasing and Materials Management (SIPMM), World Certification Institute, as well as the Vice-Chairman of World Supply Research Institute. Since 1998, he has been the adjunct professor specialising in purchasing and logistics management at Southern Cross University in Australia. He has also worked in adjunct capacity at several universities in Europe, United States, and Australia. In 2004, Professor Poh received the Garner-Themoin Award from the International Federation of Purchasing and Supply Management, a world body registered in Switzerland. Jack Wagner, the Director-General of the World Body was quoted as saying that

the contributions made by Professor Philip Poh to the profession are well recognised not only in the Asia Pacific region but also globally, in over 40 countries where the world body is represented.

Previous award recipients include Cabinet Ministers and a former President of the World Bank.
