= Francis X. Diebold =

American economist (born 1959)

- Born: November 12, 1959 (age 66); Philadelphia, PA, US

Academic background
- Education: University of Pennsylvania (B.S., Ph.D.)
- Doctoral advisors: Marc Nerlove (Chair), Lawrence Klein, Peter Pauly

Academic work
- Discipline: Econometrics; Financial economics Macroeconomics
- Institutions: University of Pennsylvania; NBER
- Notable ideas: Diebold–Mariano test; Latent-factor ARCH model; Realized volatility modeling and forecasting; Dynamic Nelson–Siegel yield-curve model; Network connectedness measurement and visualization; Aruoba–Diebold–Scotti Index
- Awards: Guggenheim Fellowship; Sloan Fellowship; Humboldt Fellowship
- Website: https://www.sas.upenn.edu/~fdiebold/

Francis X. Diebold (born November 12, 1959) is an American economist known for his pioneering work in dynamic predictive econometric modeling, with emphasis on financial asset markets, macroeconomic fundamentals, and the interface. He has made well-known contributions to the measurement and modeling of asset-return volatility, business cycles, yield curves, and network connectedness, and his most recent work begins to integrate aspects of climate change. He has published more than 150 scientific papers and 8 books, and he is regularly ranked among globally most-cited economists.

== Education and Career ==
Diebold earned both his B.S. and Ph.D. degrees at the University of Pennsylvania, where his doctoral committee included Marc Nerlove, Lawrence Klein, and Peter Pauly. He has spent most of his career at Penn, where he has mentored approximately 75 Ph.D. students. Presently he is Paul F. and Warren S. Miller Professor of Social Sciences, Professor of Economics, Professor of Statistics and Data Science, and Professor of Finance. He is also a Faculty Research Associate at the National Bureau of Economic Research in Cambridge, Massachusetts. He has held visiting professorships at Princeton University, University of Chicago, Johns Hopkins University, and New York University.

== Honors ==
Diebold is an elected Fellow of the Econometric Society and the American Statistical Association, and the recipient of Sloan, Guggenheim, and Humboldt fellowships. He has served on the editorial boards of Econometrica, Review of Economics and Statistics, and International Economic Review. He was President of the Society for Financial Econometrics (2011–2013) and Chairman of the Federal Reserve System's inaugural Model Validation Council (2012–2013).

== Scientific contributions ==
In predictive econometric modeling Diebold is best known for the "Diebold–Mariano test" for comparing point forecast accuracy, methods for assessing density forecast conditional calibration, and for his text, Elements of Forecasting.

In financial econometrics Diebold is best known for his contributions in financial asset return volatility modeling, especially the Andersen-Bollerslev-Diebold analyses of "realized volatility" extracted from high-frequency asset returns, for the Diebold–Li "dynamic Nelson-Siegel" yield-curve model and its extensions, and for the Diebold-Nerlove latent-factor ARCH model.

In macroeconometrics Diebold is best known for his work on the macro-finance interface, for his work empirically integrating linear dynamic factor modeling with nonlinear regime switching, and for his work on real-time macroeconomic monitoring, particularly the Aruoba–Diebold–Scotti ("ADS") Business Conditions Index, now maintained by the Federal Reserve Bank of Philadelphia.

In network analysis, Diebold is best known for the Diebold–Yilmaz framework for dynamic network connectedness measurement and visualization.
