= List of countries by oil exports =

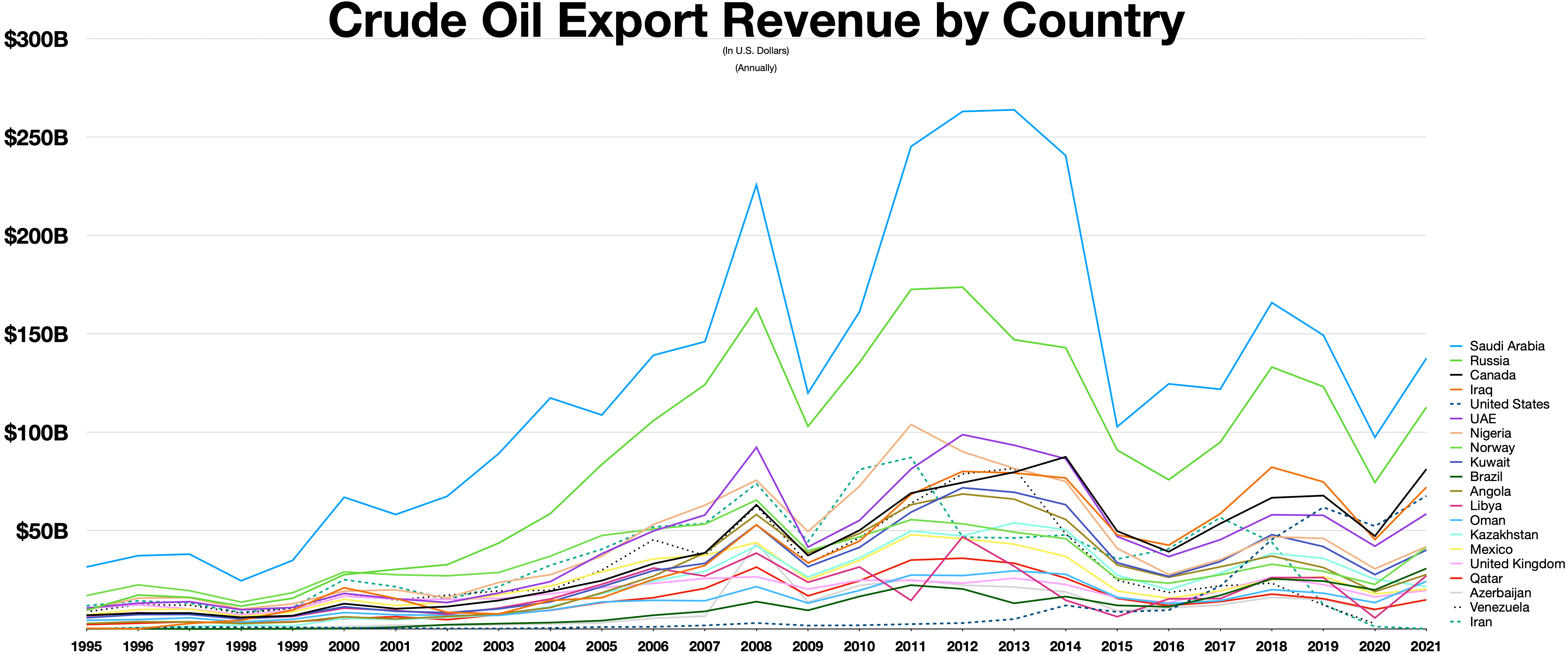
Crude oil export revenue by country (annually)

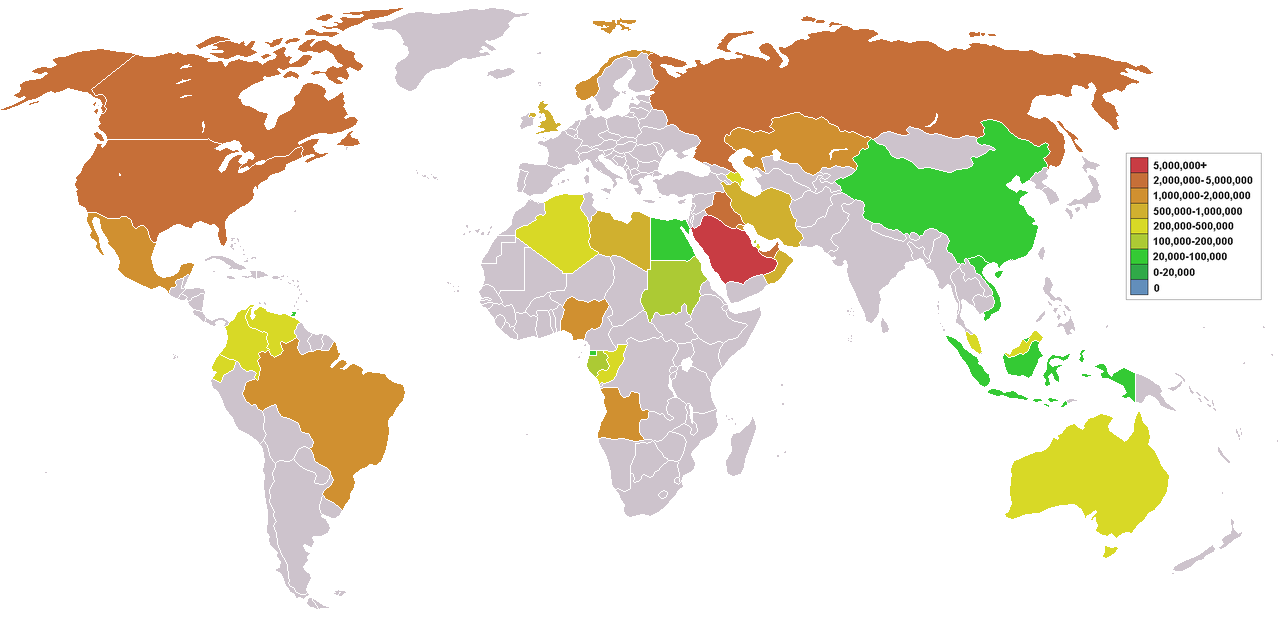
A world map of countries by oil exportation, 2022

This is a list of countries by oil exports based on data for 2024 by CEIC. Oil in this list refers to base crude oil only, not refined petroleum products such as gasoline, diesel and airplane fuel.

In 2024, Saudi Arabia was the largest exporter of petroleum, followed by Russia and Iraq. Other major exporters of petroleum in that year included the United States, Canada and United Arab Emirates. In 2024, Saudi Arabia also had the largest oil export value in US dollar terms by far.

Many of these countries also import oil, and some import more oil than they export. This is known as an oil export deficit. By contrast, when a country exports more oil than it imports, it is known as an oil export surplus. The second table in this page shows which countries have the largest oil export surplus in US dollar terms. Russia was the world leader in 2024 for this category.

== List ==
Country	Export value 2024 (thousands US$)	Oil exports 2024 (bbl/day)
Saudi Arabia (OPEC)	191,068,167	6,049,140
Russia (OPEC+)	122,487,872	4,524,354
United States	118,499,361	4,109,000
United Arab Emirates	114,863,828	2,717,000
Canada	107,499,738	3,568,933
Iraq (OPEC)	98,371,466	3,363,570
Norway	49,735,668	1,690,710
Brazil (OPEC+)	44,964,285	1,706,667
Kazakhstan (OPEC+)	42,878,761	1,425,750
Iran (OPEC)	41,230,000	1,566,220
Nigeria (OPEC)	38,404,923	1,522,297
Kuwait (OPEC)	35,530,010	1,175,833
Angola	31,257,304	1,042,071
Libya (OPEC)	27,290,645	1,001,882
Oman (OPEC+)	25,768,830	887,083
Mexico (OPEC+)	21,707,462	847,812
Guyana	18,174,888	–
Netherlands	17,039,661	–
United Kingdom	16,014,249	475,043
Qatar	14,965,909	540,842
Azerbaijan (OPEC+)	14,437,356	393,917
Algeria (OPEC)	13,976,238	459,492
Colombia	12,062,243	473,250
Venezuela (OPEC)	9,845,186	655,743
Ecuador	8,646,543	356,000
Australia	7,105,138	238,558
Malaysia (OPEC+)	6,249,794	218,167
Congo (OPEC)	5,432,045	236,488
Gabon (OPEC)	5,226,724	204,360
Argentina	4,930,467	–
Ghana	3,735,368	–
Chad	3,206,621	–
Cameroon	2,697,654	–
Equatorial Guinea (OPEC)	2,269,466	56,436
Indonesia	2,228,458	67,167
Brunei (OPEC+)	2,100,528	75,289
Spain	1,884,604	–
Trinidad and Tobago	1,616,072	51,250
Vietnam	1,480,375	50,333
Egypt	1,408,882	37,667
China	1,181,828	41,668
Belgium	957,088	–
Ivory Coast	799,801	–
Croatia	773,594	–
Senegal	763,878	–
Niger	748,937	–
Papua New Guinea	736,202	–
Sudan (OPEC+)	697,077	84,660
Italy	632,755	–
DR Congo	601,325	–
Thailand	583,036	–
New Zealand	423,291	–
Denmark	396,231	–
South Sudan	388,115	–
Tunisia	380,559	–
Mongolia	322,111	–
Peru	317,738	–
Turkmenistan	240,117	–
Philippines	168,275	–
Poland	101,267	–
Mozambique	95,515	–
Pakistan	67,637	–
Guatemala	66,671	–
Timor-Leste	66,095	–
Hungary	63,144	–
Liberia	52,092	–
South Africa	51,468	–
Greece	42,743	–
France	16,100	–
British Virgin Islands	15,097	–
Barbados	13,633	–
Chile	10,113	–
Romania	7,529	–
Sao Tome and Principe	6,313	–
Bosnia and Herzegovina	4,664	–
Tanzania	2,352	–
Singapore	2,160	–
Bolivia	1,419	–
Germany	1,172	–
Latvia	710	–
Slovakia	694	–
Moldova	628	–
Sweden	191	–
Ireland	74	–
Fiji	70	–
Namibia	22	–
Czech Republic	12	–
Kenya	5	–
Sri Lanka	3	–
Dominican Republic	3	–
Jamaica	2	–
Switzerland	2	–
Gambia	1	–
Botswana	1	–
Uganda	1	–
Bahrain (OPEC+)	–	137,750

== Oil export revenues ==
Academic contributors have written about differences in petroleum revenue management in various countries. Many scholars see the natural resource wealth in some countries as a blessing, while others have referred to it as a natural resource curse. A vast body of resource curse literature has studied the role of governance regimes, legal frameworks and political risk in building an economy based on natural resource exploitation. However, whether it is seen as a blessing or a curse, the recent political decisions regarding the future of petroleum production in many countries were given an extractivist direction, thus also granting a status quo to the exploitation of natural resources. The PRIX index forecasts the effect of political developments on exports from major petroleum-producing countries.

== By oil export surplus ==
A country's oil export surplus can be calculated by subtracting the value of its oil imports from the value of its oil exports. Countries with oil export surpluses tend to be more energy independent than those with oil export deficits (importing more oil than they export).

Country	Continent	Oil export surplus 2022 (US$ billions)
Russia	Europe/Asia	+ 346.7
Saudi Arabia (OPEC)	Asia	+ 265.1
Norway	Europe	+ 203.1
United Arab Emirates (OPEC)	Asia	+ 167.8
Canada	North America	+ 135.0
Australia	Oceania	+ 113.2
Qatar	Asia	+ 94.9
Iraq (OPEC)	Asia	+ 87.3
Kuwait (OPEC)	Asia	+ 69.6
Algeria (OPEC)	Africa	+ 57.7
United States	North America	+ 55.9
Oman	Asia	+ 52.8
Angola	Africa	+ 43.4
Kazakhstan	Asia/Europe	+ 42.8
Azerbaijan	Asia/Europe	+ 34.0

== See also ==
- List of countries by oil production
- List of countries by exports
- List of countries by net oil exports
- List of countries by proven oil reserves
- History of the Venezuelan oil industry
- Petrodollar recycling
- World energy resources
- Energy development
