= 博一 =

博一, meaning 'command, one', may refer to:

- Feng Boyi (born 1960), a Chinese art critic
- Hirokazu, a masculine Japanese given name
- Hiroshi, a masculine Japanese given name

== See also ==
- Boyi (disambiguation)
- 一博 (disambiguation)
