= 博義 =

博義, meaning 'wide, righteousness', may refer to:

- Boyi, a Chinese given name of chairperson of Hong Kong Bar Association Paul Harris
- Hiroyoshi, a masculine Japanese given name

== See also ==
- Boyi (disambiguation)
