= Suō-Ōshima =

Suō-Ōshima 周防大島町
- Town
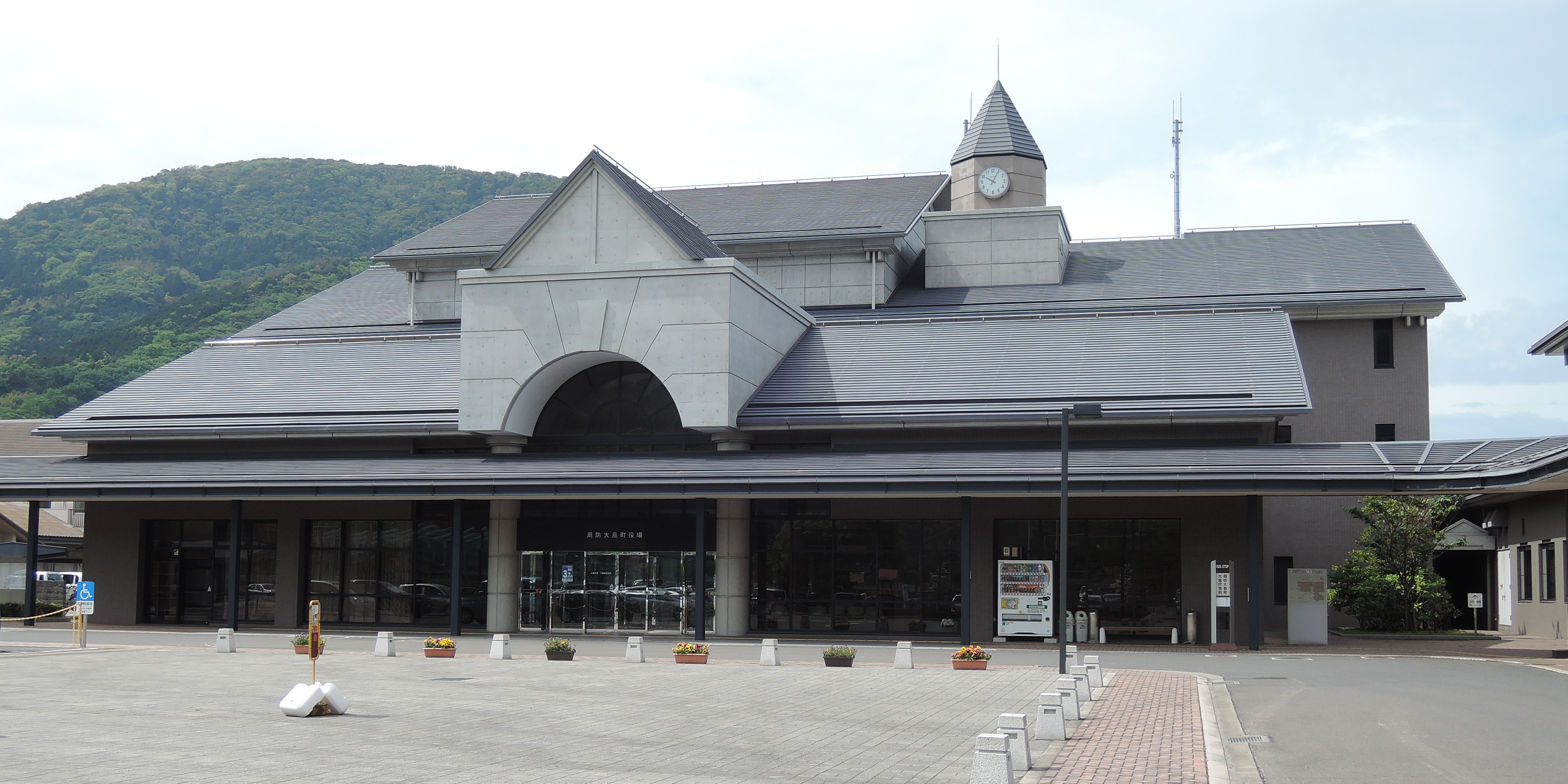
- Suō-Ōshima town hall

- Flag Seal

- Location of Suō-Ōshima in Yamaguchi Prefecture

- Location in Japan
- Coordinates: 33°55′N 132°14′E
- Country: Japan
- Region: Chūgoku; San'yō
- Prefecture: Yamaguchi Prefecture
- District: Ōshima

Government
  - Mayor: Takumi Shiiki

Area
  - Total: 138.17 km^{2} (53.35 sq mi)

Population (May 2024)
  - Total: 13,774
  - Density: 99/km^{2} (260/sq mi)
- Time zone: UTC+09:00 (JST)
- City hall address: 126-2, Ōaza Komatsu, Suō-Ōshima-chō, Ōshima-gun, Yamaguchi-ken; 742-2192
- Climate: Cfa
- Website: www.town.suo-oshima.lg.jp
- Symbols
- Flower: Mikan
- Tree: Mikan

Suō-Ōshima (周防大島町, Suō-Ōshima-chō) is a town and an island located in Ōshima District, Yamaguchi Prefecture, Japan.

Suō-Ōshima was formed on October 1, 2004, from the merger of the former towns of Ōshima, Kuka, Tachibana and Tōwa, all from towns of Ōshima District.

As of April 1, 2017, the town has an estimated population of 13,774. The total area is 138.17 km^{2}.

Suo-Oshima has established a sister island relationship with the County of Kauaʻi, Hawaii in 1963. A 50th Anniversary commemoration was held on Kauaʻi in October 2013. Current Mayors Takumi Shiiki (Suo-Oshima) and Bernard P. Carvalho Jr. (Kauaʻi) signed a Reaffirmation of Friendship agreement.

== Geography ==
=== Climate ===
Suō-Ōshima has a humid subtropical climate (Köppen climate classification Cfa) with hot summers and cool winters. Precipitation is significant throughout the year, but is much higher in summer than in winter. The average annual temperature in Suō-Ōshima is 16.0 °C (60.8 °F). The average annual rainfall is 1,736.1 mm (68.35 in) with June as the wettest month. The temperatures are highest on average in August, at around 26.8 °C (80.2 °F), and lowest in January, at around 6.0 °C (42.8 °F). The highest temperature ever recorded in Suō-Ōshima was 37.5 °C (99.5 °F) on 3 August 2026; the coldest temperature ever recorded was −6.8 °C (19.8 °F) on 27 February 1981.

Climate data for Agenoshō, Suō-Ōshima (1991−2020 normals, extremes 1977−present)
Month	Jan	Feb	Mar	Apr	May	Jun	Jul	Aug	Sep	Oct	Nov	Dec	Year
Record high °C (°F)	19.5 (67.1)	20.7 (69.3)	23.7 (74.7)	27.0 (80.6)	30.6 (87.1)	32.5 (90.5)	35.7 (96.3)	37.5 (99.5)	35.0 (95.0)	30.6 (87.1)	25.7 (78.3)	21.7 (71.1)	37.5 (99.5)
Mean daily maximum °C (°F)	10.0 (50.0)	10.6 (51.1)	13.8 (56.8)	18.6 (65.5)	23.0 (73.4)	25.6 (78.1)	29.5 (85.1)	31.2 (88.2)	27.9 (82.2)	22.9 (73.2)	17.6 (63.7)	12.4 (54.3)	20.3 (68.5)
Daily mean °C (°F)	6.0 (42.8)	6.3 (43.3)	9.3 (48.7)	13.8 (56.8)	18.1 (64.6)	21.4 (70.5)	25.4 (77.7)	26.8 (80.2)	23.9 (75.0)	19.0 (66.2)	13.5 (56.3)	8.3 (46.9)	16.0 (60.8)
Mean daily minimum °C (°F)	1.8 (35.2)	2.0 (35.6)	4.8 (40.6)	9.1 (48.4)	13.6 (56.5)	18.1 (64.6)	22.3 (72.1)	23.5 (74.3)	20.8 (69.4)	15.4 (59.7)	9.6 (49.3)	4.1 (39.4)	12.1 (53.8)
Record low °C (°F)	−5.0 (23.0)	−6.8 (19.8)	−3.8 (25.2)	−1.1 (30.0)	4.9 (40.8)	10.0 (50.0)	15.4 (59.7)	17.6 (63.7)	11.8 (53.2)	3.7 (38.7)	−0.6 (30.9)	−4.2 (24.4)	−6.8 (19.8)
Average precipitation mm (inches)	57.9 (2.28)	85.1 (3.35)	136.0 (5.35)	155.3 (6.11)	179.5 (7.07)	281.3 (11.07)	275.1 (10.83)	117.1 (4.61)	160.3 (6.31)	129.8 (5.11)	88.0 (3.46)	70.2 (2.76)	1,736.1 (68.35)
Average precipitation days (≥ 1.0 mm)	7.1	8.2	10.1	9.7	8.9	11.9	10.2	7.1	8.9	7.3	7.5	7.0	103.9
Mean monthly sunshine hours	161.3	157.0	187.3	209.2	225.5	171.4	206.5	243.8	179.6	186.2	166.0	160.4	2,256.1
Source: Japan Meteorological Agency

=== Demographics ===
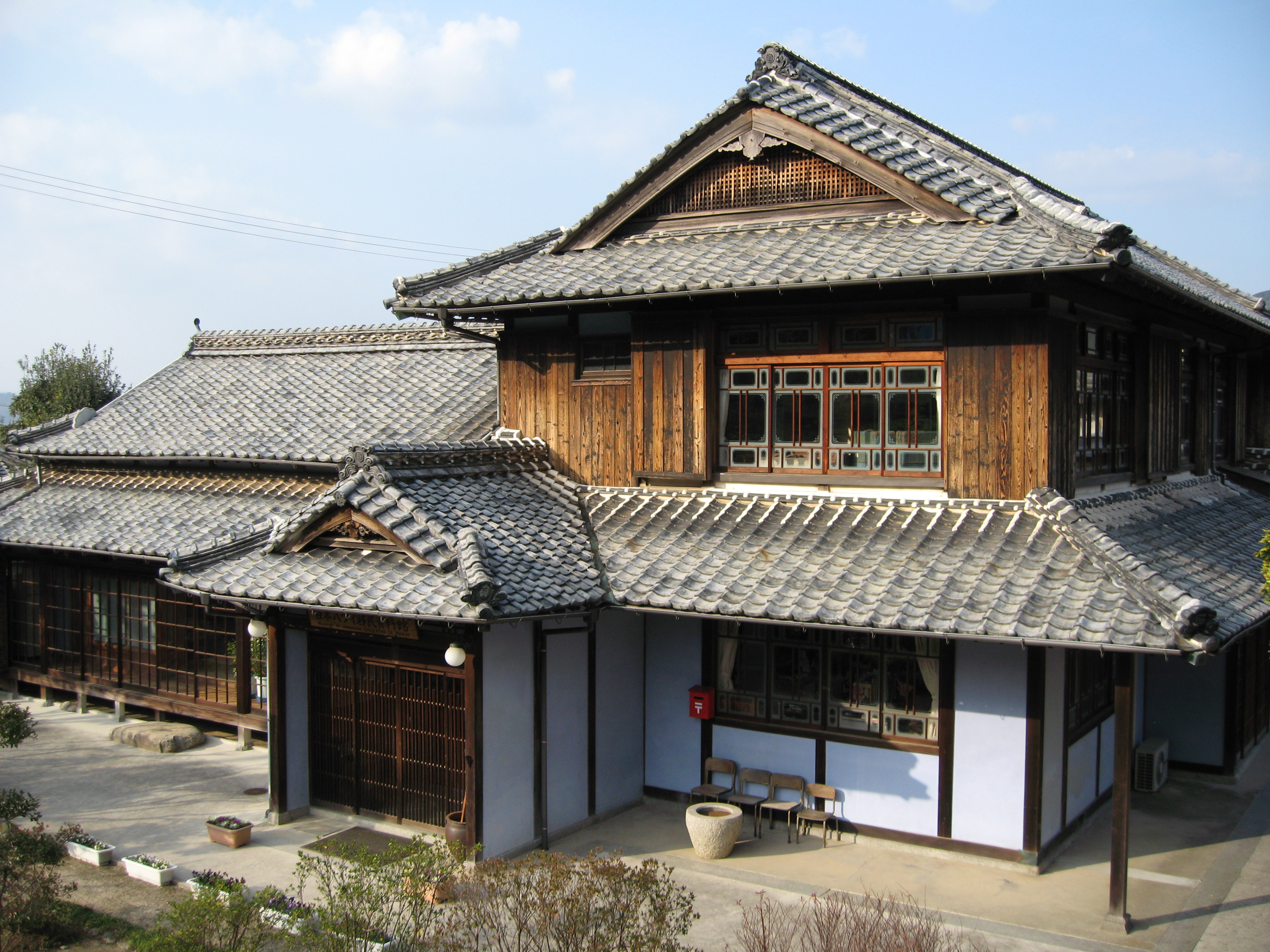
Museum of Japanese Emigration to Hawaii

Per Japanese census data, the population of Suō-Ōshima in 2020 is 14,798 people. Suō-Ōshima has been conducting censuses since 1920.

Historical population
Year	Pop.	±%
1920	52,808	—
1925	54,406	+3.0%
1930	53,778	−1.2%
1935	52,526	−2.3%
1940	49,546	−5.7%
1945	64,928	+31.0%
1950	63,090	−2.8%
1955	57,208	−9.3%
1960	49,739	−13.1%
1965	43,359	−12.8%
1970	37,631	−13.2%
1975	34,331	−8.8%
1980	32,021	−6.7%
1985	29,749	−7.1%
1990	27,119	−8.8%
1995	24,795	−8.6%
2000	23,013	−7.2%
2005	21,392	−7.0%
2010	19,092	−10.8%
2015	17,199	−9.9%
2020	14,798	−14.0%
Suō-Ōshima population statistics

== Education ==
High Schools

- Oshima Shosen
- Suo-Oshima High School

Junior High Schools

- Towa Junior High School
- Kuka Junior High School
- Agenosho Junior High School
- Oshima Junior High School

Elementary Schools

- Yuda Elementary School
- Morino Elementary School
- Joyama Elementary School
- Kuka Elementary School
- Agenosho Elementary School
- Shimanaka Elementary School
- Meishin Elementary School
- Migama Elementary School
- Okiura Elementary School

== Transportation ==
=== Highway ===
- National Route 437
