= Shirley Montag Almon =

American economist (1935–1975)

- Born: Shirley Montag; February 6, 1935; Saxonburg, Pennsylvania, U.S.
- Died: September 29, 1975 (aged 40); College Park, Maryland, U.S.
- Spouse: Clopper Almon Jr. (m. 1958)

Academic background
- Education: Harvard University

Academic work
- Institutions: Council of Economic Advisers; National Bureau of Economic Research; Federal Reserve Board
- Notable ideas: Almon Lag

Shirley Montag Almon (February 6, 1935 – September 29, 1975) was an American economist noted for the Almon Lag.

== Early life and education ==
Shirley Montag was born on February 6, 1935, in Saxonburg, Pennsylvania, the eldest of seven children of Harold and Dorothea Montag. She was educated at Goucher College, Baltimore, and then for her PhD at Harvard University (1964). A core element of her PhD was published in Econometrica (1965), and introduced the now famous technique for estimating distributed lags.

== Career ==
She went on to work at the Women's Bureau, the National Bureau of Economic Research, The Federal Reserve Bank of San Francisco, the Federal Reserve Board and at both Wesley College and Harvard University. Her most noted post was her appointment to the staff of the President's Council of Economic Advisors in 1966.

== Selected publications ==
- Almon, Shirley (1965). "The distributed lag between capital appropriations and expenditures". Econometrica. 33 (1): 178–196. doi:10.2307/1911894. JSTOR 1911894.
- Almon, Shirley (1968). "Lags between investment decisions and their causes". Review of Economics and Statistics. 50 (2): 193–206. doi:10.2307/1926195. JSTOR 1926195.

== Personal life ==
She married Clopper Almon Jr. on June 14, 1958. She was diagnosed with a brain tumor in December 1967 after four years of various symptoms, and died on September 29, 1975, aged 40, in College Park, Maryland.
