= Nowcasting (economics) =

Type of forecasting

Nowcasting in economics is the prediction of the very recent past, the present, and the very near future state of an economic indicator. The term is a portmanteau of "now" and "forecasting" and originates in meteorology. Typical measures used to assess the state of an economy, such as gross domestic product (GDP) or inflation, are only determined after a delay and are subject to revision. In these cases, nowcasting such indicators can provide an estimate of the variables before the true data are known. Nowcasting models have been applied most notably in central banks, who use the estimates to monitor the state of the economy in real-time as a proxy for official measures.

== Principle ==
While weather forecasters know weather conditions today and only have to predict future weather, economists have to forecast the present and even the recent past. Many official measures are not timely due to the difficulty in collecting information. Historically, nowcasting techniques have been based on simplified heuristic approaches but now rely on complex econometric techniques. Using these statistical models to produce predictions eliminates the need for informal judgement.

Nowcast models can exploit information from a large quantity of data series at different frequencies and with different publication lags. Signals about the direction of change in GDP can be extracted from this large and heterogeneous set of information sources (such as jobless figures, industrial orders, trade balances) before the official estimate of GDP is published. In nowcasting, this data is used to compute sequences of current quarter GDP estimates in relation to the real time flow of data releases.

== Development ==
Selected academic research papers show how this technique has developed.

Banbura, Giannone and Reichlin (2011) and Marta Banbura, Domenico Giannone, Michele Modugno & Lucrezia Reichlin (2013) provide surveys of the basic methods and more recent refinements.

Nowcasting methods based on social media content (such as Twitter) have been developed to estimate hidden sentiment such as the 'mood' of a population or the presence of a flu epidemic.

A simple-to-implement, regression-based approach to nowcasting involves mixed-data sampling or MIDAS regressions. The MIDAS regressions can also be combined with machine learning approaches.

Econometric models can improve accuracy. Such models can be built using bayesian vector autoregressions, dynamic factors, bridge equations using time series methods, or some combination with other methods.

== Implementation ==
Economic nowcasting is largely developed by and used in central banks to support monetary policy.

Many of the Reserve Banks of the US Federal Reserve System publish macroeconomic nowcasts. The Federal Reserve Bank of Atlanta publishes GDPNow to track GDP. Similarly, the Federal Reserve Bank of New York publishes a dynamic factor model nowcast. Neither are official forecasts of the Federal Reserve regional bank, system, or the FOMC; nor do they incorporate human judgment.

Nowcasting can also be used to estimate inflation or the business cycle. An example of a business cycle nowcast is the ADS Index.
