= Cheng Hsiao =

Taiwanese-American econometrician and statistician (born 1943)

- 蕭政
- Born: 28 July 1943 (age 82); Chongqing, China
- Education: National Taiwan University (BA); Balliol College, Oxford (BPhil); Stanford University (MS, PhD)
- Scientific career
- Fields: Econometrics
- Institutions: University of California, Berkeley; University of Toronto; University of Southern California
- Thesis: The Combined Use of Cross-Section and Time-Series Data in Econometric Analysis (1972)
- Doctoral advisor: Theodore Wilbur Anderson; Takeshi Amemiya

Chinese name
- Traditional Chinese: 蕭政
- Simplified Chinese: 萧政
Transcriptions
Standard Mandarin
- Hanyu Pinyin: Xiāo Zhèng

Cheng Hsiao (Chinese: 蕭政; born 28 July 1943) is a Taiwanese-American economist, econometrician, and statistician who is a professor of economics at the University of Southern California. Hsiao is known for his works in time series analysis and panel data analysis.

== Early life and education ==
Hsiao was born in Chongqing, China. Because his father was a member of the Kuomintang, Hsiao's family moved to Taiwan through British Hong Kong during the Great Retreat after the Chinese Civil War.

Hsiao was raised in Taiwan and received his primary and secondary education there. He graduated from National Taiwan University with a Bachelor of Arts (B.A.) in economics in 1965, then briefly served in the Republic of China Air Force. After finishing his military service, Hsiao was introduced by his father to Nobel laureate Friedrich Hayek, who wrote a letter recommending Hsiao for studies in England at the University of Oxford. As a member of Balliol College, Hsiao earned a Bachelor of Philosophy (B.Phil.) in 1968. He completed his B.Phil. thesis, "A probablistic analysis of optimum competitive tendering policies," under economist John Flemming.

After graduating from Oxford, Hsiao completed further graduate studies in the United States at Stanford University, earning his Master of Science (M.S.) in statistics in 1970 and his Ph.D. in economics from Stanford in 1972. His doctoral thesis, titled "The Combined Use of Cross-Section and Time-Series Data in Econometric Analysis," was supervised by professors Theodore Wilbur Anderson and Takeshi Amemiya.

== Academic career ==
Hsiao was an assistant professor in economics at University of California, Berkeley, from 1972 to 1977. He then moved to Canada, becoming an associated professor in economics at the University of Toronto between 1977 and 1980, and was a full professor from 1980 to 1985. He relocated to the US afterwards and went to the University of Southern California, where he has been a professor of economics since 1985.

== Bibliography ==
- Intriligator, Michael D.; Bodkin, Ronald G.; Hsiao, Cheng (1996). Econometric models, techniques, and applications (2nd ed.). Upper Saddle River, NJ: Prentice Hall. ISBN 0-13-224775-5. OCLC 33404640.
- Hsiao, Cheng; Pesaran, M. Hashem; Lahiri, Kajal; Lee, Lung Fei, eds. (1999). Analysis of panels and limited dependent variable models : in honour of G.S. Maddala. Cambridge (U.K.): Cambridge University Press. ISBN 0-511-04012-1. OCLC 228069265.
- Hsiao, Cheng; Morimune, Kimio; Powell, James, eds. (2001). Nonlinear statistical modeling : proceedings of the thirteenth International Symposium in Economic Theory and Econometrics : essays in honor of Takeshi Amemiya. New York: Cambridge University Press. ISBN 0-521-66246-X. OCLC 44039814.
- Hsiao, Cheng (2022). Analysis of panel data (4th ed.). Cambridge: Cambridge University Press. ISBN 978-1-009-05774-5. OCLC 1296690708.
