= List of countries by oil imports =

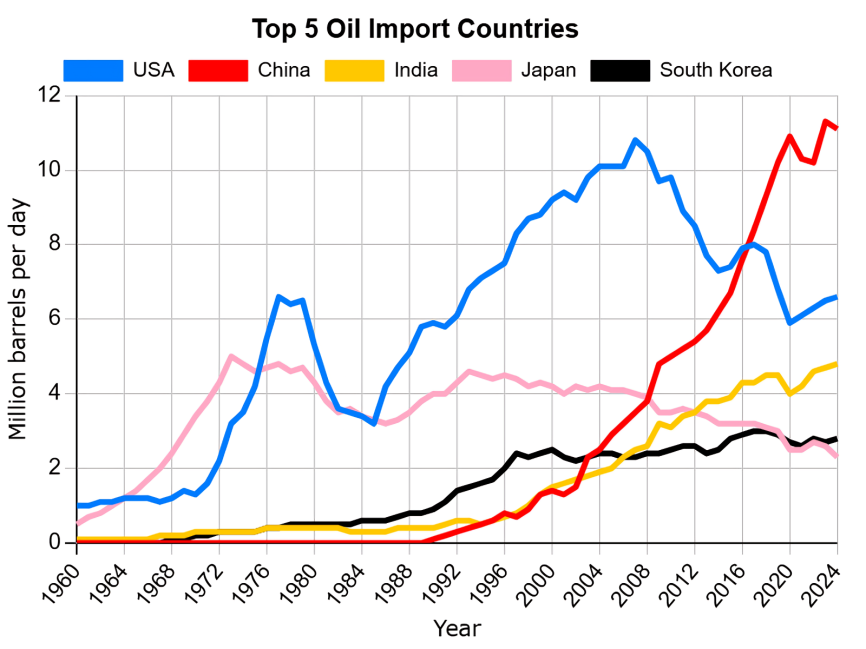
Trends of the top five crude oil importing countries, 1960–2024

This is a list of countries by oil imports. Many countries also export oil, and some export more oil than they import.

== List ==
Crude oil import by country (2024)
| Country/Region | Crude oil imports (bbl/day - est.) | Import value (thousands US$) |
|---|---|---|
| China | 11,072,187 | 324,627,985 |
| United States | 6,588,000 | 174,423,624 |
| India | 4,795,440 | 143,251,338 |
| South Korea | 2,759,119 | 85,379,752 |
| Japan | 2,321,610 | 71,862,705 |
| Netherlands | 974,088 | 48,977,622 |
| Germany | 1,689,240 | 48,387,107 |
| Spain | 1,300,624 | 36,623,430 |
| Thailand | 972,083 | 33,790,610 |
| United Kingdom | 843,019 | 31,009,932 |
| France | 897,630 | 29,827,544 |
| Italy | 1,128,718 | 29,098,644 |
| Singapore | 836,500 | 27,251,231 |
| Belgium | 620,953 | 24,079,128 |
| Taiwan | 842,000 | 23,874,237 |
| Poland | 538,907 | 15,192,763 |
| Greece | 482,252 | 14,772,480 |
| Canada | 657,924 | 14,013,713 |
| Malaysia | 442,500 | 13,905,348 |
| Sweden | 366,285 | 11,262,589 |
| Indonesia | 321,917 | 10,352,976 |
| Brazil | 282,333 | 8,691,716 |
| Israel | – | 7,036,816 |
| Portugal | – | 6,625,447 |
| Pakistan | 162,800 | 5,611,817 |
| Lithuania | 182,000 | 5,540,667 |
| Finland | – | 5,450,135 |
| Australia | 152,374 | 5,206,971 |
| South Africa | 175,083 | 5,174,029 |
| Chile | 180,303 | 5,120,887 |
| Romania | 169,667 | 4,958,724 |
| Austria | – | 4,823,453 |
| Brunei | – | 4,127,828 |
| Bulgaria | 132,167 | 4,051,638 |
| Czech Republic | 156,438 | 4,029,827 |
| Peru | 98,500 | 3,916,208 |
| Philippines | 125,000 | 3,710,129 |
| Hungary | 123,464 | 2,860,748 |
| Denmark | – | 2,840,249 |
| Slovakia | – | 2,529,043 |
| Côte d'Ivoire | 46,200 | 2,427,793 |
| Croatia | 39,182 | 1,799,784 |
| Serbia | – | 1,617,469 |
| Switzerland | – | 1,570,491 |
| Ireland | – | 1,246,881 |
| Nigeria | – | 1,212,062 |
| Azerbaijan | – | 1,020,193 |
| Uruguay | – | 918,734 |
| Dominican Republic | – | 801,988 |
| Sri Lanka | – | 776,544 |
| Norway | – | 691,262 |
| Uzbekistan | – | 620,010 |
| Nicaragua | – | 492,565 |
| Colombia | – | 460,004 |
| United Arab Emirates | 265,000 | 388,470 |
| Jamaica | – | 306,575 |
| Tunisia | – | 279,670 |
| Vietnam | – | 245,547 |
| Saint Lucia | – | 221,286 |
| Bahamas | – | 182,337 |
| Eswatini | – | 171,549 |
| Egypt | 25,333 | 121,917 |
| Bolivia | – | 105,973 |
| Bangladesh | – | 38,981 |
| Mongolia | – | 9,361 |
| Russia | 0 | 7,246 |
| Georgia | – | 5,845 |
| Zambia | – | 675 |
| Guatemala | – | 423 |
| Armenia | – | 285 |
| Belize | – | 240 |
| Botswana | – | 147 |
| Mozambique | – | 138 |
| New Zealand | 103,750 | 85 |
| Costa Rica | – | 49 |
| Lesotho | – | 48 |
| El Salvador | – | 45 |
| Curaçao | – | 33 |
| Qatar | – | 29 |
| DR Congo | – | 28 |
| Saint Helena | – | 22 |
| Aruba | – | 22 |
| Liberia | – | 22 |
| Papua New Guinea | – | 20 |
| Burkina Faso | – | 16 |
| Ukraine | 14,917 | 15 |
| Kuwait | – | 13 |
| Luxembourg | – | 13 |
| Fiji | – | 13 |
| Namibia | – | 11 |
| New Caledonia | – | 9 |
| Faroe Islands | – | 8 |
| Ecuador | 16,021 | 8 |
| Cuba | 64,837 | 8 |
| Angola | – | 7 |
| Algeria | 851 | 7 |
| Moldova | – | 7 |
| Guyana | – | 7 |
| Maldives | – | 5 |
| Rwanda | – | 5 |
| Turkey | 604,562 | – |
| Bahrain | 226,000 | – |
| Belarus | 218,000 | – |
| Puerto Rico | 101,000 | – |
| Kenya | 31,000 | – |
| Venezuela | 8,345 | – |
| Iran | 0 | – |
| Morocco | 0 | – |
| Trinidad and Tobago | 0 | – |

== See also ==
- List of countries by oil exports
