= Marc Nerlove =

American economist (1933–2024)

Marc Leon Nerlove
- Born: October 12, 1933; Chicago, Illinois, U.S.
- Died: July 10, 2024 (aged 90)
- Years active: 1956–2016

Academic background
- Education: Johns Hopkins University; University of Chicago
- Doctoral advisor: Carl Christ

Academic work
- Discipline: Agricultural economics, econometrics
- Institutions: University of Maryland; University of Pennsylvania; Northwestern University; University of Chicago; Yale University; Stanford University; University of Minnesota
- Doctoral students: Pietro Balestra; Daniel Hamermesh; Gavin Wright; Susan Rose-Ackerman; Francis X. Diebold; Quang Vuong; Kenneth F. Wallis
- Awards: John Bates Clark Medal (1969)
- Website: Information at IDEAS / RePEc

Marc Leon Nerlove (October 12, 1933 – July 10, 2024) was an American agricultural economist and econometrician and a distinguished university professor emeritus in agricultural and resource economics at the University of Maryland. He was awarded the John Bates Clark Medal from the American Economic Association (AEA) in 1969 and held appointments at eight different universities from 1958 to 2016. The Clark Medal is awarded to an economist under the age of 40 who “is judged to have made the most significant contribution to economic thought and knowledge”, and when the AEA appointed him as a distinguished fellow in 2012, they cited his development of widely used econometric methods across a range of subjects, including supply and demand, time series analysis, production functions, panel analysis, and family demography.

A widely known contribution by Nerlove in econometrics is the estimator for the random effects model in panel data analysis, which is implemented in most econometric software packages.

== Personal life ==
Marc Leon Nerlove was born on October 12, 1933, in Chicago, Illinois, to Dr. S. H. (Samuel Henry; 1902–1972) and Evelyn (1907–1987) Nerlove. S. H. Nerlove was born in Vitebsk, Russia (now Belarus) and brought to the US by his parents in 1904 and became a professor of business economics at the University of Chicago (c. 1922–1965) then the University of California, Los Angeles (1962–1969). Evelyn Nerlove was born in Cambridge, Massachusetts and worked at the University of Chicago hospital and taught in the School of Social Service Administration until a university nepotism policy forced her to resign after their marriage in 1932 (although she “returned to her profession” in the 1950s). S. H. and Evelyn Nerlove had two other children: Harriet Nerlove (c. 1937–2019), who became a clinical psychologist at Stanford University then in New York City, and Sara “Sally” Nerlove (born c. 1942), who became an anthropologist before spending most of her working life as a program officer at the National Science Foundation (NSF).

Nerlove credited his father with his interest in economics. In addition to being a business economist at Chicago and an early member of the Econometric Society, S. H. Nerlove “inadvertently” became the trustee of Security Life Insurance Company of America Trust (a large, bankrupt midwestern life insurance company) in 1933 during the Great Depression. This company “held mostly foreclosed farm mortgages,” with the farms now being “operated by their former owners as tenants”. S. H. would share stories around the dinner table of his visits to these farms, since the family did not have one of their own in Hyde Park.

Nerlove married Mary Ellen Lieberman (died 2011) in the 1950s and they had two daughters, Susan Nerlove (born c. 1958) and Miriam Nerlove (born c. 1960). Miriam Nerlove become an author and illustrator of children's books, including Who Is David with Evelyn Nerlove in 1985. Marc and Mary Ellen Nerlove divorced in the 1970s, then he married Dr. Anke Meyer (born 1955), a German environmental economist who spent 23 years at the World Bank (1991–2014) and collaborated with him on some of his writings during this time.

Nerlove died on July 10, 2024, at the age of 90.

== Education ==
Nerlove attended the University of Chicago Laboratory Schools from 1939 to 1949, earned a BA with honors in mathematics and general honors in 1952, and was a research assistant at the Cowles Commission for Research in Economics in 1953. He then earned a MA in 1955 and a PhD in economics with distinction in 1956 from the Johns Hopkins University (JHU), where his dissertation was supervised by Carl Christ. Nerlove's other teachers included Milton Friedman, Theodore Schultz, Ta-Chung Liu, Fritz Machlup, and Jacob Marschak.

Nerlove's MA thesis is The Predictive Test as a Tool for Research: The Demand for Meat in the United States and his PhD dissertation is Estimates of the Elasticities of Supply of Corn, Cotton, and Wheat, which was expanded and published in 1958 as The Dynamics of Supply: Estimation of Farmers' Response to Price.

== Teaching ==
Nerlove's teaching career began in 1958 as a visiting lecturer then lecturer at JHU before being appointed to his first professorship in 1959 at the University of Minnesota. From there, he made stops at Stanford University (1960–1965), Yale University (1965–1969), the University of Chicago (1969–1975), Northwestern University (1974–1982), and the University of Pennsylvania (1982–1993) before retiring from the University of Maryland (1993–2016). He also held many visiting appointments, including at Harvard University (1967–1968), four universities and research centers in Germany (University of Mannheim (1968), University of Bonn (1989), Zentrum für Europäische Wirtschaftsforschung (1997), and IZA Institute of Labor Economics (2002)), the University of British Columbia (1971), Fundação Getulio Vargas in Brazil (1974–1978), and Australian National University (1982).

== Other employment ==
Nerlove's employment history also includes federal service. First, as an Analytical Statistician in the Agricultural Marketing Service at the United States Department of Agriculture (1956–1957), then, as a Lieutenant in the United States Army (1957–1959); he was drafted in 1957 then on loan from the Chemical Corps to the (US) Senate Subcommittee on Antitrust and Monopoly in 1958 as an economist at the request of Chairman Estes Kefauver. In addition, Nerlove consulted for the RAND Corporation (1959–1989), Southern Pacific Company (1961), (US) President's Committee to Appraise Employment and Unemployment Statistics (1962), World Bank (1979–1985), and International Food Policy Research Institute (1981–1986).

== Professional service ==
Nerlove's history of professional service includes the Econometric Society (President, 1981), American Economic Association (executive committee, 1977–1979), American Statistical Association (advisory committees to the Bureau of the Census, 1964–1969, and Civil Aeronautics Board, 1966–1968), International Economic Association (chair, Econometrics Section, 1989), National Academy of Sciences (National Research Council Committee on Social Sciences in the NSFn, 1975–1976), NSF (proposal reviewer, 1960–1974), and Social Sciences Research Council (Director, Mathematical Social Science Board Summer Workshop on Lags in Economic Behavior, 1970).

== Awards and honors ==
Nerlove's awards include the John Bates Clark Medal (1969), a Fulbright Research Grant (1962–1963), and two Guggenheim Fellowships (1962–1963; 1978–1979), and he was a distinguished fellow of the American Agricultural Economics Association (1993) and American Economic Association (2012).

== Selected publications ==
=== Articles ===
- Nerlove, Marc (May 1956). "Estimates of the Elasticities of Supply of Selected Agricultural Commodities". American Journal of Agricultural Economics. 38 (2): 496–509. doi:10.2307/1234389. JSTOR 1234389.
- Nerlove, Marc (May 1958). "Adaptive Expectations and Cobweb Phenomena". The Quarterly Journal of Economics. 72 (2): 227–240. doi:10.2307/1880597. JSTOR 1880597.
- Nerlove, Marc; Arrow, Kenneth J. (May 1962). "Optimal Advertising Policy under Dynamic Conditions". Economica. 29 (114): 129–142. doi:10.2307/2551549. hdl:2027/uiug.30112057645332. JSTOR 2551549.
- Balestra, Pietro; Nerlove, Marc (July 1966). "Pooling Cross Section and Time Series Data in the Estimation of a Dynamic Model: The Demand for Natural Gas". Econometrica. 34 (3): 585–612. doi:10.2307/1909771. JSTOR 1909771.
- Diebold, Francis X.; Nerlove, Marc (January–March 1989). "The dynamics of exchange rate volatility: A multivariate latent factor ARCH model". Journal of Applied Economics. 4 (1): 1–21. doi:10.1002/jae.3950040102.

=== Books ===
- Nerlove, Marc; Grether, David M.; Carvalho, Jose L. (1979). Analysis of Economic Time Series: A Synthesis. New York: Academic Press, Inc. ISBN 0-12-515750-9.
- Nerlove, Marc; Razin, Assaf; Sadka, Efraim (1987). Household and Economy: Welfare Economics of Endogenous Fertility. Orlando: Academic Press, Inc. ISBN 0-12-515752-5.
- Nerlove, Marc (2002). Essays in Panel Data Econometrics. Cambridge: Cambridge University Press. ISBN 978-0-521-81534-5.
