= Ōshima District, Yamaguchi =

Yamaguchi Prefecture (Suo Province)

Coordinates: 33.911°N 132.288°E

Location of Ōshima District in Yamaguchi Prefecture

Ōshima (大島郡, Ōshima-gun) is a district located in Yamaguchi Prefecture, Japan.

== Population ==
As of 2003, the district has an estimated population of 22,070 and a density of 159.86 persons per km^{2}. The total area is 138.06 km^{2}.

== Geography ==
The entire territory of the district is an island called Suō-Ōshima. The district is connected with Honshū by a bridge. The area is about 138 square kilometres. There are 22,000 people on the island. The whole island is set aside as a national park. The special product is a mandarin orange called "Ōshima mikan". There are 500 orange groves.

Katazoegahama beach is one of the more popular beaches in the west of Japan. This is also famous for camping. There is a tennis court and a roller skate rink, near the beach. Furthermore, there is a resort hotel.

== Ōshima Bridge ==
The Ōshima Bridge was erected in 1976. It is the second longest span in Japan of this style of bridge. The span of the bridge is 1020m. Its color is pale green.

The tide in the strait under the bridge is known as one of the fastest in Japan.

== Connection with Hawaiʻi ==
Suō-Ōshima is the home of the emigrants from the beginning of the history of the island. The island people go everywhere around the western area of Japanese archipelago. In late 19th and early 20th centuries, thousands of the islanders went to Hawaiʻi and worked at sugar plantation. Suō-Ōshima is also the home of the seagoing people. In the ancient and Middle Ages, sea rovers called Ochi Suigun (Ochi fleet), Kōno Suigun (Kōno fleet), Murakami Suigun (Murakami fleet) inhabits in the western area of the Inland Sea. They had disbanded at 16th century but their descendants became the skilled fisherfolks. They had gone to Hawaiʻi and became the foundation stone of the modern fishery of Hawaiʻi.

The town of Suō-Ōshima is a sister city of Kauaʻi, Hawaiʻi. There is a Hawaiʻi historical museum, which was built in 1999 in Ōshima. Office workers and bus drivers in town wear colorful aloha shirts as a uniform in summer.

In May 2007, Hawaiʻi's replica ancient voyaging canoe Hōkūle'a visited this small island to honour the connection between Suō-Ōshima and Hawaiʻi.

== Tsuneichi Miyamoto ==
Tsuneichi Miyamoto, one of the greatest cultural anthropologist in Japan is the native of this island.

== Towns and villages ==
- Suō-Ōshima

== Merger ==
- On October 1, 2004, the towns of Kuka, Ōshima, Tachibana and Tōwa from Oshima District merged to form the new town of Suō-Ōshima. Since then Suō-Ōshima is the sole town in the district.
