= Tatsumi =

Tatsumi is a Japanese name. It may refer to:

== People ==
=== Surname ===
- Juri Tatsumi (born 1979), Japanese synchronised swimmer
- Kazuhiro Tatsumi (born 1946), Japanese archaeologist
- Naofumi Tatsumi (1845–1907), Japanese general of the Imperial Army
- Noriko Tatsumi (born 1947), Japanese erotic actress
- Shingo Tatsumi (born 1987), Japanese baseball player
- Takayuki Tatsumi (born 1955), Japanese literature professor
- Yoshihiro Tatsumi (1935–2015 ), Japanese manga artist
- Yoshika Tatsumi (born 1982), birthname of Japanese runner Yoshika Arai
- Yuiko Tatsumi (born 1987), Japanese voice actress

=== Given name ===
- Daiyū Tatsumi (born 1940), Japanese former sumo wrestler
- Tatsumi Fujinami (born 1953), Japanese professional wrestler
- Tatsumi Hijikata (1928–1986), Japanese choreographer
- Tatsumi Iida (born 1985), Japanese soccer player
- Tatsumi Kimishima, Japanese businessman for Nintendo
- Tatsumi Kumashiro (1927–1995), Japanese film director
- Tatsumi Nikamoto (born 1953), Japanese actor
- Tatsumi Yoda (born 1940), Japanese businessman

== Places ==
- Tatsumi, Tokyo a region in Koto Ward
- Tatsumi Station, a Tokyo Metro station
- Tatsumi Dam, a dam in Ishikawa Prefecture
- Kita-Tatsumi Station, a train station in Osaka
- Minami-Tatsumi Station, a metro station in Osaka
- Tokyo Tatsumi International Swimming Center, a swimming venue

== Other ==
- Tatsumi (company), a manufacturer of electronics devices and video games
- Tatsumi family, a fictional family from the TV series Kyuukyuu Sentai GoGoFive
- Tatsumi (film), a film directed by Eric Khoo
- Tatsumi-ryū, a school of martial arts
- Tatsumi, a character from the manga series Akame ga Kill!
- Tatsumi Kazehaya, a character from the franchise Ensemble Stars!
