= Carl Christ =

American economist

Carl F. Christ
- Born: September 19, 1923; Chicago, Illinois
- Died: April 21, 2017 (aged 93); Baltimore, Maryland
- Education: University of Chicago
- Scientific career
- Fields: Economics
- Workplaces: Johns Hopkins University
- Doctoral students: Marc Nerlove; Takeshi Amemiya; Herschel Grossman; Naomi Lamoreaux

Carl Finley Christ (September 19, 1923 –April 21, 2017) was an American economist and a Professor Emeritus of Economics at Johns Hopkins University. He is known for his contributions in econometrics, including an early popular textbook.

A native of Chicago, Christ graduated with a BS in physics from the University of Chicago in 1943. He worked as junior physicist for the Manhattan Project from 1943 to 1945, and then as an instructor in physics at Princeton University, 1945–46, before starting graduate studies in economics at the University of Chicago.

In 1970 he was elected as a Fellow of the American Statistical Association.
