= Kazuhiro =

- Gender: Male

Origin
- Origin: Japanese
- Meaning: Different meanings depending on the kanji used

Kazuhiro is a masculine Japanese given name. Notable people with the name include:

- Kazuhiro Fujita (藤田 和日郎; born 1964), Japanese manga artist
- Kazuhiro Furuhashi (古橋 一浩; born 1960), Japanese anime director and supervisor
- Kazuhiro Hamanaka (浜中 和宏; born 1978), professional mixed martial arts (MMA) fighter
- Kazuhiro Haraguchi (原口 一博; born 1959), Japanese politician of the Democratic Party of Japan
- Kazuhiro Inoue (井上 和浩; born 1973), Japanese mixed martial artist
- Kazuhiro Kawata (川田 和宏; born 1982), Japanese football player
- Kirishima Kazuhiro (霧島 一博; born 1959), former sumo wrestler from Makizono, Kagoshima, Japan
- Kazuhiro Kiuchi (born 1960), Japanese manga artist and film director
- Kazuhiro Kiyohara (清原 和博; born 1967), former professional baseball player in Japan
- Kazuhiro Kokubo (國母 和宏; born 1988), Japanese snowboarder
- Kazuhiro Koshi (越 和宏; born 1964), Japanese skeleton racer who has competed since 1991
- Kotoshōgiku Kazuhiro (born 1984), sumo wrestler
- Kazuhiro Maeda (前田 和浩; born 1981), Japanese long-distance runner
- Kazuhiro Mizoguchi (溝口 和洋; born 1962), Japanese javelin thrower
- Kazuhiro Mori (footballer) (森 一紘; born 1981), Japanese football player
- Kazuhiro Mori (cyclist) (盛 一大; born 1982), Japanese cyclist
- Kazuhiro Murakami (村上 和弘; born 1981), Japanese football player
- Kazuhiro Murata (村田 一弘; born 1969), Japanese former football player
- Kazuhiro Nakamura (中村 和裕; born 1979), Japanese MMA fighter known for his antics inside and outside of the ring
- Kazuhiro Nakata (born 1958), Japanese voice actor
- Kazuhiro Nakaya (仲谷 一宏; born 1945), Japanese marine scientist and ichthyologist
- Kazuhiro Ninomiya (二宮 和弘; 1946–2026), Japanese judoka
- Kazuhiro Nishikawa (西川 和宏; born 1986), Japanese shogi player
- Kazuhiro Sano (佐野 和宏; born 1956), Japanese film director, screenwriter and actor
- Kazuhiro Sasaki (佐々木 主浩; born 1968), retired relief pitcher
- Kazuhiro Sato (speed skater) (佐藤 和弘; born 1967), Japanese speed skater
- Kazuhiro Sato (佐藤 和弘; born 1990), Japanese footballer
- Kazuhiro Sugita (杉田 和博; 1941–2025), Japanese police officer
- Kazuhiro Suzuki (鈴木 和裕; born 1976), Japanese football player
- Kazuhiro Takahashi (sledge hockey) (高橋 和廣; born 1978), Japanese sledge hockey player
- Kazuhiro Takanishi (高西 一宏; born 1953), Japanese sport wrestler
- Kazuhiro Takeda (武田 一浩; born 1965), Japanese baseball player
- Kazuhiro Tanaka (pentathlete) (田中 和宏; born 1936), Japanese modern pentathlete
- Kazuhiro Tanaka (田中一弘; born 1970), Japanese professional drifting driver
- Kazuhiro Tatsumi, Japanese archaeologist
- Kazuhiro Wada (和田 一浩; born 1972), Japanese baseball player
- Kazuhiro Yamaji (山路 和弘; born 1954), Japanese actor and voice actor affiliated with the Seinenza Theater Company
- Kazuhiro Yamauchi (山内 一弘; 1932–2009), Japanese baseball player and manager
- Kazuhiro Yoshimura (吉村 和弘; born 1996), Japanese table tennis player

== See also ==
- Kazu Hiro (born 1969), American prosthetic makeup artist
