= Kenneth F. Wallis =

Kenneth F. Wallis is a British econometrician. His main areas of interest have included Time series analysis, forecasting in general and with seasonal adjustment and uncertainty, density forecast evaluation, and macroeconometric modelling. He has published widely in econometrics journals and has written several books including two noted textbooks. He is a fellow of the British Academy, an elected a Fellow of the Econometric Society (1975), and served as the Co-editor of the journal Econometrica. His PhD thesis at Stanford University (1966) On - Some Econometric Problems in the Analysis of Inventory Cycle was supervised by Marc Nerlove.

== Selected publications ==
- Wallis, Kenneth F. (1980) Econometric implications of the rational expectations hypothesis." Econometrica: journal of the Econometric Society: 49-73.
- Wallis, Kenneth F. (1973) Introductory Econometrics. Rev. ed, Gray-Mills
- Wallis, Kenneth F. (1981). Dynamic Models and Expectations Hypotheses. Coventry: Department of Economics, University of Warwick.
- Wallis, Kenneth F, and David F Hendry. (1984). Econometrics and Quantitative Economics. Oxford: Basil Blackwell.
