= Takeshi Amemiya =

Japanese economist (1935–2026)

- 雨宮 健
- Born: March 29, 1935; Tokyo, Japan
- Died: February 25, 2026 (aged 90)
- Education: International Christian University; American University; Johns Hopkins University
- Scientific career
- Fields: Economics
- Workplaces: Stanford University
- Doctoral advisor: Carl F. Christ
- Doctoral students: Cheng Hsiao; Victor Chernozhukov

Takeshi Amemiya (雨宮 健, Amemiya Takeshi; March 29, 1935 – February 25, 2026) was a Japanese economist who specialized in econometrics and the economy of ancient Greece.

Amemiya was the Edward Ames Edmonds Professor of Economics (emeritus) and a professor of classics at Stanford University. He was a Fellow of the Econometric Society, the American Statistical Association and the American Academy of Arts and Sciences (1985).

Amemiya died on February 25, 2026, at the age of 90.

== Education ==
- B.A., 1958, Social Science, International Christian University, Tokyo, Japan
- M.A., 1961, Economics, American University, Washington, DC
- Ph.D., 1964, Economics, Johns Hopkins University, Baltimore, Maryland

== Honors and awards ==
- U.S. Scientist Award, Alexander von Humboldt Foundation, 1988
- Fellowship, Japan Society for Promotion of Science, 1989
- Fellowship, John Simon Guggenheim Foundation, 1975–1976
- Ford Foundation Doctoral Dissertation Fellowship in Economics, Johns Hopkins University, 1963–1965

== Publications ==
=== Books ===
- Amemiya, Takeshi (1985). Advanced econometrics. Cambridge, Massachusetts: Harvard University Press. ISBN 9780674005600.
- Amemiya, Takeshi (1994). Studies in Econometric Theory: The Collected Essays of Takeshi Amemiya. Economists of the Twentieth Century. Aldershot, England: Edward Elgar Pub. ISBN 9781852787974.
- Amemiya, Takeshi (1994). Introduction to Statistics and Econometrics. Cambridge, Massachusetts and London, England: Harvard University Press. ISBN 9780674462250.
- Amemiya, Takeshi (2007). Economy and Economics of Ancient Greece. Routledge Explorations in Economic History. Vol. 33. London: Routledge. ISBN 9780415701549.

=== Chapter in book ===
- Amemiya, Takeshi (1983), "Nonlinear Regression Models" (PDF), in Griliches, Zvi; Intriligator, Michael D. (eds.), Handbook of Econometrics, vol. 1, Amsterdam: North Holland, pp. 333–389, ISBN 9780444861856.

=== Selected journal articles ===
- Amemiya, Takeshi; Fuller, Wayne A. (1967). "A Comparative Study of Alternative Estimators in a Distributed Lag Model". Econometrica. 35 (3–4): 509–529. doi:10.2307/1905652. JSTOR 1905652.
- Amemiya, Takeshi; Wu, Roland Y. (1972). "The Effect of Aggregation on Prediction in the Autoregressive Model". Journal of the American Statistical Association. 67 (339): 628–632. doi:10.2307/2284454. JSTOR 2284454.
- Amemiya, Takeshi (1973). "Generalized Least Squares with an Estimated Autocovariance Matrix". Econometrica. 41 (4): 723–732. doi:10.2307/1914092. JSTOR 1914092.
- Amemiya, Takeshi (1973). "Regression Analysis when the Dependent Variable Is Truncated Normal". Econometrica. 41 (6): 997–1016. doi:10.2307/1914031. JSTOR 1914031.
- Amemiya, Takeshi (1974). "Multivariate Regression and Simultaneous Equation Models when the Dependent Variables Are Truncated Normal". Econometrica. 42 (6): 999–1012. doi:10.2307/1914214. JSTOR 1914214.
- Amemiya, Takeshi (1977). "The Maximum Likelihood and the Nonlinear Three-Stage Least Squares Estimator in the General Nonlinear Simultaneous Equation Model". Econometrica. 45 (4): 955–968. doi:10.2307/1912684. JSTOR 1912684.
- Amemiya, Takeshi (1978). "The Estimation of a Simultaneous Equation Generalized Probit Model" (PDF). Econometrica. 46 (5): 1193–1205. doi:10.2307/1911443. JSTOR 1911443.
- Amemiya, Takeshi (1979). "The Estimation of a Simultaneous-Equation Tobit Model". International Economic Review. 20 (1): 169–181. doi:10.2307/2526423. JSTOR 2526423.
- Amemiya, Takeshi (1980). "Selection of Regressors". International Economic Review. 21 (2): 331–354. doi:10.2307/2526185. JSTOR 2526185.
- Amemiya, Takeshi; MaCurdy, Thomas E. (1986). "Instrumental-Variable Estimation of an Error-Components Model". Econometrica. 54 (4): 869–880. doi:10.2307/1912840. JSTOR 1912840.
