= Ōshima, Yamaguchi =

Dissolved municipality in Yamaguchi prefecture, Japan

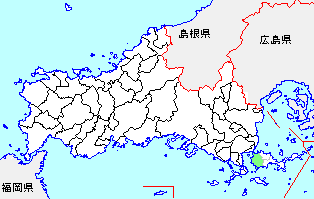
Map of Ōshima, Yamaguchi

Ōshima (大島町, Ōshima-chō) was a town located in Ōshima District, Yamaguchi Prefecture, Japan.

As of 2003, the town had an estimated population of 7,072 and a density of 149.55 persons per km^{2}. The total area was 47.29 km^{2}.

On October 1, 2004, Ōshima, along with the towns of Kuka, Tachibana and Tōwa (all from Ōshima District), was merged to create the town of Suō-Ōshima.
