= Boyi =

Boyi and Bo Yi, may refer to the following people:

- Boyi (legendary leader), culture hero in Chinese mythology, from before the Xia era
- Boyi (prince) (伯夷), ancient Chinese prince (brother of Shuqi), from the era of transition between Shang and Zhou
- Boyi (Jiang) (伯夷), founder of the Lü state, from the Spring and Autumn period
- Guo Jia (170–207), courtesy name Boyi, adviser to the warlord Cao Cao, of the Three Kingdoms era
- Boyi Bhimanna, (1911–2005), Indian poet writing in Telugu
- Feng Boyi (born 1960; 馮博一), Chinese art critic

== See also ==
- Bo (disambiguation)
- Yi (disambiguation)
- Yibo (disambiguation)
- 博一 (disambiguation)
- 博義 (disambiguation)
