= Kuka, Yamaguchi =

Dissolved municipality in Yamaguchi prefecture, Japan

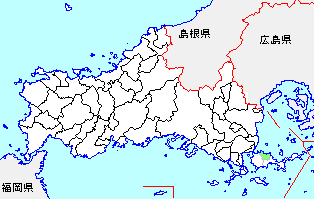
Map of Kuka, Yamaguchi

Kuka (久賀町, Kuka-chō) was a town located in Ōshima District, Yamaguchi Prefecture, Japan.

As of 2003, the town had an estimated population of 4,321 and a density of 186.89 persons per km^{2}. The total area was 23.12 km^{2}.

On October 1, 2004, Kuka, along with the towns of Ōshima, Tachibana and Tōwa (all from Ōshima District), was merged to create the town of Suō-Ōshima.
