= Yibo (disambiguation) =

Yibo (移拨), who reigned 749–751, was khagan of Turgesh during the Tang era.

Yibo or Yi Bo may also refer to:

== People ==
- Count Yi of Cao (曹夷伯; Cáo Yí Bó) reigned 864–835 BC, ruler of the State of Cao (曹) during the Zhou era
- Grand Prince Hyoryŏng (효령대군; 孝寧大君; 1396–1486), Korean royal prince of the Joseon, personal name Yi Bo (이보; 李補)
- Grand Prince Nŭngwŏn (능원대군; 綾原大君; 1598–1656), Korean politician of the late Joseon period and royal prince, personal name Yi Bo (이보; 李俌)
- Yi Bo Luo (born 1964), a botanist with an International Standardized botanical author abbreviation; see List of botanists by author abbreviation (W–Z)
- Bo Yibo (薄一波; 1908–2007), Chinese politician
- Yibo Koko (born 1967), Nigerian filmmaker
- Ma Yibo (马弋博; 馬弋博; born 1980), Chinese field hockey player
- Zhao Yibo (赵一博; born 1988), Chinese soccer player
- Hou Yibo (侯一博; born 1991), Chinese team handball player
- Sha Yibo (沙一博; born 1991), Chinese soccer player
- Wang Yibo (王一博; born 1997), Chinese pro-motorcycle racer, driver, actor, singer, model, dancer; member of the KPOP boyband Uniq
- YiBo Mai, Chinese race car driver who participated in the 2021 TCR Asia Series
- Lee Yi Bo, Malaysian badminton player who participated in the 2024 BWF season

== Characters ==
- Cai Yi Bo, a character from the 2020 TV show White War (TV series) (戰毒)
- Prince Yi Bo, a character from the 2022 TV show The King of Tears, Lee Bang-won (태종 이방원)

== Other uses ==
- Battle of El Yibo, a 1941 East African battle of WW2 at El Yibo, Kenyan Northern Frontier District, Kenya

== See also ==
- Bo (disambiguation)
- Boyi (disambiguation)
- Yi (disambiguation)
- 一博 (disambiguation)
