= Tōwa, Yamaguchi =

Dissolved municipality in Yamaguchi prefecture, Japan

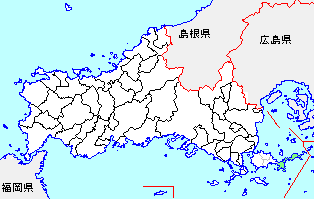
Map of Tōwa, Yamaguchi

Tōwa (東和町, Tōwa-chō) was a town located in Ōshima District, Yamaguchi Prefecture, Japan.

As of 2003, the town had an estimated population of 5,028 and a density of 129.59 persons per km^{2}. The total area was 38.80 km^{2}.

On October 1, 2004, Tōwa, along with the towns of Kuka, Ōshima and Tachibana (all from Ōshima District), was merged to create the town of Suō-Ōshima.
