= Singapore Institute of Purchasing and Materials Management =

Non-profit organization

- Institut Pembelian dan Pengurusan Bahan Singapura (Malay) 新加坡采购与物流管理学院 (Chinese)
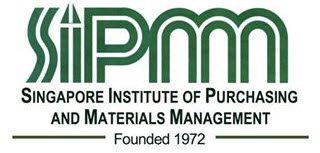
- Singapore Institute of Purchasing and Materials Management
- Abbreviation: SIPMM
- Founded: 1972; 54 years ago
- Type: Professional Body
- Purpose: To lead professional competence in Logistics, Procurement and Supply Chain sectors
- Location: Singapore
- Coordinates: 1°19′43.96″N 103°44′30.72″E
- Website: sipmm.edu.sg

The Singapore Institute of Purchasing and Materials Management (SIPMM) is a not-for-profit, independent professional organisation founded in 1972 with the aim to enhance managerial effectiveness of professionals in purchasing, logistics, materials and supply chain management. The mission of SIPMM is to lead professional competence in purchasing, materials, logistics, and supply chain management.

In 1975, SIPMM became the first Singapore organisation to be admitted to the International Federation of Purchasing & Supply Management (IFPSM). Since then, the Institute has worked with fellow national affiliates of IFPSM, developing strategic relationship with leading institutes worldwide. In 1980, SIPMM initiated closer cooperation of Asia-Pacific institutes within the IFPSM and became the first institute to host the inaugural IFPSM Asia-Pacific regional conference. Subsequently in 1990, the Institute hosted the IFPSM sixth Asia-Pacific regional conference.

In 1998, SIPMM conducted a pilot survey on the Singapore Purchasing Managers' Index (PMI). The composite index took into account the Singapore’s economic structure. The Singapore PMI was launched in January 1999 and since then, SIPMM has published the monthly index.
