= Taga Takatada =

Samurai

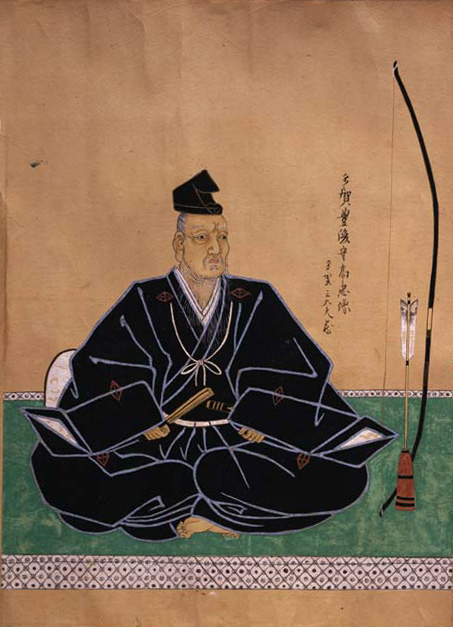
- Portrait by Matsudaira Sadanobu (1795)
- Born: 1425
- Died: 1486 (aged 60–61)
- Military career
- Allegiance: Kyōgoku clan

Taga Takatada (多賀高忠; 1425 – 1486) was a Japanese military leader of the Muromachi period. He was a senior vassal of the Kyōgoku clan, and served as the deputy head of the shogunate's board of retainers or samurai-dokoro. He was a talented poet who wrote waka and renga. He also excelled in mounted archery.
