= Hiroyoshi =

- Gender: Male

Origin
- Origin: Japanese
- Meaning: Different meanings depending on the kanji used

Hiroyoshi (written: 広吉, 広好, 広義, 啓義, 裕義 or 博義) is a masculine Japanese given name. Notable people with the name include:

- Prince Fushimi Hiroyoshi (伏見宮博義王, Fushimi-no-miya Hiroyoshi-ō) (1897–1938), Japanese prince and Imperial Japanese Navy officer
- Hiroyoshi Kamata (鎌田 啓義) (born 1997), Japanese footballer
- Hiroyoshi Kubota (窪田 博芳) (born 1946), Japanese sprinter
- Hiroyoshi Kuwabara (桑原 裕義) (born 1971), Japanese footballer
- Hiroyoshi Matsui (born 1966), Japanese rower
- Hiroyoshi Nishi (西 博義) (born 1948), Japanese politician
- Hiroyoshi Nishizawa (西澤 広義) (1920–1944), Japanese World War II flying ace
- Hiroyoshi Ohashi (大橋 広好) (born 1936), Japanese botanist
- Hiroyoshi Sasakawa (born 1966), Japanese politician and businessman
- Hiroyoshi Shiratori (born 1933), Japanese weightlifter
- Hiroyoshi Takayama (高山 啓義) (born 1974), Japanese football referee
- Hiroyoshi Tenzan (天山 広吉) (born 1971), Japanese professional wrestler
