= Takaishi =

Takaishi may refer to:

- Takaishi, Osaka, a city in Osaka Prefecture, Japan
  - Takaishi Station
- Takaishi, a character in Kodomo no Omocha
- Takeru "T.K." Takaishi, a character in Digimon

== People with the surname ==
- Katsuo Takaishi (高石 勝男, 1906–1966), Japanese swimmer
