= Torii Naritsugu =

Torii Naritsugu (鳥居 成次, 1570–1631) was a military commander and daimyō during the early Edo period. The third son of Torii Mototada, he served Tokugawa Ieyasu from a young age and was honored for his military service during the Battle of Sekigahara. In 1603, he became lord of Yamura fief in Kai province (worth 35,000 koku). In 1620, he was appointed as an attendant elder retainer to Tokugawa Tadanaga, but was removed from his post and dispossessed in 1632. Banished to his nephew Torii Tadatsune's domain in Yamagata, he died in 1631.
