= Yukio Tsuda =

Yukio Tsuda may refer to:

- Yukio Tsuda (footballer), Japanese footballer
- Yukio Tsuda (professor), Japanese professor
