= Hirokazu =

- Gender: Male

Origin
- Origin: Japanese
- Meaning: Different meanings depending on the kanji used

Hirokazu is a masculine Japanese given name.

== Written forms ==
Hirokazu can be written using different kanji characters and can mean:

- 弘和, "vast, harmony"
- 博一, "command, one"
- 宏和, "wide, harmony"
- 裕和, "abundant, harmony"
- 宏一, "wide, one"
- 弘多, "vast, many"
- 洋一, "ocean, one"
- 博和, "command, harmony"
- 寛和, "tolerant, harmony"
- 広和, "broad, harmony"

The name can also be written in hiragana (ひろかず) or katakana (ヒロカズ).

== People with the name ==
- Hirokazu Goshi (郷司 弘和; born 1966), Japanese former football player
- Hirokazu Hasegawa (長谷川 博一; born 1986), Japanese footballer
- Hirokazu Hisayuki (久行 宏和), Japanese character designer and animation director for Sunrise
- Hirokazu Ibata (井端 弘和; born 1975), Japanese professional baseball player in Japan's Nippon Professional Baseball
- Hirokazu Kanazawa (金澤 弘和; 1931–2019), world-renowned Japanese master of Shotokan karate
- Hirokazu Kobayashi (aikidoka) (小林 裕和; 1929–1998), Japanese aikido teacher, student of the founder of aikido Morihei Ueshiba
- Hirokazu Kore-eda (是枝 裕和; born 1962), Japanese film director, producer, screenwriter and editor
- Hirokazu Matsuno (松野 博一; born 1962), Japanese politician of the Liberal Democratic Party
- Hirokazu Nakaima (仲井眞 弘多; born 1939), Japanese bureaucrat, a business leader, and a politician
- Hirokazu Ninomiya (二宮 洋一; 1917–2000), Japanese football player and manager
- Hirokazu Ota (太田 裕和; born 1971), Japanese former football player
- Hirokazu Otsubo (大坪 博和; born 1979), Japanese football player
- Hirokazu Sasaki (佐々木 博和; born 1962), Japanese former football player
- Hirokazu Shiba (芝 博一; born 1950), Japanese politician of the Democratic Party of Japan
- Hirokazu Tanaka (田中 宏和; born 1957), Japanese composer and musician who has written music for video games produced by Nintendo
- Hirokazu Ueno (上野 裕和; born 1977), Japanese shogi player
- Hirokazu Ueyonabaru (上与那原 寛和; born 1971), Paralympian athlete from Japan competing mainly in category T52 long distance events
- Hirokazu Usami (宇佐美 宏和; born 1987), Japanese football player
- Hirokazu Yagi (八木 弘和; born 1959), Japanese former ski jumper who competed between 1979 and 1984
- Hirokazu Yasuhara (安原 広和; born 1965), Japanese video game designer and Sonic Team's 2nd Assistant President
- Hirokazu Yoshikawa (吉川博和), American psychologist
