= Tokomaro =

Tokomaro or Tokumaro (徳麻呂) was a soldier of 7th-century AD Japan, during the Asuka period. He and four slaves of the Ōi temple served in the Jinshin War of 672 and fought at the Battle of Nakatsu-michi.

His name appears in the history book Nihon Shoki at the Battle of Nakatsu-michi of Yamato Province at the beginning of the 7th month of the year 672 (by the Japanese calendar). Yamato had been one of the two major fronts of the war. Ōtomo no Fukei, the commander general of this front for Prince Ōama's (Emperor Tenmu) side, divided his army into three divisions along the Kamitsu-michi ("upper road"), Nakatsu-michi ("middle road") and Shimotsu-michi ("lower road"). Enemy general Inukai no Isokimi dispatched his commander Ioi no Kujira and sent 200 soldiers against the thin center of Fukei. Five slaves of Ōi temple, including Tokomaro, took the lead in the defence and shot arrows, which stopped Ioi's advance. Then Fukei's right division broke Inukai's left at Kamitsu-michi, and rushed to the rear of the enemy, turning the flank. Yamato province was won by Fukei soon after this battle.

The Nihon Shoki describes details of the war but merely mentions background of rank-and-file soldiers. "Slaves of Oi temple" is evidence of the broad mobilization effort and an example of the loyalty of slaves in ancient Japan.
