= Tachibana, Yamaguchi =

Dissolved municipality in Yamaguchi prefecture, Japan

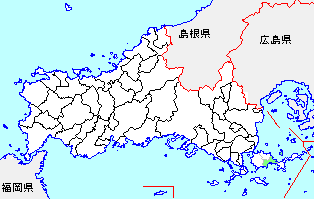
Map of Tachibana, Yamaguchi

Tachibana (橘町, Tachibana-chō) was a town located in Ōshima District, Yamaguchi Prefecture, Japan.

As of 2003, the town had an estimated population of 5,649 and a density of 195.81 persons per km^{2}. The total area was 28.85 km^{2}.

On October 1, 2004, Tachibana, along with the towns of Kuka, Ōshima and Tōwa (all from Ōshima District), was merged to create the town of Suō-Ōshima.
