= PRIX index =

The PRIX index (or Political Risk for Oil Exports Index) is a financial indicator for international oil markets to understand the political risks associated with oil exports. The index forecasts and sums up political risks around the world that may affect the supply of oil to international markets. It is based on the same methodology as a Purchasing Managers' Index. Around 250 country analysts provide input, which is subsequently used to calculate an index value for each of the world’s 20 largest oil-exporting countries. Each of these country values is subsequently weighted by the exports of the countries in order to compute a single, weighted, global PRIX index number that sums up the political risk for international oil markets during the coming three months.

Variations in oil exports are an important component of global oil price formation. Thus, the PRIX index forecast may help identify potential trajectories of international price of oil. However, other factors than political risks affect the global balance between supply and demand of oil and thus contribute to setting the oil price. The index therefore does not predict the oil price itself as it does not cover economic and technological developments, but it can function as a component in oil price forecasting.

== History ==
The index was first published in January 2015. It is updated quarterly and made freely available to the public via the index website and Twitter feed. The index is independent and is not owned by any institutions, companies or governments.

== Methodology ==
Country analysts are asked whether political developments during the coming three months are likely to lead to reduced, unchanged, or increased oil exports from a given country. The following diffusion index formula is used to process their answers: INDEX = (P1*1) + (P2*0.5) + (P3*0) where:

P1 = percentage number of country analysts who foresaw political developments leading to increased exports;
P2 = percentage number of country analysts who foresaw political developments leading leaving oil exports unchanged;
P3 = percentage number of country analysts who foresaw political developments leading to reduced exports.

An index number of 50 means that oil exports are not likely to change. A number above 50 indicates that political developments may lead to higher oil exports, while a value below 50 indicates lower exports. The further away from 50 the index number is, the greater the expected change in exports, and the greater the likelihood of an impact on the oil price. The full theoretical range of index values is 0–100. However, in practice the global index value will normally oscillate around 50 and stay within the range of 40–60.

Each country analyst reports on one of the 20 countries, and is required to have in-depth expertise on that country. Country analysts come from a variety of professional backgrounds, but are normally based in the country that they report on. In some cases country analysts outside the country in question are used, and should then speak the local language, visit the country frequently and follow the political situation closely.
