= Jobless claims =

Data issued by U.S. Department of Labor

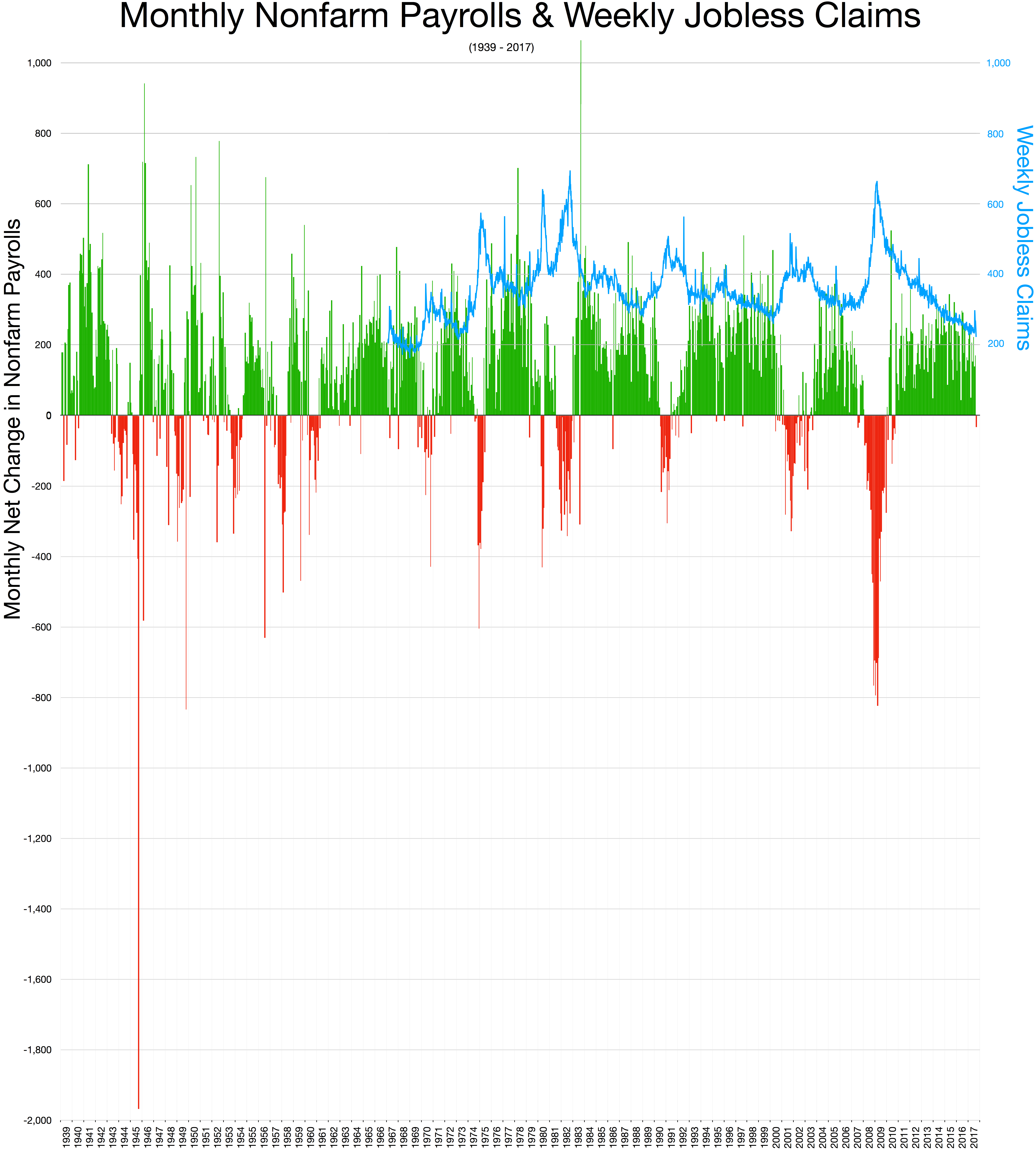
Nonfarm payrolls history chart

Initial jobless claims are a data point issued by the U.S. Department of Labor as part of its weekly Unemployment Insurance Weekly Claims Report. Initial jobless claims refer to claims for unemployment benefits filed by unemployed individuals with state unemployment agencies.

Initial claims should not be confused with the number of people who actually receive unemployment benefits. For one, initial claims don't include continued claims—individuals who claim benefits for additional weeks of unemployment beyond their initial claim. Additionally, not all claimants will actually receive unemployment benefits.

The U.S. Department of Labor's Employment and Training Administration publishes weekly unemployment-insurance claims data, which are used in current analysis of unemployment trends nationally and in each state.

== Market impact ==
The weekly release of the report can be a market moving event. The employment situation is extremely important for a macroeconomic analysis, so the financial markets track employment indicators, although this is a low impact indicator compared with the monthly BLS's "Employment Report". This report tracks how many new people have filed for unemployment benefits in the previous week. It is a good gauge of the U.S. job market. For instance, when more people file for unemployment benefits, fewer people have jobs, and vice versa. Investors can use this report to gather pertinent information about the economy, but it's a very volatile data, so the four-week average of jobless claims is monitored.

Initial jobless claims measure emerging unemployment, and it is released after one week, but continued claims data measure the number of persons claiming unemployment benefits, and it is released one week later than the initial claims, that's the reason initial have a higher impact in the financial markets.

== Comparison to other indicators ==
The jobless claims report is generally monitored closely as one of the few weekly labor market indicators produced by the government. The closely watched Employment Situation Summary from the Bureau of Labor Statistics, colloquially referred to as the "jobs report", is only produced monthly.

Jobless claims are also one of the few near-realtime indicators produced by the government. Each week's report includes data for the week ending on the preceding Saturday of the report's release, providing a measure of labor market activity less than a week after it occurs. By comparison, the monthly Employment Situation Summary's survey reference period is the week or the pay period including the 12th day of the month, which means the time from data collection to release can extend for weeks.

Unlike many labor market indicators reported by the Bureau of Labor Statistics, jobless claims are not collected by survey but are instead reported by state unemployment agencies and thus represent a direct measurement of actual labor market activity.
