= Kazuhiro Tatsumi =

Kazuhiro Tatsumi (辰巳 和弘, Tatsumi Kazuhiro; born 3 January 1946, in Osaka) is a Japanese archaeologist, history scholar and museum curator. He was a lecturer at Doshisha University until his retirement in 2011. He is knowledgeable about the domestic practices of early Japanese peoples. and has been referenced in numerous books. Tatsumi has authored many books and papers. In 1981 he published his findings on research in the Kitaoka Otsuka tumulus in Inasa, Shizuoka, which was printed by the Inasa-cho Board of Education.
