= Tankan (Japan) =

Poll on business confidence released by the Bank of Japan

Tankan (短観), a shorthand for kigyō tanki keizai kansoku chōsa (企業短期経済観測調査, literally Business Short-Term Economic Sentiment Survey), is a quarterly poll of business confidence reported by the Bank of Japan showing the status of the Japanese economy. It is one of the key financial measures in Japan and has considerable influence in companies' shares prices and the currency rate. The large manufacturers index component of the Tankan is considered "a leading gauge of economic growth".
