= Dynamic factor =

Economic time series comparator

In econometrics, a dynamic factor (also known as a diffusion index) is a series which measures the co-movement of many time series. It is used in certain macroeconomic models.

A diffusion index is intended to indicate

- the changes of the fraction of economic data time series which increase or decrease over the selected time interval,
- an increase or decrease in future economic activity,
- provide some correlation to the business sentiment of companies.

Formally

$$X_{t}=\Lambda_{t}F_{t}+e_{t},$$

where $F_{t}=(f^{\top}_{t},\dots,f^{\top}_{t-q})$ is the vector of lagged factors of the variables in the $T \times N$ matrix $X_{t}$ (T is the number of observations and N is the number of variables), $\Lambda_{t}$ are the factor loadings, and $e_{t}$ is the factor error.

== History ==
Diffusion indexes were originally designed to help identify business cycle turning points.

== Example ==
A diffusion index of monthly employment levels across industries measures the degree to which a growth in employment levels in a population is made up of growth in all industries versus sharp growth in just a few industries. In one published data series on that design, the diffusion index is computed from a panel of discrete time series by assigning a value of 0 to an observation if it is lower than its analog in the previous month, 50 if it is at the same level, and 100 if it has increased. The average of these component values for a given period over the time period is a diffusion index. Relative to the equation above, the underlying factors $f_t$ are drawn from the values {0, 50, 100} based on employment changes, and the diffusion index $X_{t}$ works out to be the percentage of these employment counts that increased in the previous month. Some researchers have reported that a diffusion index of monthly manufacturing-sector employment is a leading indicator of turning points in the business cycle.

== Literature ==
- Forni, Mario & Lippi, Marco, 2001. "The Generalized Dynamic Factor Model: Representation Theory", Econometric Theory, vol. 17(6), pages 1113-41.
- Getz, Patricia M. and Mark Ulmer. "Diffusion indexes: an economic barometer", Monthly Labor Review, April 1990, Vol. 113, No. 4, pp. 13–22.
- Stock, James H & Watson, Mark W, 2002. "Macroeconomic Forecasting Using Diffusion Indexes", Journal of Business & Economic Statistics, vol. 20(2), pages 147-62.
