= Thirteen Buddhas of Hokkaido =

Group of sacred sites in Hokkaido, Japan

The Thirteen Buddhas of Hokkaido(北海道十三仏霊場, Hokkaidō jūsan butsu reijō) are a group of 13 Buddhist sacred sites on Hokkaido, Japan. They are dedicated to the Thirteen Buddhas.

== Directory ==
Number	Temple	Dedication	Location
1.	Ryukō-ji	Fudō-myōō	Sapporo
2.	Seigan-ji	Shaka Nyorai	Sapporo
3.	Konpiramitsu-ji	Monju Bosatsu	Sapporo
4.	Kōjō-ji	Fugen Bosatsu	Sapporo
5.	Konpira Daihon-in	Jizō Bosatsu	Otaru
6.	Hōzō-in	Miroku Bosatsu	Otaru
7.	Amida-in	Yakushi Nyorai	Yoichi
8.	Konpira-ji	Kannon Bosatsu	Abuta
9.	Shingon-in	Seishi Bosatsu	Abuta
10.	Fudō-ji	Amida Nyorai	Date
11.	Kannon-ji	Ashuku Nyorai	Shiraoi
12.	Ryusho-ji	Dainichi Nyorai	Yūfutsu
13.	Gyokusen-ji	Kokūzō Bosatsu	Ishikari

== See also ==
- Thirteen Buddhas
