= Thirteen Buddhas of Chichibu =

Buddhist sacred sites in Saitama, Japan

The Thirteen Buddhas of Chichibu（秩父十三仏霊場, Chichibu jūsan butsu reijō）are a group of 13 Buddhist sacred sites in Saitama Prefecture, Japan. (Chichibu Province (知々夫国, Chichibu no kuni) was an old province of Japan in the area that is today the western part of Saitama Prefecture.) The temples are dedicated to the Thirteen Buddhas.

== Directory ==
| Number | Temple | Dedication |
|---|---|---|
| 1. | Manpuku-ji | Fudō-myōō |
| 2. | Hōen-ji | Shaka Nyorai |
| 3. | Monju-dō | Monju Bosatsu |
| 4. | Hōrin-in | Fugen Bosatsu |
| 5. | Toku'un-ji | Jizō Bosatsu |
| 6. | Genzō-ji | Miroku Bosatsu |
| 7. | Hōyō-ji | Yakushi Nyorai |
| 8. | Zuigan-ji | Kannon Bosatsu |
| 9. | Iō-ji | Seishi Bosatsu |
| 10. | Amida-ji | Amida Nyorai |
| 11. | Taiyō-ji | Ashuku Nyorai |
| 12. | Shōan-ji | Dainichi Nyorai |
| 13. | Kokūzō-ji | Kokūzō Bosatsu |

== See also ==
- Thirteen Buddhas
