= Thirteen Buddhist Sites of Yamagata =

The Thirteen Buddhist Sites of Yamagata（山形十三仏霊場, Yamagata jūsan butsu reijō）are a group of 13 Buddhist sacred sites in Yamagata Prefecture, Japan. The temples are dedicated to the Thirteen Buddhas.

== Directory ==
Number	Temple	Dedication
1.	宗福院	Fudō-myōō
2.	乗船寺	Shaka Nyorai
3.	龍源寺	Monju Bosatsu
4.	正源寺	Fugen Bosatsu
5.	見性寺	Jizō Bosatsu
6.	弥勒院	Miroku Bosatsu
7.	永林寺	Yakushi Nyorai
8.	月蔵院	Kannon Bosatsu
9.	上町勢至堂	Seishi Bosatsu
10.	誓願寺	Amida Nyorai
11.	天性寺	Ashuku Nyorai
12.	平泉寺	Dainichi Nyorai
13.	万松寺	Kokūzō Bosatsu

== See also ==
- Thirteen Buddhas
