= Thirteen Buddhist Sites of Musashi =

Buddhist sacred sites in Saitama, Japan

The Thirteen Buddhist Sites of Musashi (武蔵国十三仏霊場, Musashi no kuni jūsan butsu reijō) are a group of 13 Buddhist sacred sites in Saitama Prefecture, Japan. The temples are dedicated to the Thirteen Buddhas. Musashi was the previous name of Saitama. All of the temples are affiliated with Tendai Buddhism.

== Directory ==
Number	Temple	Dedication
1.	天然寺	Fudō-myōō
2.	明見院	Shaka Nyorai
3.	広福寺	Monju Bosatsu
4.	延命寺	Fugen Bosatsu
5.	満福寺	Jizō Bosatsu
6.	松福院	Miroku Bosatsu
7.	浄光寺	Yakushi Nyorai
8.	円光寺	Kannon Bosatsu
9.	大聖寺	Seishi Bosatsu
10.	長福寺	Amida Nyorai
11.	高蔵寺	Ashuku Nyorai
12.	瑠璃光寺	Dainichi Nyorai
13.	常光院	Kokūzō Bosatsu

== See also ==
- Thirteen Buddhas
