= Thirteen Buddhist Sites of Kobe =

The Thirteen Buddhist Sites of Kobe (神戸十三仏霊場) are a group of 13 Buddhist sacred sites in Hyōgo Prefecture, Japan. The temples are dedicated to the Thirteen Buddhas, and the temple grouping was established in 1994.

== Directory ==
Number	Temple	Dedication
1.	Manpuku-ji 転法輪寺	Fudō-myōō
2.	Tenjō-ji 天上寺	Shaka Nyorai
3.	Nyoi-ji 如意寺	Monju Bosatsu
4.	Taisan-ji 太山寺	Fugen Bosatsu
5.	Shōkai-ji 性海寺	Jizō Bosatsu
6.	Tairyū-ji 大龍寺	Miroku Bosatsu
7.	Shakunu-ji 石峯寺	Yakushi Nyorai
8.	Nōfuku-ji 能福寺	Kannon Bosatsu
9.	Nenbutsu-ji 念仏寺	Seishi Bosatsu
10.	Tamon-ji 多聞寺	Amida Nyorai
11.	Suma-dera 須磨寺	Ashuku Nyorai
12.	Mudō-ji 無動寺	Dainichi Nyorai
13.	Kaburai-ji 鏑射寺	Kokūzō Bosatsu

== See also ==
- Thirteen Buddhas
