= Thirteen Buddhist Sites of Izumo =

Buddhist sacred sites in Shimane, Japan

The Thirteen Buddhist Sites of Izumo（出雲国十三仏霊場, Izumo no kuni jūsan butsu reijō）are a group of 13 Buddhist sacred sites in Shimane Prefecture, Japan. The temples are dedicated to the Thirteen Buddhas.

== Directory ==
Number	Temple	Dedication
1.	高祖寺	Fudō-myōō
2.	朝日寺	Shaka Nyorai
3.	成相寺	Monju Bosatsu
4.	満願寺	Fugen Bosatsu
5.	薬師院	Jizō Bosatsu
6.	千手院	Miroku Bosatsu
7.	自性院	Yakushi Nyorai
8.	迎接寺	Kannon Bosatsu
9.	東泉寺	Seishi Bosatsu
10.	乗光寺	Amida Nyorai
11.	弘徳寺	Ashuku Nyorai
12.	報恩寺	Dainichi Nyorai
13.	岩屋寺	Kokūzō Bosatsu

== See also ==
- Thirteen Buddhas
