= Thirteen Buddhist Sites of Kamakura =

Group of sacred sites in Kanagawa, Japan

The Thirteen Buddhist Sites of Kamakura (鎌倉十三佛霊場; Kamakura jūsan butsu reijō) are a group of 13 Buddhist sacred sites in Kanagawa Prefecture, Japan. The temples are dedicated to the Thirteen Buddhas.

== Directory ==
Number	Temple	Dedication	Address
1.	Myōō-in 明王院	Fudō-myōō	32 Juniso, Kamakura, Kanagawa
2.	Jōmyō-ji 浄妙寺	Shaka Nyorai	3-8-31 Jomyoji, Kamakura, Kanagawa
3.	Hongaku-ji 本覚寺	Monju Bosatsu	1-12-12 Komachi, Kamakura, Kanagawa
4.	Hōkoku-ji 報国寺	Fugen Bosatsu	2-7-4 Jomyoji, Kamakura, Kanagawa
5.	Ennō-ji 円応寺	Jizō Bosatsu	1543 Yamanouchi, Kamakura, Kanagawa
6.	Jōchi-ji 浄智寺	Miroku Bosatsu	1402 Yamanouchi, Kamakura, Kanagawa
7.	Kaizō-ji 海蔵寺	Yakushi Nyorai	4-18-8 Ogigayatsu, Kamakura, Kanagawa
8.	Zenkyo-in 善教院	Kannon Bosatsu	1534 Yamanouchi, Kamakura, Kanagawa
9.	Jōkōmyō-ji 浄光明寺	Seishi Bosatsu	2-12-1 Ogigayatsu, Kamakura, Kanagawa
10.	Raikō-ji 来迎寺	Amida Nyorai	2-9-19 Zaimokuza, Kamakura, Kanagawa
11.	Kakuon-ji 覚園寺	Ashuku Nyorai	421 Nikaidō, Kamakura, Kanagawa
12.	Gokuraku-ji 極楽寺	Dainichi Nyorai	3-6-7 Gokurakuji, Kamakura, Kanagawa
13.	Joju-in 常住院	Kokūzō Bosatsu	1-1-5 Gokurakuji, Kamakura, Kanagawa

== See also ==
- Thirteen Buddhas
