= Thirteen Buddhas of Anan =

The Thirteen Buddhas of Anan（阿南十三佛霊場, Anan jūsan butsu reijō）are a group of 13 Buddhist sacred sites in Tokushima Prefecture, Japan. The temples are dedicated to the Thirteen Buddhas.

== Directory ==
Number	Temple	Dedication
1.	Manpuku-ji 万福寺	Fudō-myōō
2.	Tōfuku-ji 東福寺	Shaka Nyorai
3.	Kōmyō-ji 光明寺	Monju Bosatsu
4.	Fugen-ji 普賢寺	Fugen Bosatsu
5.	Jizō-ji 地蔵寺	Jizō Bosatsu
6.	Mitsuzō-in 密蔵院	Miroku Bosatsu
7.	Senpuku-ji 千福寺	Yakushi Nyorai
8.	Myōdani-ji 明谷寺	Kannon Bosatsu
9.	Shinpuku-ji 真福寺	Seishi Bosatsu
10.	Jōdo-ji 浄土寺	Amida Nyorai
11.	Hōzō-in 宝蔵院	Ashuku Nyorai
12.	Kisshō-ji 吉祥寺	Dainichi Nyorai
13.	Baikoku-ji 梅谷寺	Kokūzō Bosatsu

== See also ==
- Thirteen Buddhas
