= Thirteen Buddhas of Awaji Island =

13 Buddhist sacred sites on Awaji Island, Hyōgo Prefecture, Japan

The Thirteen Buddhas of Awaji Island (淡路島十三仏霊場, Awajishima jūsan butsu reijō) are a group of 13 Buddhist sacred sites on Awaji Island in Hyōgo Prefecture, Japan, in the eastern part of the Seto Inland Sea between the islands of Honshū and Shikoku. They are dedicated to the Thirteen Buddhas.

== Directory ==
| Number | Temple | Dedication |
|---|---|---|
| 1. | Senkō-ji | Fudō-myōō |
| 2. | Eifuku-ji | Shaka Nyorai |
| 3. | Hōshaku-ji | Monju Bosatsu |
| 4. | Manshō-ji | Fugen Bosatsu |
| 5. | Shinkan-ji | Jizō Bosatsu |
| 6. | Kasugan-ji | Miroku Bosatsu |
| 7. | Chishaku-ji | Yakushi Nyorai |
| 8. | Sanbō-in | Kannon Bosatsu |
| 9. | Hokke-ji | Seishi Bosatsu |
| 10. | Kaifuku-ji | Amida Nyorai |
| 11. | Shofuku-ji | Ashuku Nyorai |
| 12. | Chōon-ji | Dainichi Nyorai |
| 13. | Hachiman-ji | Kokūzō Bosatsu |

== See also ==
- Thirteen Buddhas
