= Thirteen Buddhist Sites of Dewa =

The Thirteen Buddhist Sites of Dewa（出羽の国十三仏霊場, Dewa no kuni jūsan butsu reijō）are a group of 13 Buddhist sacred sites in Yamagata Prefecture, Japan. The temples are dedicated to the Thirteen Buddhas.

== Directory ==
Number	Temple	Dedication
1.	龍覚寺	Fudō-myōō
2.	法来寺	Shaka Nyorai
3.	良向寺	Monju Bosatsu
4.	天徳寺	Fugen Bosatsu
5.	定泉寺	Jizō Bosatsu
6.	弥勒院	Miroku Bosatsu
7.	薬師寺	Yakushi Nyorai
8.	若松寺	Kannon Bosatsu
9.	西光寺	Seishi Bosatsu
10.	風立寺	Amida Nyorai
11.	長念寺	Ashuku Nyorai
12.	海向寺	Dainichi Nyorai
13.	大蔵寺	Kokūzō Bosatsu

== See also ==
- Thirteen Buddhas
