= Thirteen Buddhas =

Japanese grouping of Buddhist deities

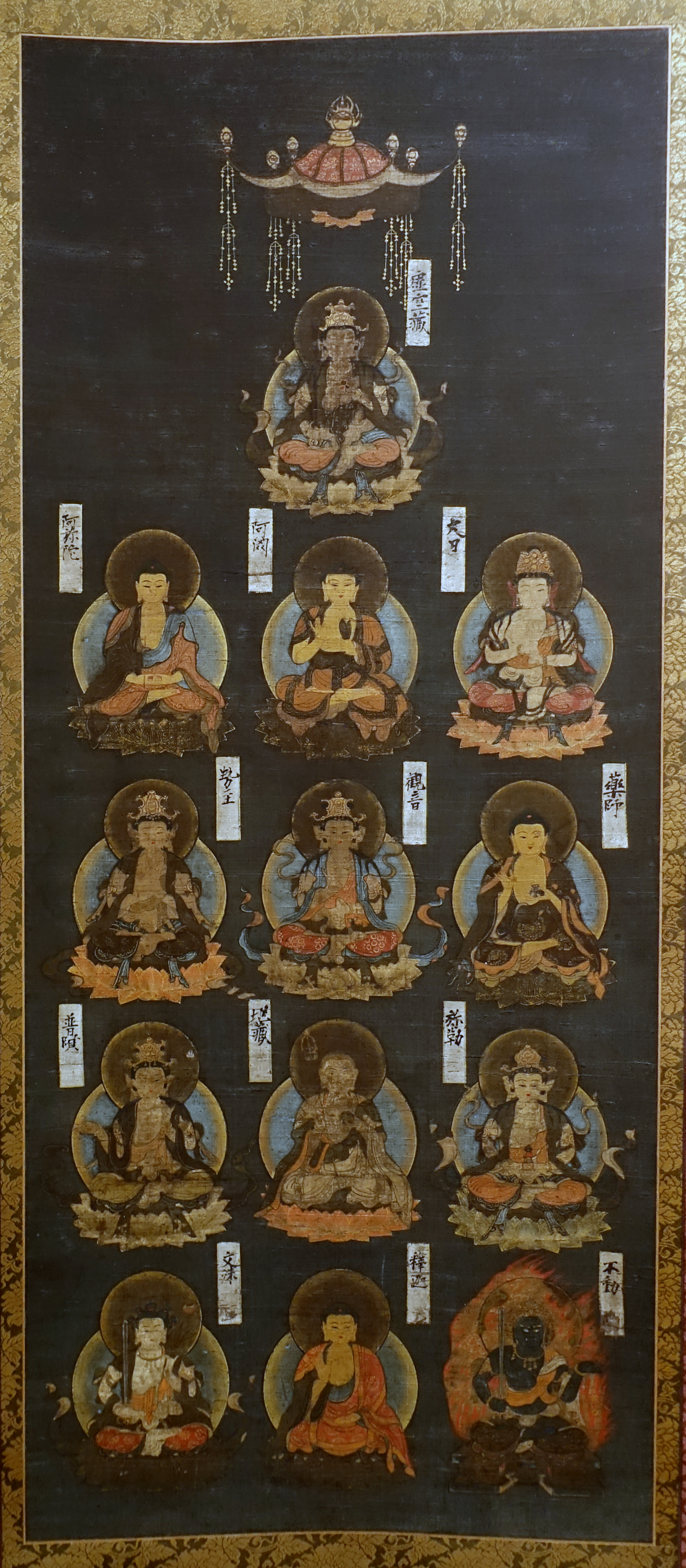
Thirteen Buddhist Deities, Japan, Nambokucho-Muromachi period, c. 1336-1568

The Thirteen Buddhas (十三仏, Jūsanbutsu) is a Japanese grouping of Buddhist deities, particularly in the Shingon and Tendai sects of Buddhism. The deities are, in fact, not only Buddhas, but also include bodhisattvas. In Shingon services, lay followers recite a devotional mantra to each figure, though in Shingon practice, disciples will typically devote themselves to only one, depending on what the teacher assigns. The chanting of the mantras of the Thirteen Buddhas is a basic practice followed by Shingon and Tendai lay followers. They are also important in funeral and apotropaic / protective rituals.

== Funeral rituals ==
The Thirteen Buddhas are also an important part of a traditional Japanese Buddhist funeral service, with each deity having a corresponding memorial service for the deceased. The names of the thirteen figures are given below in Japanese and Sanskrit and the corresponding date of their service after the death:

1. Fudō (Acala), 7th day
2. Shaka (Sakyamuni), 14th day
3. Monju (Manjushri), 21st day
4. Fugen (Samantabhadra), 28th day
5. Jizō (Ksitigarbha), 35th day
6. Miroku (Maitreya), 42nd day
7. Yakushi (Bhaisajyaguru), 49th day
8. Kannon (Avalokitesvara), 100th day
9. Seishi (Mahasthamaprapta), 1st anniversary
10. Amida (Amitabha), 2nd anniversary
11. Ashuku (Akshobhya), 6th anniversary
12. Dainichi (Vairocana), 12th anniversary
13. Kokūzō (Akasagarbha), 32nd anniversary

== Mantras ==
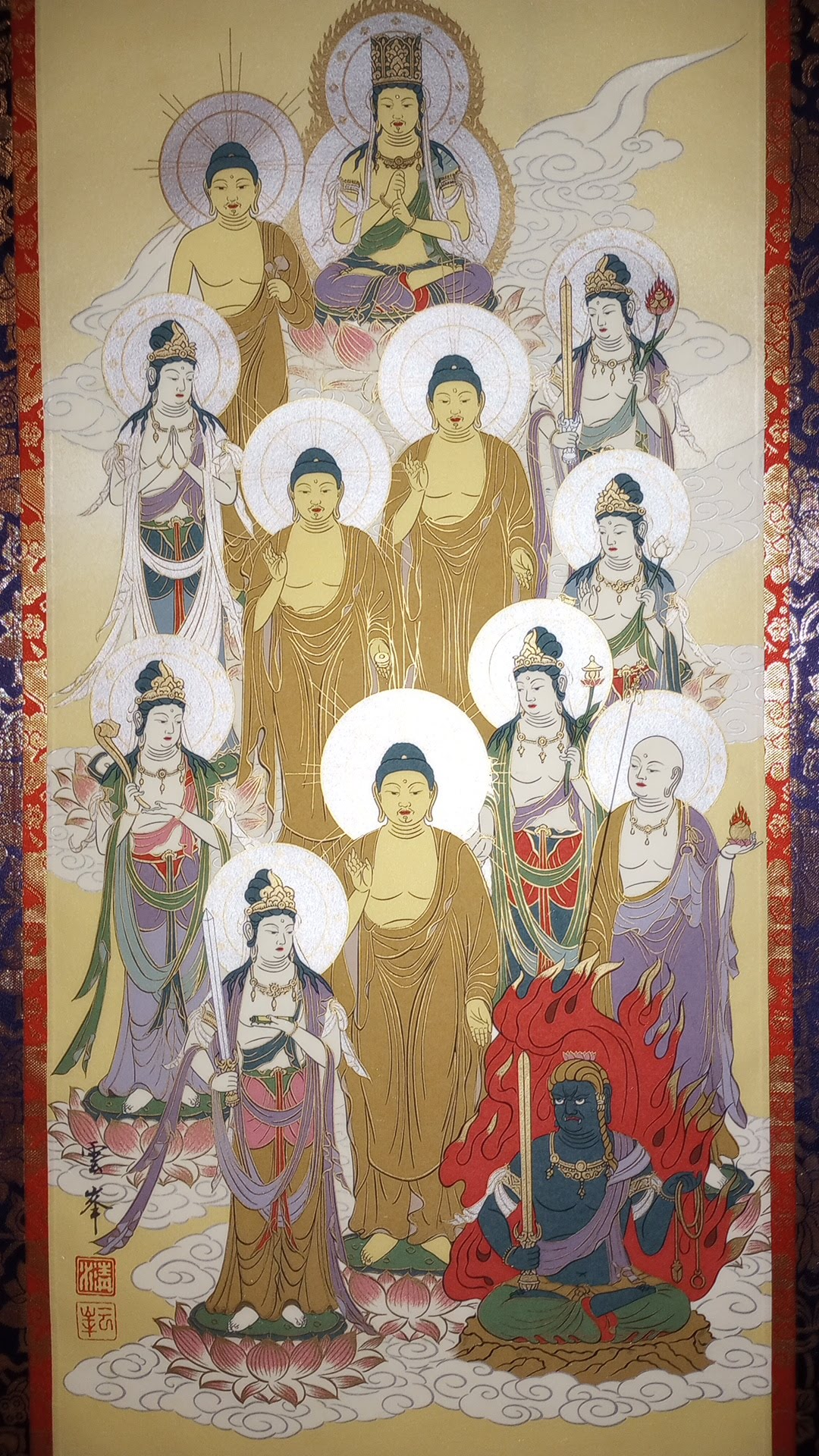
A modern depiction of the thirteen Buddhas in a Japanese hanging scroll (kakejiku)

While the thirteen figures have several mantras associated to each respectively, those listed below pertain to the standard formula used in Japanese ritual. The Shingon and Tendai schools each use a different method of transliteration of the original Sanskrit. Bhaisajyaguru is the only figure whose mantra fundamentally differs between traditions.

1. Fudōmyōō (不動明王, Acala):
  (Sanskrit) namaḥ samanta vajrāṇāṃ caṇḍa mahāroṣaṇa sphoṭaya hūṃ traṭ hāṃ māṃ
  (Shingon) nōmaku sanmanda bazara dan senda makaroshada sowataya un tarata kanman
  (ノウマク・サンマンダ・バザラダン・センダマカロシャダ・ソワタヤ・ウン・タラタ・カン・マン)
  (Tendai) namaku samanda bazaranan senda makaroshana sowataya un tarata kanman
  (ナマク・サマンダ・バサラナン・センダ・マカロシャナ・ソワタヤ・ウン・タラタ・カンマン)
2. Shaka nyorai (釈迦如来, Sakyamuni):
  (Sanskrit) namaḥ samanta buddhānāṃ bhaḥ
  (Shingon) nōmaku sanmanda bodanan baku (ノウマク・サンマンダ・ボダナン・バク)
  (Tendai) namaku samanda bodanan ba (ナマク・サマンダ・ボダナン・バ)
3. Monju bosatsu (文殊菩薩, Manjushri):
  (Sanskrit) oṃ a ra pa ca na
  (Shingon) on arahashanō (オン・アラハシャノウ)
  (Tendai) on a ra ha sha na (オン・ア・ラ・ハ・シャ・ナ)
4. Fugen bosatsu (普賢菩薩, Samantabhadra):
  (Sanskrit) oṃ samayas tvaṃ
  (Shingon) on sanmaya satoban (オン・サンマヤ・サトバン)
  (Tendai) on samaya sataban (オン・サマヤ・サタバン)
5. Jizō bosatsu (地蔵菩薩, Ksitigarbha):
  (Sanskrit) oṃ ha ha ha vismaye svāhā
  (Shingon) on kakaka bisanmaei sowaka (オン・カカカ・ビサンマエイ・ソワカ)
  (Tendai) on kakakabi samaei sowaka (オン・カカカビ・サマエイ・ソワカ)
6. Miroku bosatsu (弥勒菩薩, Maitreya):
  (Sanskrit) oṃ maitreya svāhā
  (Shingon) on maitareiya sowaka (オン・マイタレイヤ・ソワカ)
  (Tendai) on maitariya sowaka (オン・マイタリヤ・ソワカ)
7. Yakushi nyorai (薬師如来, Bhaisajyaguru):
  (Sanskrit) oṃ huru huru caṇḍāli mātangi svāhā
  (Shingon) on korokoro sendari matōgi sowaka (オン・コロコロ・センダリ・マトウギ・ソワカ)
  (Sanskrit) oṃ bhaiṣajye bhaiṣajye bhaiṣajya samudgate svāhā
  (Tendai) on baiseizeibaiseizei baiseijasanborgyatei sowaka (オン・バイセイゼイバイセイゼイ・バイセイジャサンボリギャテイ・ソワカ
8. Kanzeon bosatsu (観世音菩薩, Avalokitesvara):
  (Sanskrit) oṃ ārolik svāhā
  (Shingon) on arorikya sowaka (オン・アロリキャ・ソワカ)
  (Tendai) on arorikya sowaka (オン・アロリキャ・ソワカ)
9. Seishi bosatsu (勢至菩薩, Mahasthamaprapta):
  (Sanskrit) oṃ saṃ jaṃ jaṃ saḥ svāhā
  (Shingon) on san zan saku sowaka (オン・サン・ザン・サク・ソワカ)
  (Tendai) on sanzen zensaku sowaka (オン・サンゼン・ゼンサク・ソワカ)
10. Amida nyorai (阿弥陀如来, Amitabha):
  (Sanskrit) oṃ amṛta teje hara hūṃ
  (Shingon) on amirita teisei kara un (オン・アミリタ・テイセイ・カラ・ウン)
  (Tendai) on amirita teisei kara un (オン・アミリタ・テイセイ・カラ・ウン)
11. Ashuku nyorai (阿閦如来, Akshobhya):
  (Sanskrit) oṃ akṣobhya hūṃ
  (Shingon) on akishubiya un (オン・アキシュビヤ・ウン)
  (Tendai) on akishubiya un (オン・アキシュビヤ・ウン)
12. Dainichi nyorai (大日如来, Vairocana):
  (Sanskrit) oṃ a vi ra hūṃ khaṃ vajradhātu vaṃ
  (Shingon) on abiraunken basara datoban (オン・アビラウンケン・バサラ・ダトバン)
  (Tendai) on abiraunken basara datoban (オン・アビラウンケン・バサラ・ダトバン)
13. Kokūzō bosatsu (虚空蔵菩薩, Akashagarbha):
  (Sanskrit) namo ākāśagarbhāya oṃ ārya kāmāri mauli svāhā
  (Shingon) nōbō akyashakyarabaya on arikya mari bori sowaka (ノウボウ・アキャシャキャラバヤ・オン・アリキャ・マリ・ボリ・ソワカ)
  (Tendai) namo akyashagerubaya onarikya maribori sowaka (ナモ・アキャシャゲルバヤ・オンアリキャ・マリボリ・ソワカ)

== Zodiac ==
Eight of the thirteen figures are traditionally assigned as guardians of the twelve Earthly Branches of the Chinese zodiac.

Earthly branch	Guardian
Rat	Kannon (Avalokitesvara)
Ox	Kokuzo (Akasagarbha)
Tiger	Kokuzo (Akasagarbha)
Rabbit	Monju (Manjushri)
Dragon	Fugen (Samantabhadra)
Snake	Fugen (Samantabhadra)
Horse	Seishi (Mahasthamaprapta)
Goat	Dainichi (Vairocana)
Monkey	Dainichi (Vairocana)
Rooster	Fudo (Acala)
Dog	Amida (Amitabha)
Pig	Amida (Amitabha)

== See also ==
- Thirteen Buddhas of Anan
- Thirteen Buddhas of Awaji Island
- Thirteen Buddhas of Chichibu
- Thirteen Buddhist Sites of Dewa
- Thirteen Buddhas of Hokkaido
- Thirteen Buddhist Sites of Iyo
- Thirteen Buddhist Sites of Izumo
- Thirteen Buddhist Sites of Kamakura
- Thirteen Buddhist Sites of Kobe
- Thirteen Buddhist Sites of Kyoto
- Thirteen Buddhist Sites of Musashi
- Thirteen Buddhist Sites of Osaka
- Thirteen Buddhas of Tama
- Thirteen Buddhist Sites of Yamagata
- Thirteen Buddhist Sites of Yamato
