= Mahāsattva =

Buddhist practitioner

A mahāsattva (lit. 'great being') is a great bodhisattva who has practiced Buddhism for a long time and reached a very high level on the path to awakening (bodhi). Generally refers to bodhisattvas who have reached at least the seventh of the ten bhumis. The transcription of mahāsattva in Chinese is móhé-sāduò (摩訶薩埵), often simplified in móhésà (摩訶薩/大菩薩, Japanese: makasatsu). It is also calqued as dàshì (大士, "great being", Japanese: daishi).

The eight most famous mahāsattvas are Mañjuśrī, Samantabhadra, Avalokiteśvara, Mahāsthāmaprāpta, Akasagarbha, Kṣitigarbha, Maitreya and Sarvanivarana-Vishkambhin.
