= Sarvanivāraṇaviṣkambhin =

Sarvanīvaraṇaviṣkambhin
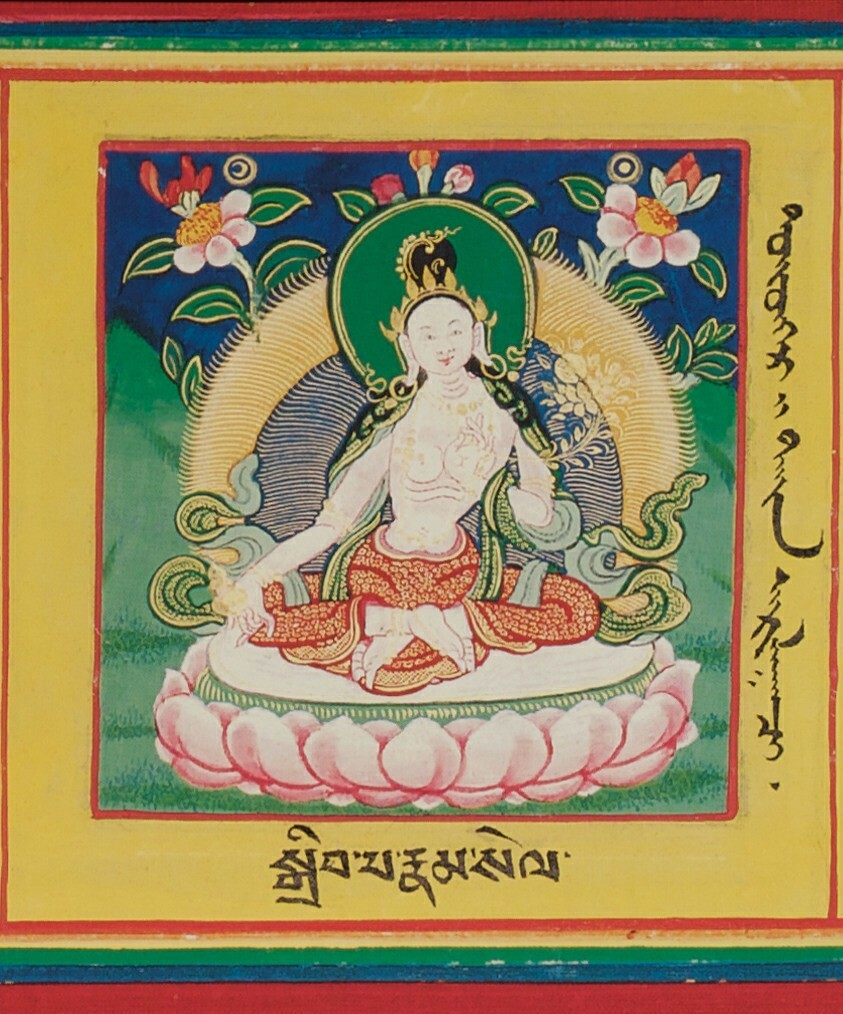
- Sanskrit: सर्वनिवारणविष्कम्भिन् Sarvanivāraṇaviṣkambhin
- Chinese: (Traditional) 除蓋障菩薩 (Simplified) 除盖障菩萨 (Pinyin: Chúgàizhàng Púsà) (Traditional) 凈諸業障菩薩 (Simplified) 净诸业障菩萨 (Pinyin: Jìngzhūyèzhàng Púsà)
- Japanese: 除蓋障菩薩(じょがいしょうぼさつ) (romaji: Jogaishō Bosatsu)
- Korean: 정제업장보살 (RR: Jeongje'eobjang Bosal) 제개장보살 (RR: Jegaejang Bosal)
- Tibetan: སྒྲིབ་པ་རྣམ་སེལ་ Wylie: sgrib pa rnam sel THL: dribpa nam sel
- Vietnamese: Trừ Cái Chướng Bồ Tát

Information
- Venerated by: Mahāyāna, Vajrayāna

Sarvanīvaraṇaviṣkambhin is a bodhisattva revered in Mahāyāna Buddhism. He is one of the Eight Great Bodhisattvas with Mañjuśrī, Samantabhadra, Avalokiteśvara, Mahāsthāmaprāpta, Ākāśagarbha, Kṣitigarbha and Maitreya. His name means "He who blocks (viṣkambhin) all of the hindrances (sarva nivāraṇa)."

== Role ==
He is invoked to remove or eliminate all the obstacles to insure a successful meditation.

== Nivāraṇa ==
Although the eight Mahāsattvas belong to the current Mahāyāna, the term nivāraṇa is most commonly used in the Theravada texts where it refers to the five mental obstacles: desire (kamacchanda), hostility (vyapada), laziness (thinamiddha), distraction and worry (uddhachcha-kukuchcha), doubts (vichikicha) towards the Three Jewels. Sarvanivāraṇaviṣkambhi is best known to meditators and is not an important subject to individual worship like the other seven mahāsattvas. In terms of the name of the bodhisattva himself, the word is most often spelt in the irregular form nīvaraṇa.

== In Vajrayāna ==
In Tantric Buddhism, he is usually placed in the lineage of Amoghasiddhi Buddha, one of the five Dhyani Buddhas, more rarely of Akshobhya Buddha. He is sometimes considered a form of Vajrapāṇi, though this is most likely a confusion with the mahāsattva Mahāsthāmāprāpta which Vajrapāṇi is one of its incarnations.

== Iconography ==
In iconography, he has often a flower in one hand, sometimes with a wishing gem (cintāmaṇi).

== Sutras concerned ==
He is mentioned in the Lotus Sutra, in which he pays homage to Avalokiteśvara, and in the Mahavairocana Tantra. He is also the main interlocutor in Ratnamegha and Tathāgata-guṇa-jñānācintya-viṣayāvatāra-nirdeśa sutras.

== Mantra ==
The mantra of this great bodhisattva to remove all obstacles and disturbances mentioned in the Vairocanābhisaṃbodhi Sūtra is as follows:

namaḥ samantabuddhānāṃ/ aḥ/ sattva hitābhyudgata/ traṃ/ traṃ/ raṃ/ raṃ/ svāhā

In the Dharanisamgraha (Collected Dharanis), the bodhisattva's spell is:

om̐ namaḥ sarvanivaraṇaviṣkambhine bodhisattvāya mahāsattvāya/ tadyathā/ om̐ sarvanivaraṇa-viṣkambhine sarvapāpāvaraṇaṁ viśodhaya 2 hūm̐ phaṭ svāhā
