= Nōfuku-ji =

Buddhist temple in Kobe, Japan

Coordinates: 34.668220°N 135.171392°E

Nōfuku-ji 能福寺
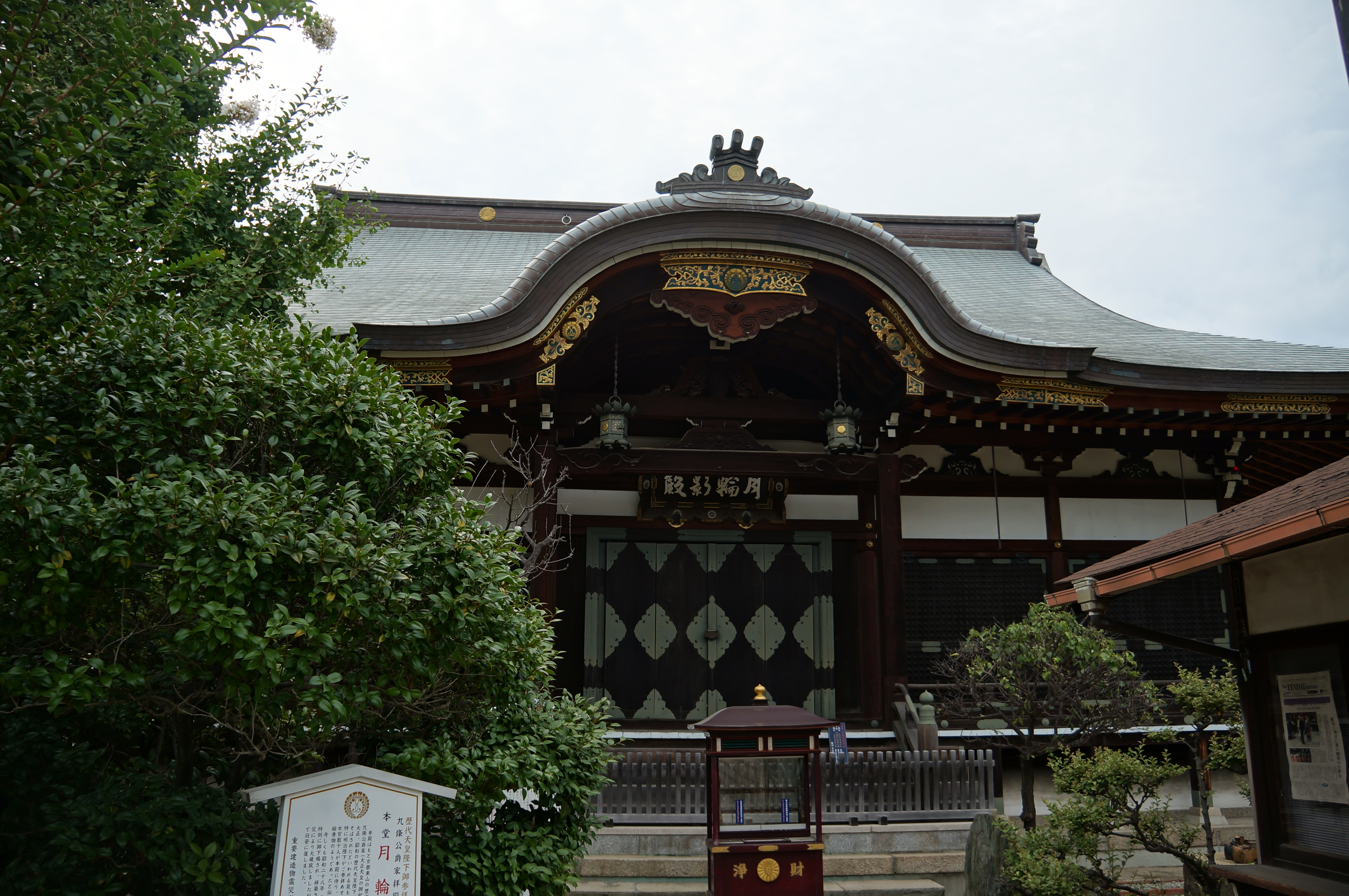
- Nōfuku-ji's new honden named Tsukinowa-eiden

Religion
- Affiliation: Tendai
- Deity: Yakushi Nyorai

Location
- Location: 1 Kita Sakasegawa-chō, Hyōgo-ku, Kobe, Kobe, Hyōgo Prefecture
- Country: Japan
- Interactive map of Nōfuku-ji 能福寺

Architecture
- Founder: Saichō
- Completed: 805

Nōfuku-ji (能福寺) is a Buddhist temple that, from the legend, was founded in 805 by the monk Saichō, in Kita Sakasegawa, Hyōgo-ku, Kobe, Hyōgo Prefecture, Japan. Saichō (of the Tendai sect) placed a statue of Yakushi Nyorai of his own making in the temple hall and named the temple Nōfuku Gokoku Mitsu-ji (能福護国密寺).

This temple served as a branch temple of Kyoto's Shōren-in from the early Edo period to the beginning of the Meiji period.

The Shin-saigoku Pilgrimage (新西国三十三箇所観音霊場) (a Buddhist pilgrimage route in Japan) includes this temple as one of the stops.

== Main building ==
Any remains of Nōfuku-ji were vanished, and now replaced by Tsukinowa-eiden (月輪影殿) main hall, which was built in 1953. It was damaged during the Great Hanshin earthquake in 1995, and reconstructed in 1997.

== Hyōgo Daibutsu ==
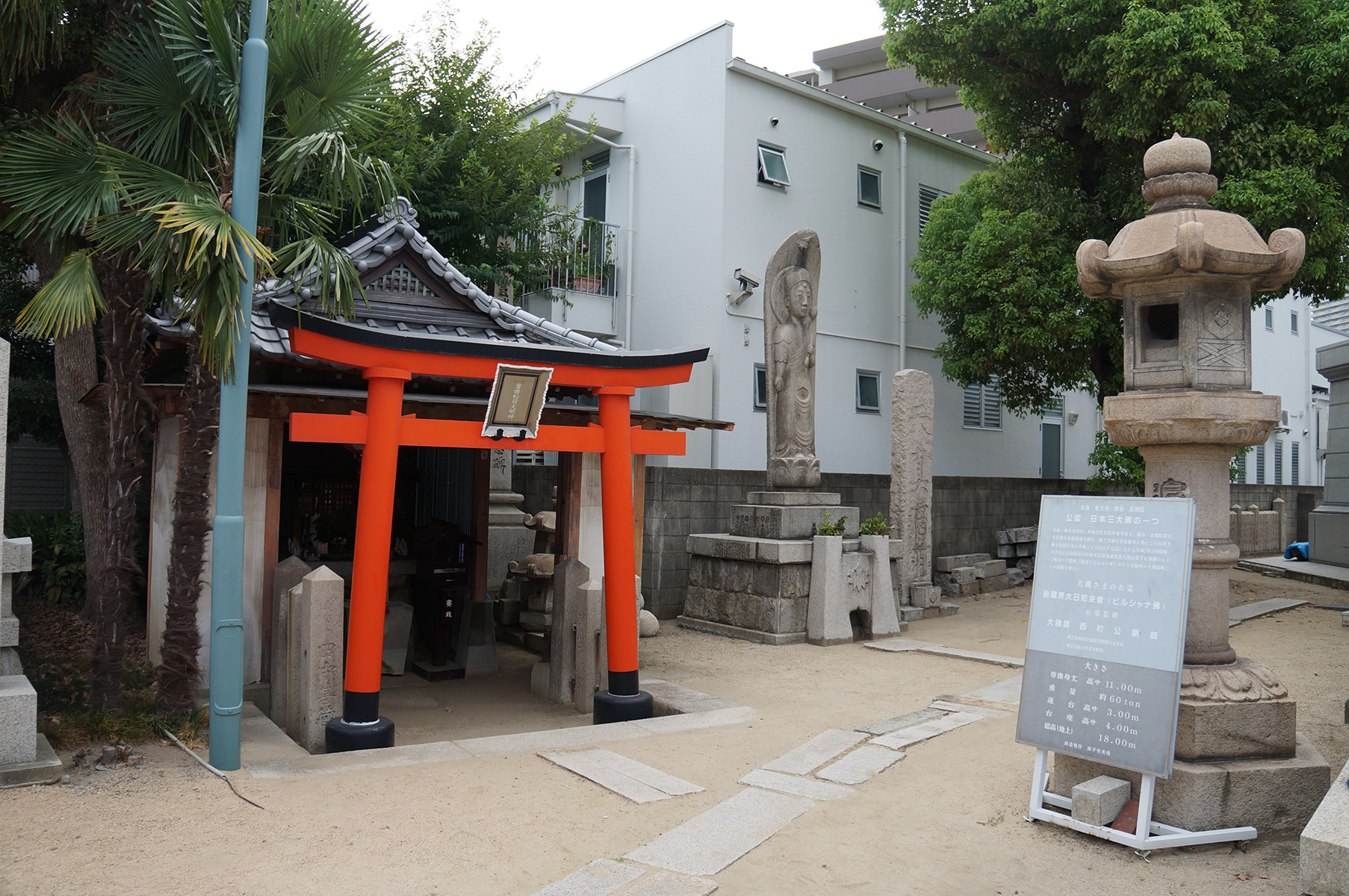
Private Tōshō Inari-Daimyōjin (當勝稲荷大明神) Shinto shrine besides Hyōgo Daibutsu

Hyōgo Daibutsu (兵庫大仏) was a statue of Buddha in Hyōgo Prefecture which originally was built in 1891 on donation of a wealthy merchant, and was 3rd biggest Buddha statue in Japan. A photo of it is held by the Metropolitan Museum of Art. Melted down in 1944 for the Metals recovery ordinance and was replaced in 1991 by new statue. Current statue have size of 11 meters (18 meters with pedestal), 60 tons weight. The eye-opening ceremony (Kaigen-kuyō (開眼供養)) was held in May, 1991.

== See also ==
- Thirteen Buddhist Sites of Kobe
- Buddhist temples in Japan
- Glossary of Japanese Buddhism
- Tourism in Japan
