= Trāṇamukta =

Bodhisattva

Trāṇamukta (Tibetan: སྐྱབས་གྲོལ།) is a Bodhisattva that appears toward the end of the Bhaiṣajyaguruvaiḍūryaprabharāja Sūtra, the Mahāyāna text of the Medicine Buddha or Bhaisajyaguru. In translations into English from the Chinese version of the text, his name has been rendered "Saving Deliverance" and "Salvation".
