= Gallipot =

Small jar

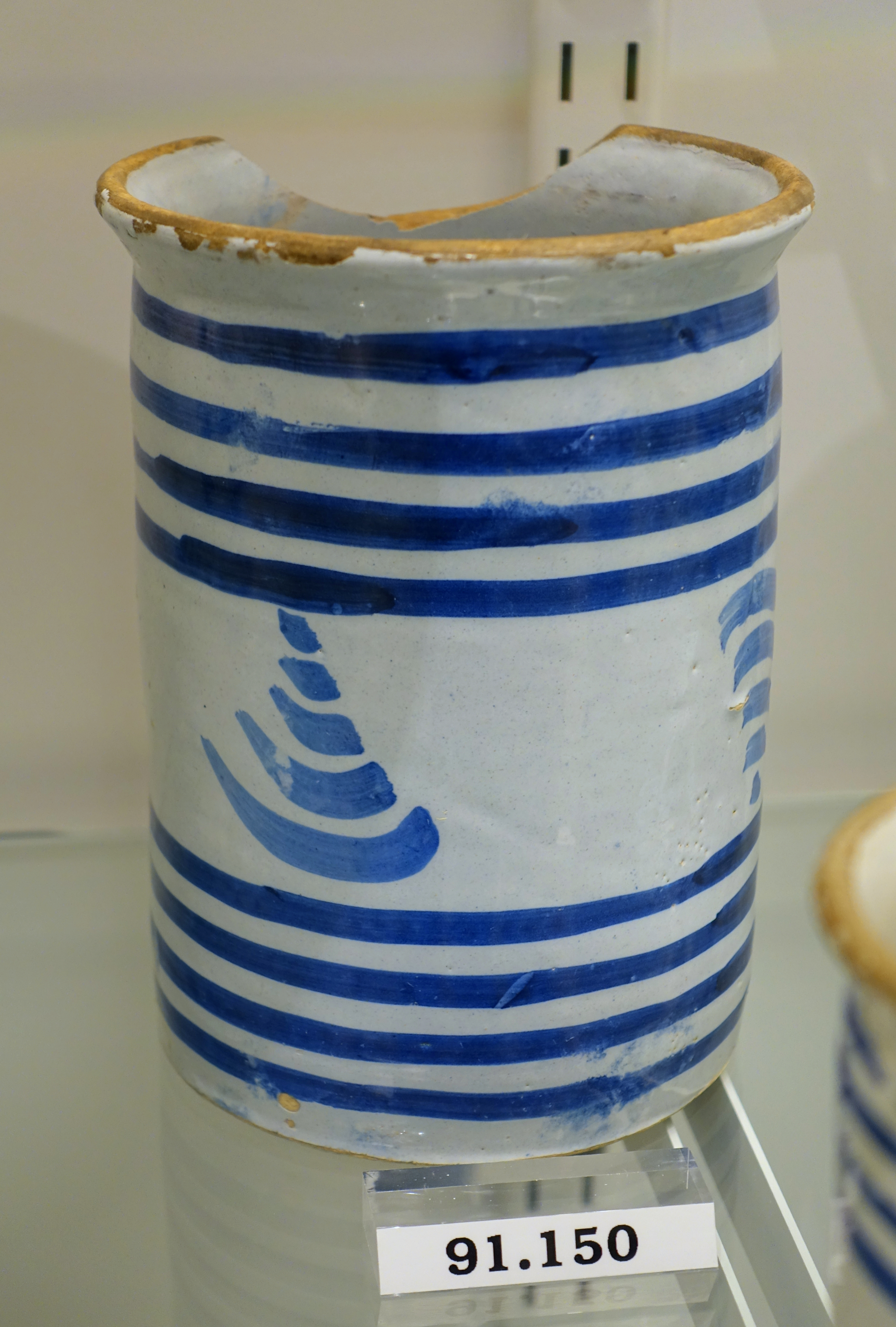
c. 1760, an English tin-glazed earthenware gallipot

A gallipot is a small jar, traditionally of glazed earthenware, used by apothecaries for holding ointment or medicine. In the 21st century, gallipots are available in plastic as well.

The term gallipot, recorded from the 15th century, may derive from the idea of pots originally imported in galleys, and has also been used for small pots used for other purposes – such as preparing an individual portion of custard or melting wax while making fishing flies.

The 16th-century Gallipot Inn in Hartfield, Sussex, England, is said to take its name "from the small glazed earthenware pots made to contain medicines and ointments that were once produced on-site".

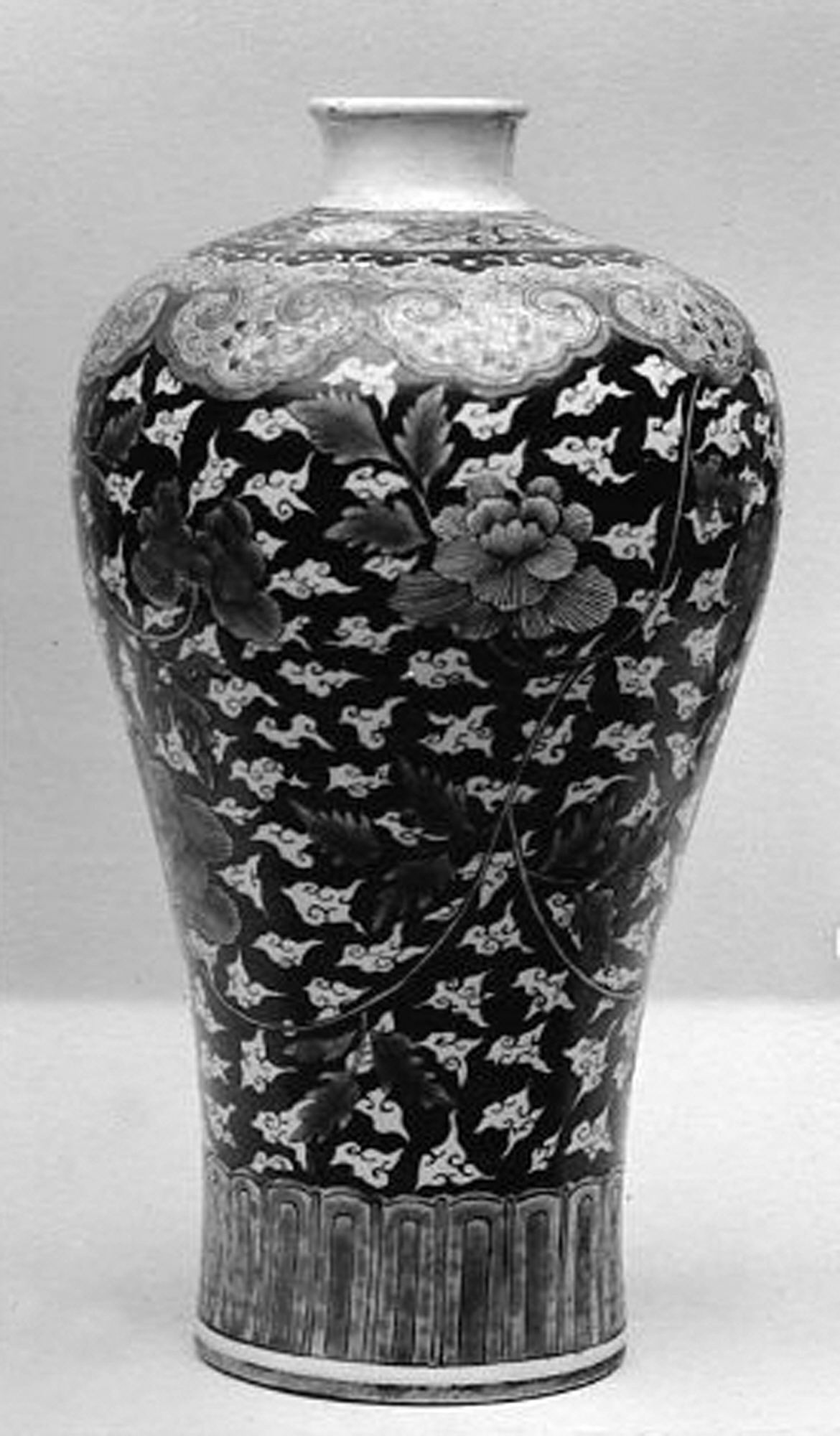
Kangxi period (1662–1722) Chinese porcelain gallipot in the Metropolitan Museum of Art

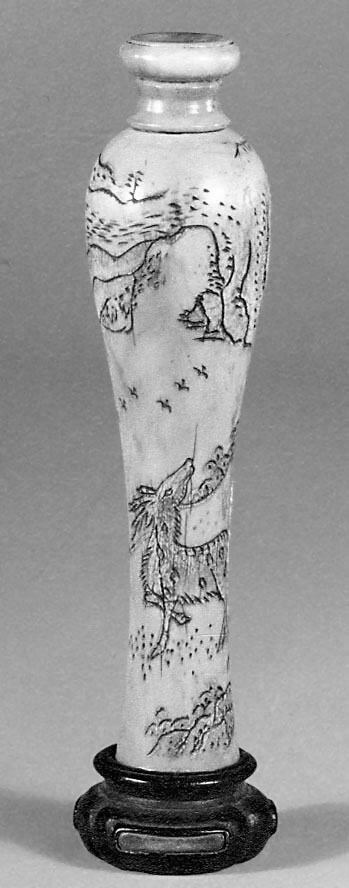
18th-century Chinese ivory gallipot in the Metropolitan Museum of Art

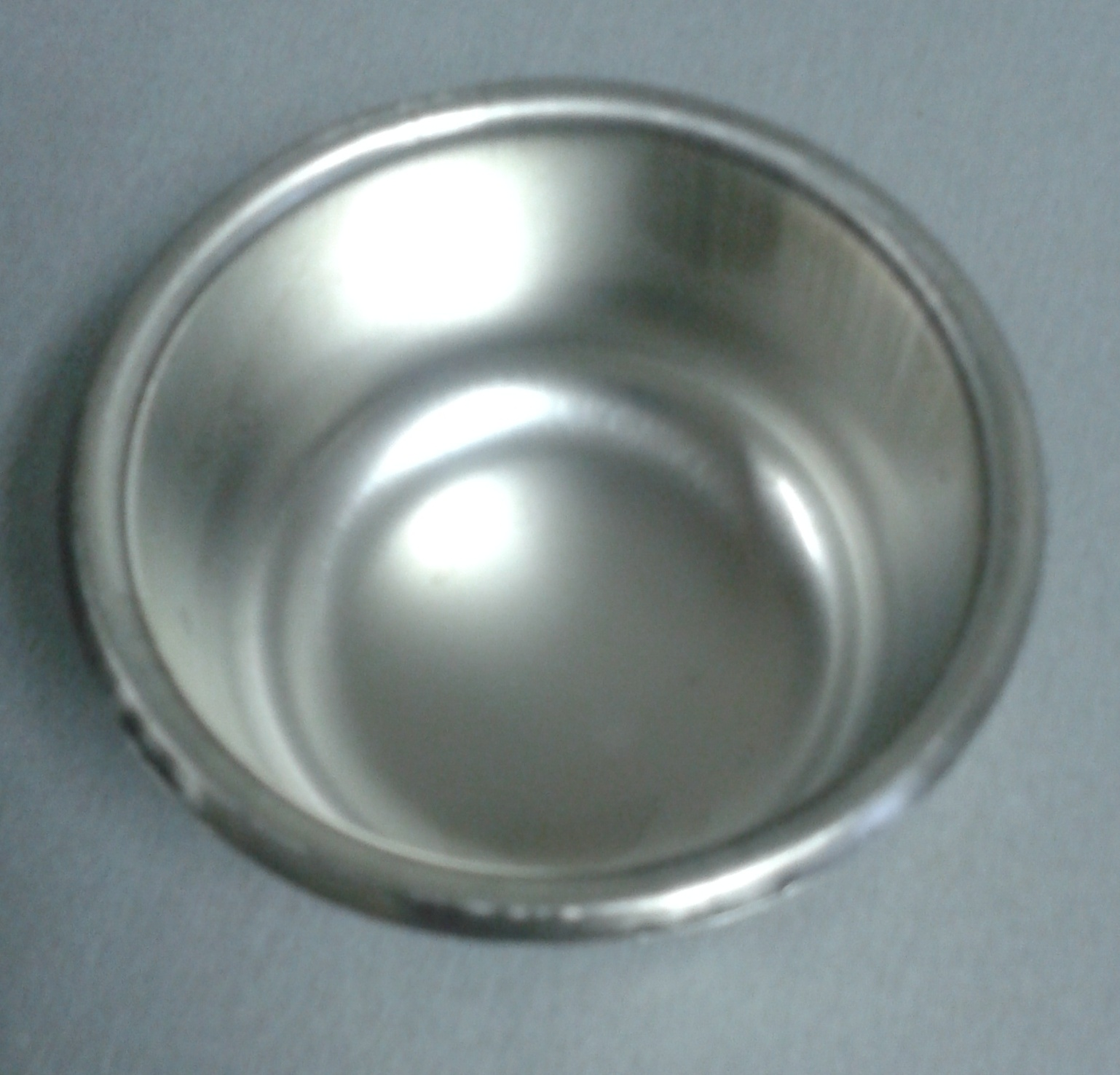
Top view of a modern gallipot
