= Mahasthamaprapta =

Bodhisattva in Mahayana Buddhism

Mahāsthāmaprāpta
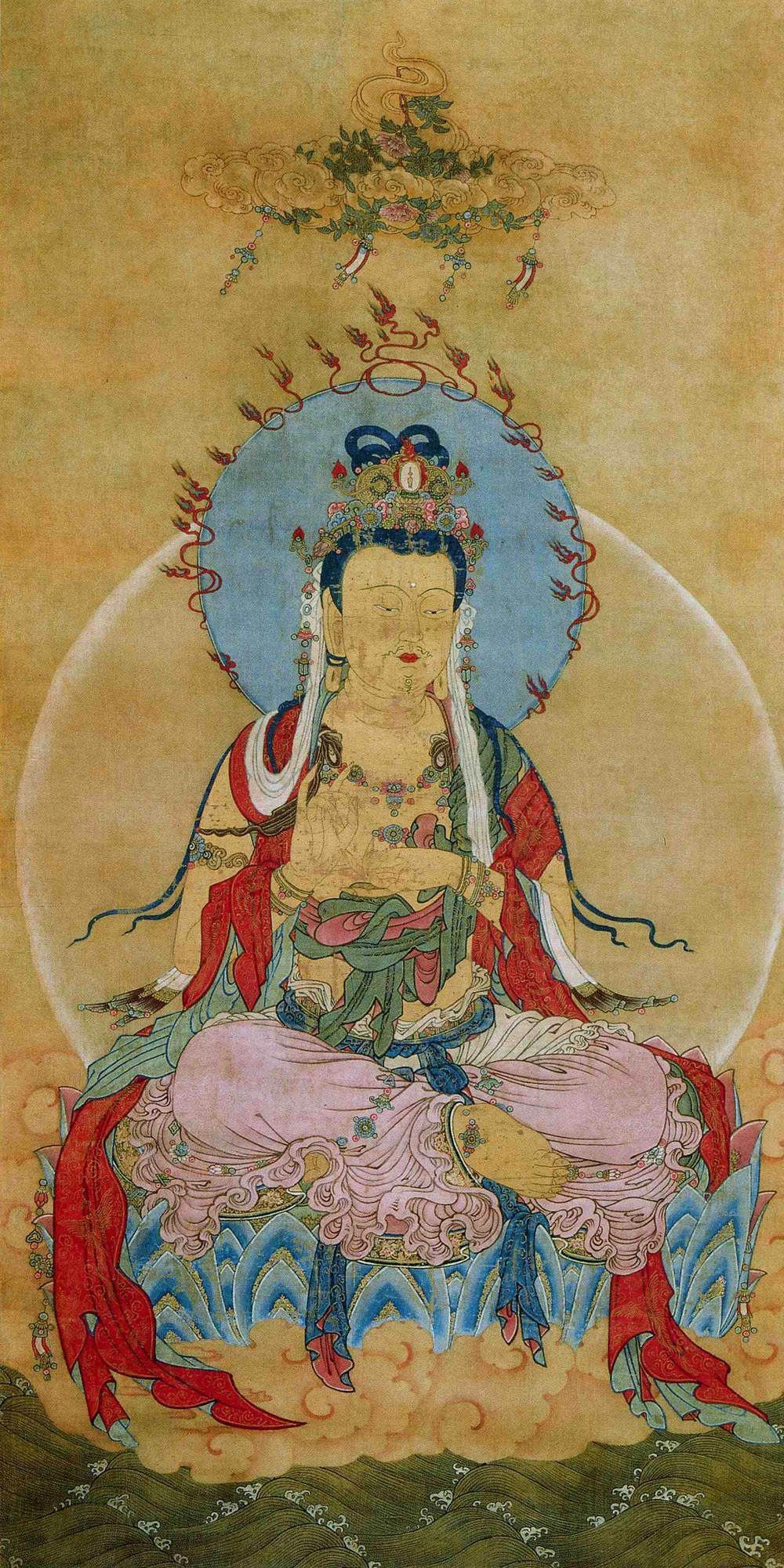
- Silk painting of Dashizhi from Khara-Khoto. Western Xia dynasty, 13th century.
- Sanskrit: महास्थामप्राप्त; Mahāsthāmaprāpta
- Chinese: (Traditional) 大勢至菩薩 or 得大勢菩薩 (Simplified) 大势至菩萨 or 得大势菩萨 (Pinyin: Dàshìzhì Púsa or Dédàshì Púsà)
- Japanese: 大勢至菩薩(だいせいしぼさつ) (romaji: Daiseishi Bosatsu)
- Khmer: មហាស្ថាមប្រាប្ត (mo-haa-sthaam-praap)
- Korean: 대세지 보살 (RR: Daeseji Bosal)
- Tagalog: Mahasthamaplapta
- Thai: พระมหาสถามปราปต์โพธิสัตว์
- Tibetan: མཐུ་ཆེན་ཐོབ; Wylie: mthu chen thob THL: Tuchen tob
- Vietnamese: Đại Thế Chí Bồ tát

Information
- Venerated by: Mahāyāna, Vajrayāna: (Amitāyurdhyāna Sūtra); (Longer Sukhāvatīvyūha Sūtra); (Lotus Sutra); (Śūraṅgama Sūtra)
- Attributes: Wisdom, Power

Mahāsthāmaprāpta is a Bodhisattva Mahāsattva who represents the power of wisdom. His name literally means "arrival of the great strength".

Mahāsthāmaprāpta is one of the Eight Great Bodhisattvas in Mahayana Buddhism, along with Mañjuśrī, Samantabhadra, Avalokiteśvara, Ākāśagarbha, Kṣitigarbha, Maitreya and Sarvanivarana-Vishkambhin.

In Chinese Buddhism, Mahasthamaprapta is sometimes portrayed as a woman, Dashizhi, with a likeness similar to Avalokiteśvara (known as Guanyin in China). He is also one of the Thirteen Buddhas in the Japanese school of Shingon Buddhism. In Tibetan Buddhism, Mahāsthāmaprāpta is equated with Vajrapani, who is one of his incarnations and was known as the Protector of Gautama Buddha.

Mahāsthāmaprāpta is one of the oldest bodhisattvas and is regarded as powerful, especially in the Pure Land school, where he takes an important role in the Longer Sukhāvatīvyūha Sūtra. He is often depicted in a trinity with Amitābha and Avalokiteśvara (Guanyin), especially in Pure Land Buddhism.

== China ==
In Chinese Buddhism, Mahāsthāmaprāpta is known as Dashizhi (Chinese: 大勢至, "Arrival of Great Strength"), and is especially associated with the Pure Land tradition as one of Amitabha's assistant Bodhisattvas. Shi Yinguang (Chinese: 印光), the Thirteenth Patriarch of Chinese Pure Land Buddhism, was widely considered to be a manifestation of Dashizhi based on the accounts of two people:
1. Yang Xinfeng (Chinese: 楊信芳), a student who had never heard of either Dashizhi or Yinguang
2. Benkong (Chinese: 本空), a former Christian who later converted to Buddhism and became a bhikkhunī
Both of these figures had independent dreams regarding the situation.

== Japan ==
In Japanese Buddhism, Mahāsthāmaprāpta is known as Daiseishi (Japanese: 大勢至, "Arrival of Great Strength") and is associated with the temple guardians Kongō Rikishi. Daiseishi is one of 25 bodhisattvas who descend from heaven (raigō) with Amitabha to welcome dying souls into Sukhavati.

Raigō of Amida and Twenty-five Attendants, a silk scroll from the 14th century which depicts raigō. Daiseishi can be seen amongst the 25 bodhisattvas accompanying Amitabha.

Daiseishi is also the guardian of those born in the Year of the Horse.

Daiseishi is one of the Thirteen Buddhas and oversees the ceremony held on the first year anniversary of a person's death.

It is theorised that Honen was an incarnation of Daiseishi. Honen was known as Seishimaru during his childhood, and was also known as "Hōnen-bō, foremost in wisdom". After his death, one of his pupils, Shinran, composed the "Hymn of Great Seishi Bodhisattva" and at the end stated, "Great Seishi Bodhisattva is the original form of Genkū Shōnin (Hōnen)."

== In the sutras ==
Mahāsthāmaprāpta is mentioned in several major Mahayana and East Asian Buddhist sutras.

In the Śūraṅgama Sūtra, Mahāsthāmaprāpta tells of how he gained enlightenment through the practice of nianfo, or continuous pure mindfulness of Amitābha, to obtain samādhi.

In the Amitayurdhyana Sutra, Mahāsthāmaprāpta is symbolized by the moon while Avalokiteśvara is represented by the sun.

In the Introductory chapter of the Lotus Sutra, Mahāsthāmaprāpta is present among the 80,000 bodhisattva mahāsattvas who assemble on Mount Gṛdhrakūṭa to hear the Shakyamuni Buddha's preaching of the Wonderful Dharma of the Lotus Flower Sutra. The Buddha also addresses Mahāsthāmaprāpta in chapter 20 of the Lotus Sutra to tell of the Buddha's past life as the Bodhisattva Sadāparibhūta ("Never Despising"), a monk who was abused and reviled by arrogant monks, nuns, laymen, and laywomen when he paid them respect by saying they would all become Buddhas. The Buddha explains to Mahāsthāmaprāpta how these arrogant people were punished, but are now bodhisattvas present in the assembly on the path to Enlightenment.

The Buddha then praises the great strength of the Lotus Sutra:

"O Mahāsthāmaprāpta, know that this Lotus Sutra will greatly benefit the bodhisattva mahāsattvas and lead them to highest, complete enlightenment. For this reason, after the Tathāgata’s parinirvāṇa the bodhisattva mahāsattvas should always preserve, recite, explain, and copy this sutra."

== Mantra ==
- Sanskrit: Namaḥ samantabuddhānāṃ, jaṃ jaṃ saḥ svāhā
- Chinese: Ǎn sàn rán rán suōpóhē (唵・散・髯・髯・娑婆訶)
- Japanese:
  - Shingon Buddhism: On san zan saku sowaka (オン・サン・ザン・サク・ソワカ)
  - Tendai Buddhism: On sanzen zensaku sowaka (オン・サンゼン・ゼンサク・ソワカ)
- English: Om may defilements be removed svâhâ (Note: Svâhâ does not have a direct English translation and is often translated as either "well said" or "so be it".)

== Bibliography ==
- Getty, Alice (1914). The gods of northern Buddhism, their history, iconography, and progressive evolution through the northern Buddhist countries, Oxford: The Clarendon press, p. 100.
