= Bhaisajyaguru =

Buddha of healing and medicine in Mahāyāna Buddhism

Bhaiṣajyaguru
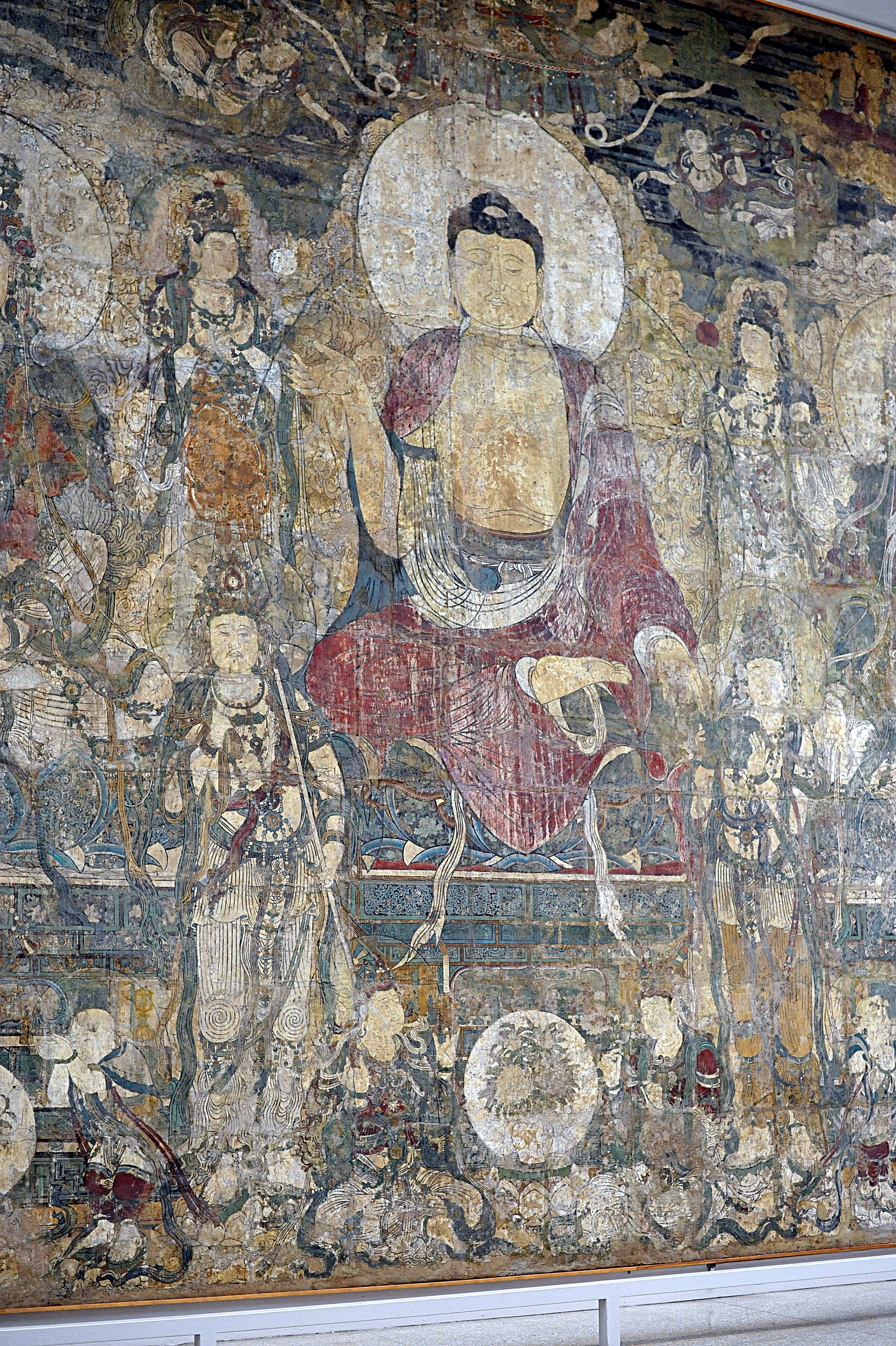
- Yuan dynasty mural of Bhaiṣajyaguru's eastern pure land
- Sanskrit: भैषज्यगुरु Bhaiṣajyaguru भैषज्यगुरुवैडूर्यप्रभराज; Bhaiṣajyaguru-vaiḍūryaprabharāja
- Burmese: ဘဲၑဇျဂုရု ဝဲဍူရ်္ယာပြဘာရာဇာ။ ဘေသဇ္ဇဂုရု ဝေဠုရိယာ ပဘာရာဇာ
- Chinese: 藥師佛 (Pinyin: Yàoshīfó) 藥師如來 (Pinyin: Yàoshī Rúlái)
- Japanese: 薬師如来(やくしにょらい) (romaji: Yakushi Nyorai) 薬師瑠璃光如来(やくしるりこうにょらい) (romaji: Yakushirurikō Nyorai)
- Khmer: ភៃសជ្យគុរុ (phei-sach-kuru)
- Korean: 약사여래 (RR: Yagsa Yeorae) 약사유리광여래 (RR: Yagsayurigwang Yeorae)
- Mongolian: Оточ Манла
- Russian: Будда Медицины
- Thai: พระไภษัชยคุรุไวฑูรยประภาตถาคต; Phra Phaisatchaya Khuru Waidun Prapha Tathakhot
- Tibetan: སངས་རྒྱས་སྨན་བླ་ Wylie: sangs rgyas sman bla THL: Sangyé Menla
- Vietnamese: Dược Sư Phật; Dược Sư Lưu Ly Quang Vương Phật; Dược Sư Lưu Ly Quang Vương Như Lai; Đại Y Vương Phật; Tiêu Tai Diên Thọ Dược Sư Phật

Information
- Venerated by: Mahayana, Vajrayana
- Attributes: Healing

Bhaiṣajyaguru (Sanskrit: भैषज्यगुरु, Chinese: 藥師佛, Japanese: 薬師仏, Korean: 약사불, Vietnamese: Dược Sư Phật, Standard Tibetan: སངས་རྒྱས་སྨན་བླ), or Bhaishajyaguru, formally Bhaiṣajya-guru-vaiḍūrya-prabha-rāja ("Medicine Master and King of Lapis Lazuli Light"; Chinese: 藥師琉璃光(王)如來, Japanese: 薬師瑠璃光如来, Korean: 약사유리광여래, Vietnamese: Dược Sư Lưu Ly Quang Vương Như Lai), is the Buddha of healing and medicine in Mahāyāna Buddhism. Commonly referred to as the Medicine Buddha, he is described as a doctor who cures suffering (Pali/Sanskrit: dukkha/duḥkha) using the medicine of his teachings.

The image of Bhaiṣajyaguru is usually expressed with a canonical Buddha-like form holding a gallipot and, in some versions, possessing blue or deep green skin. Though also considered to be a guardian of the East, in most cases, Akshobhya is given that role. As an exceptional case, the honzon of Mount Kōya's Kongōbu-ji was changed from Akshobhya to Bhaiṣajyaguru.

== Origin ==
Bhaiṣajyaguru is described in the eponymous Bhaiṣajya-guru-vaiḍūrya-prabha-rāja Sūtra, commonly called the Medicine Buddha Sūtra, as a Bodhisattva who made twelve (12) great vows. His name is generally translated as "Medicine Guru, King of Lapis Lazuli Light". "Vaiḍūrya" is a precious stone which most translators have rendered as lapis lazuli. Librarian Marianne Winder has proposed that "vaiḍūrya" originally meant beryl; however, pure beryl is colorless, while its blue variant, aquamarine, is described as a 'precious blue-green color-of-sea-water stone' rather than the usual dark blue attributed to Bhaiṣajyaguru. While there is a dark blue variety of aquamarine called maxixe (pronounced mah-she-she), it is a New World gemstone—found primarily at the Maxixe Mine in the Piauí Valley near Itinga, Minas Gerais, Brazil—and was not known before 1917. (Note: Watkins (2002), p. 21: "Gemstones appearing the same shade of blue may look blue due to very different structural features. For instance, [...] the blueness of lapis lazuli results from vibrational energy; the blueness of Maxixe-type beryl results from a radiation-induced color center") (Note: Beryl is also a known carcinogen with acute toxic effects leading to the uncurable condition known as berylliosis when inhaled.)

On achieving Buddhahood, Bhaiṣajyaguru became the Buddha of the eastern pure land of Vaiḍūryanirbhāsa "Pure Lapis Lazuli". There, he is attended to by two Bodhisattvas symbolizing the light of the sun and the light of the moon respectively:

- Sūryaprabha (Chinese: 日光遍照菩薩; pinyin: rìguāng biànzhào púsà)
- Candraprabha (Chinese: 月光遍照菩薩; pinyin: yuèguāng biànzhào púsà)

The Tang Chinese Buddhist monk Xuanzang visited a Mahāsāṃghika monastery at Bamiyan, Afghanistan, in the 7th century CE, and the site of this monastery has been rediscovered by archaeologists. Birchbark manuscript fragments from several Mahāyāna sūtras have been discovered at the site, including the Bhaiṣajya-guru-vaidūrya-prabha-rāja Sūtra (MS 2385).

A Sanskrit manuscript of the Bhaiṣajya-guru-vaiḍūrya-prabha-rāja Sūtra was among the texts attesting to the popularity of Bhaiṣajyaguru in the ancient northwest Indian kingdom of Gandhāra. The manuscripts in this find are dated before the 7th century, and are written in the upright Gupta script.

== His twelve vows ==
The twelve vows of Medicine Buddha upon attaining Enlightenment, according to the Medicine Buddha Sūtra are:

1. I vow that my body shall shine as beams of brilliant light on this infinite and boundless world, showering on all beings, getting rid of their ignorance and worries with my teachings. May all beings be like me, with a perfect status and character, upright mind and soul, and finally attaining enlightenment like the Buddha.
2. I vow that my body be like crystal, pure and flawless, radiating rays of splendid light to every corner, brightening up and enlightening all beings with wisdom. With the blessings of compassion, may all beings strengthen their spiritual power and physical energy, so that they could fulfill their dreams on the right track.
3. I vow that I shall grant by means of boundless wisdom, all beings with the inexhaustible things that they require, and relieving them from all pains and guilt resulting from materialistic desires. Although clothing, food, accommodation and transport are essentials, it should be utilized wisely as well. Besides self-consumption, the remaining should be generously shared with the community so that all could live harmoniously together.
4. I vow to lead those who have gone astray back to the path of righteousness. Let them be corrected and returned to the Buddha way for enlightenment.
5. I vow that I shall enable all sentient beings to observe precepts for spiritual purity and moral conduct. Should there be any relapse or violation, they shall be guided by repentance. Provided they sincerely regret their wrong-doings, and vow for a change with constant prayers and strong faith in the Buddha, they could receive the rays of forgiveness, recover their lost moral and purity.
6. I vow that all beings who are physically disabled or sick in all aspects be blessed with good health, both physically and mentally. All who pay homage to Buddha faithfully will be blessed.
7. I vow to relieve all pain and poverty of the very sick and poor. The sick be cured, the helpless be helped, the poor be assisted.
8. I vow to help women who are undergoing sufferings and tortures and seeking for transformation into men. By hearing my name, paying homage and praying, their wishes would be granted and ultimately attain Buddhahood.
9. I vow to free all beings from evil thought and its control. I shall lead them onto the path of light through inculcating them with righteousness and honour so that they will walk the Buddha way.
10. I vow to save prisoners who have genuinely repented and victims of natural disasters. My supreme powers will bless those who are sincere and be freed from sufferings.
11. I vow to save those who suffer from starvation and those who committed a crime to obtain food. If they hear my name and faithfully cherish it, I shall lead them to the advantages of Dharma and favour them with the best food that they may eventually lead a tranquil and happy life.
12. I vow to save those who suffer from poverty, tormented by mosquitoes and wasps day and night. If they come across my name, cherish it with sincerity and practice dharma to strengthen their merits, they will be able to achieve their wishes.
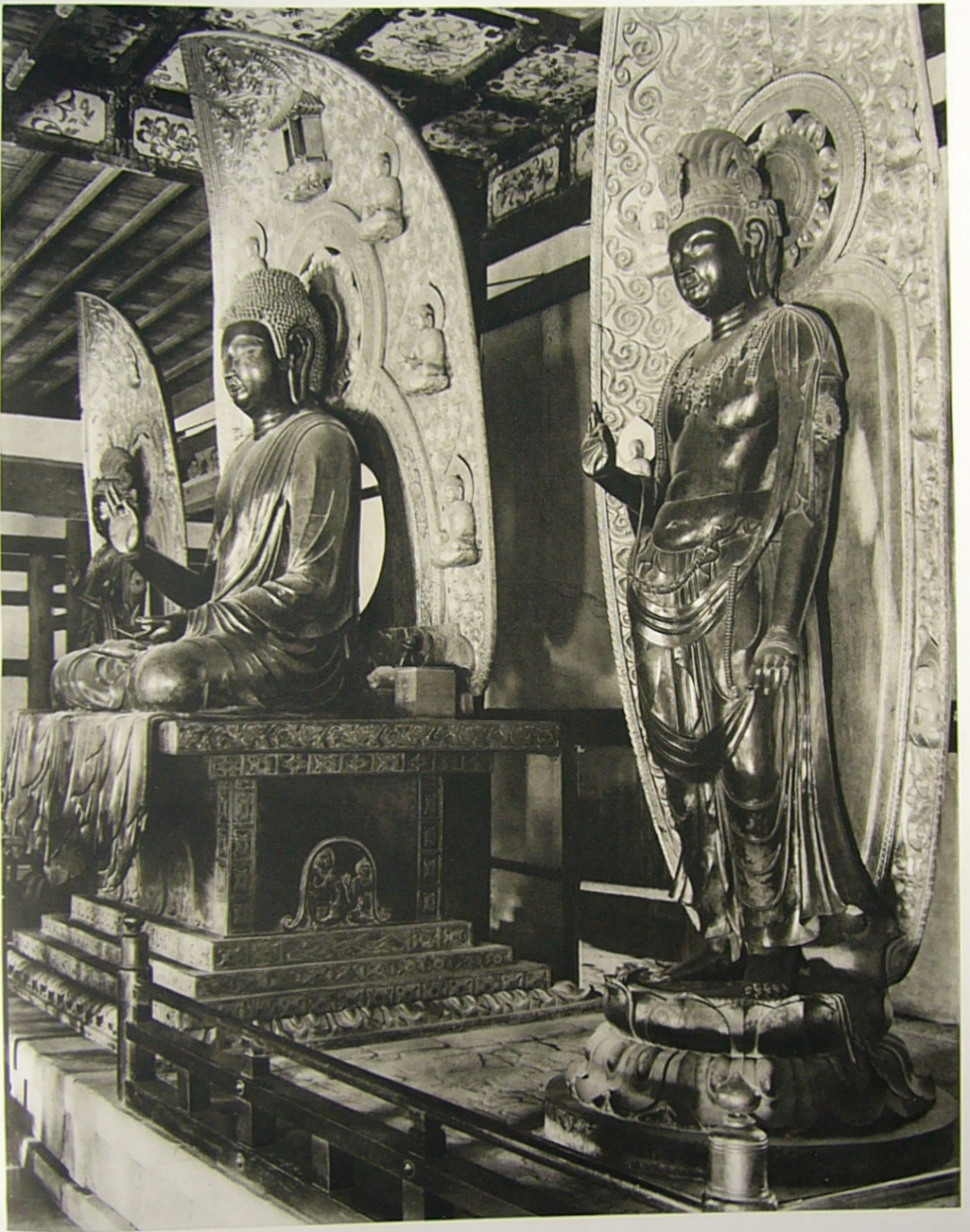
Yakushi-ji, 8th century, Japan

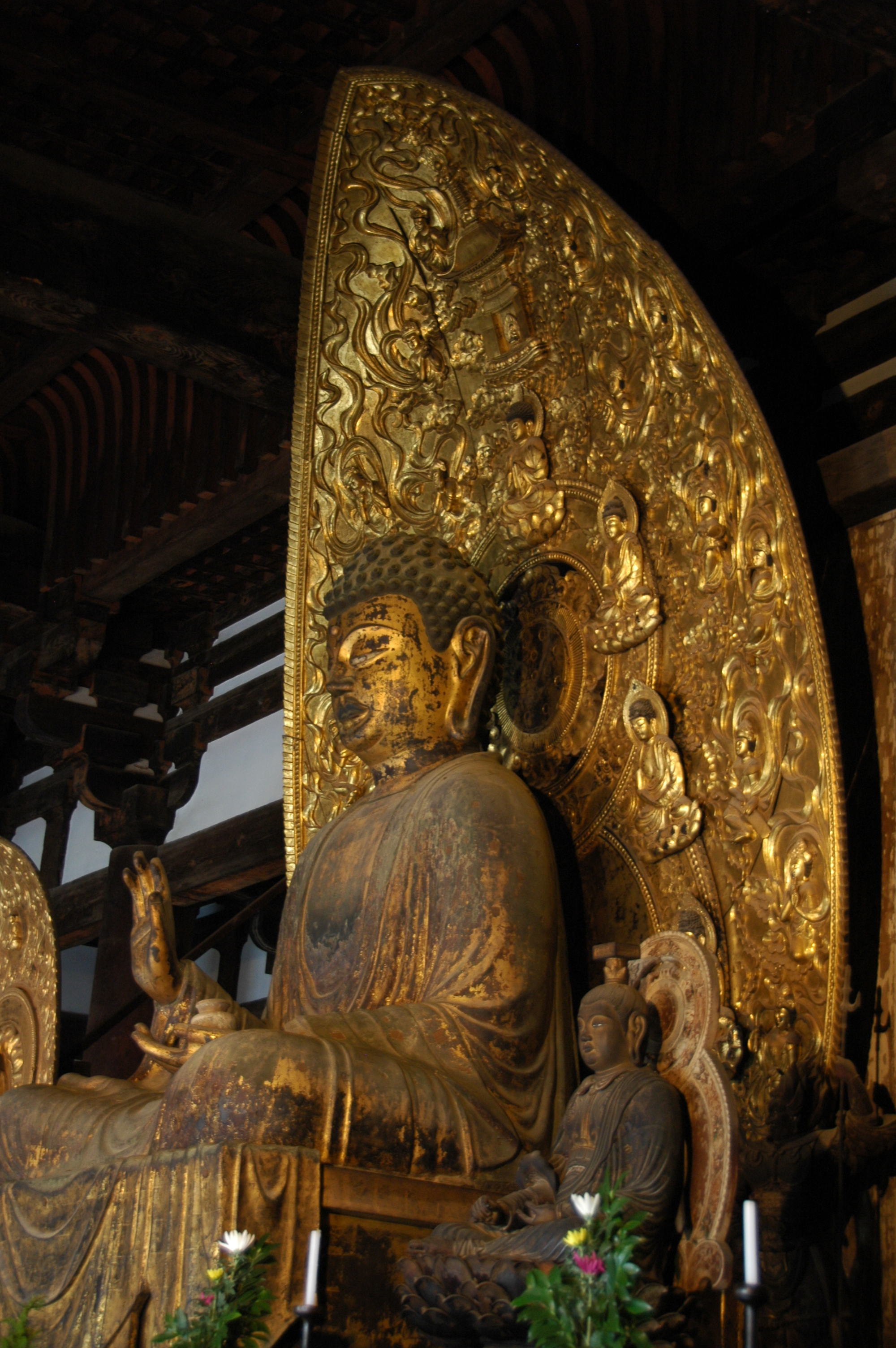
Kōfuku-ji, 15th century, Japan

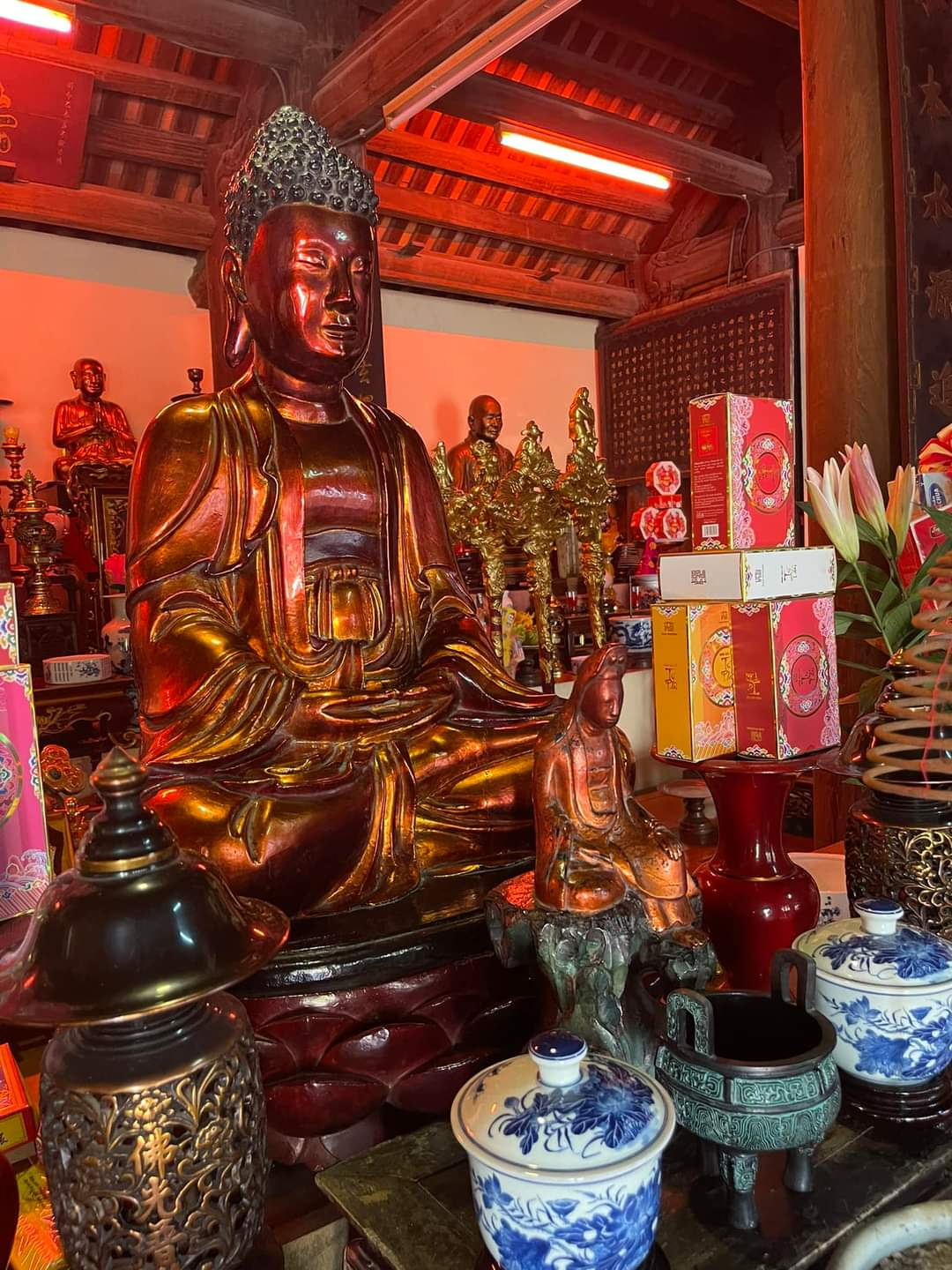
Bhaiṣajyaguru statue in a temple in Northern Vietnam, 19th century

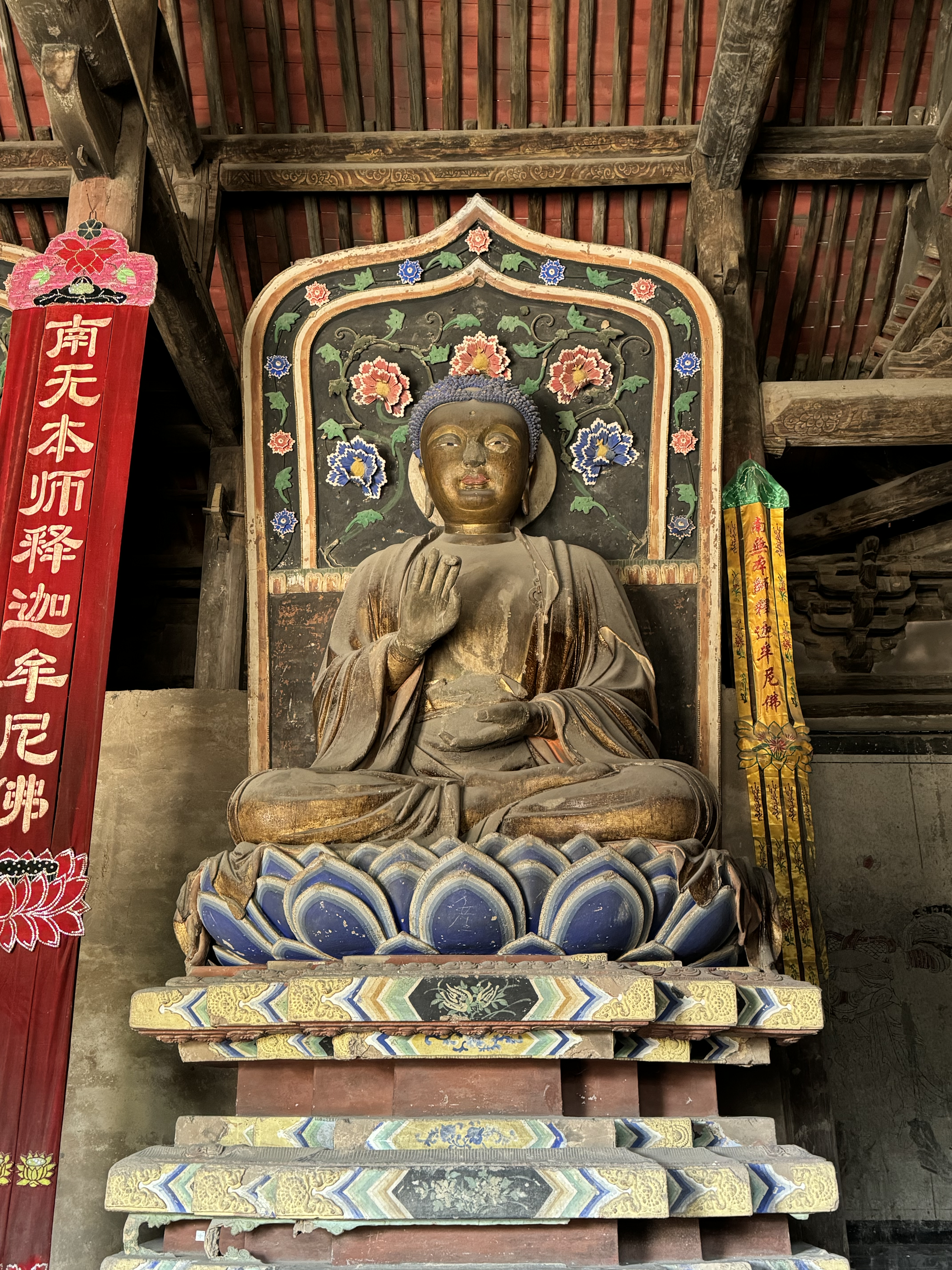
Chongfu Temple^{[zh]} in Shanxi, China, dated to the Ming dynasty (1368–1644)

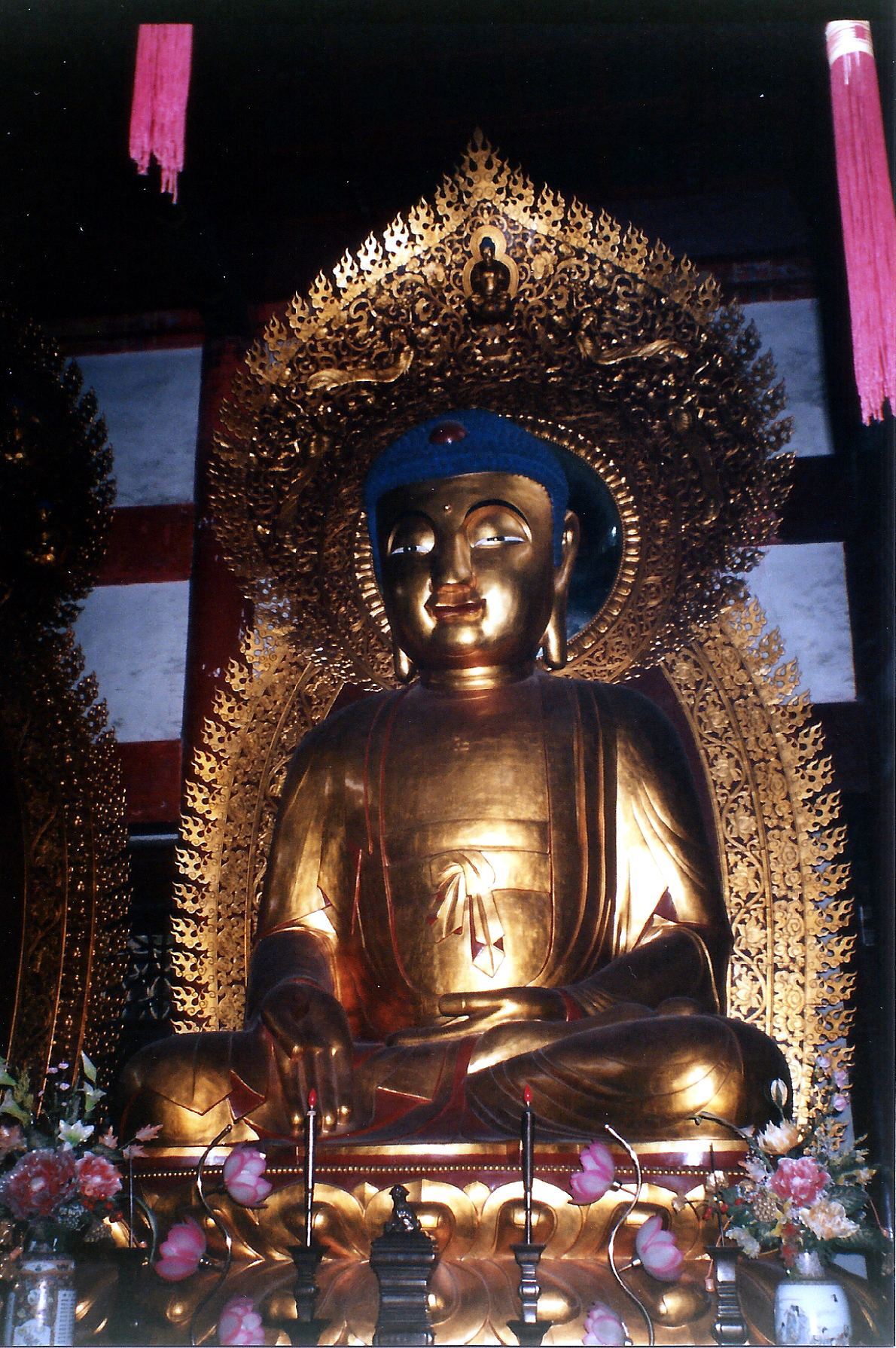
Liurong Temple in Guangzhou, China. Cast in 1663 during the Ming dynasty (1368–1644).

== Iconography ==
Bhaiṣajyaguru is typically depicted seated, wearing the three robes of a Buddhist monk, holding a lapis-colored jar of medicine nectar in his left hand and the right hand resting on his right knee, holding the stem of the Aruna fruit or Myrobalan between thumb and forefinger. In the sūtra, he is also described by his aura of lapis lazuli-colored light. In Chinese depictions, he is sometimes holding a pagoda, symbolising the ten thousand Buddhas of the three periods of time. He is also depicted standing on a Northern Wei stele from approximately 500 CE now housed in the Metropolitan Museum of Art, accompanied by his two attendants, Sūryaprabha and Candraprabha. Within the halo are depicted the Seven Bhaiṣajyaguru Buddhas and seven apsaras.

== Translations ==
=== Chinese ===
Full digitized copy of a Qing dynasty (1644–1912) edition of Xuanzang's translation of the Bhaiṣajya-guru-vaiḍūrya-prabha-rāja Sūtra, personally handwritten by the eminent Patriarch of the Nanshan Vinaya tradition, Venerable Hongyi (1880–1942).

There are several popular Chinese translations of sūtras associated with Bhaiṣajyaguru used throughout East Asian Buddhist traditions, with two of the most popular ones being one by Xuanzang and the other by Yijing both translated in the Tang dynasty. The Taisho Tripitaka and Qianlong Tripitaka (Chinese: 乾隆大藏經) each contain four translations of the sūtra:

1. By Srimitra in the fourth century CE (Taisho: vol. 21, no. 1331; Qianlong: no. 163).
2. By Dharmagupta in 615 CE (Taisho: vol. 14, no. 449; Qianlong: no. 166)
3. By Xuanzang in 650 CE (Taisho: vol. 14, no. 450; Qianlong: no. 167)
4. By Yijing in 707 CE (Taisho: vol. 14, no. 451; Qianlong: no. 168)

These four versions have different titles:

1. Srimitra: The Sūtra on Abhiṣeka that Removes Sins and Liberates from Saṃsāra Taught by the Buddha Chinese: 佛說灌頂拔除過罪生死得度經
2. Dharmagupta: Sūtra of the Vows of the Medicine Buddha
  Chinese: 藥師如來本願經
3. Xuanzang: Sūtra of the Vows of the Medicine Buddha of Lapis Lazuli Crystal Radiance
  Chinese: 藥師琉璃光如來本願功德經Sanskrit: Bhaiṣajya-guru-vaiḍūrya-prabha-rāja Sūtra
4. Yijing: Sūtra of the Vows of the Medicine Buddha of Lapis Lazuli Crystal Radiance and Seven Past Buddhas
  Chinese: 藥師琉璃光七佛本願功德經 (no. 168, two scrolls) Sanskrit: Saptatathāgatapūrvapraṇidhānaviśeṣavistara

The version translated by Yijing includes not only the vows of Yaoshi but also the vows of six other Buddhas.

== Local forms and practices ==
=== China ===
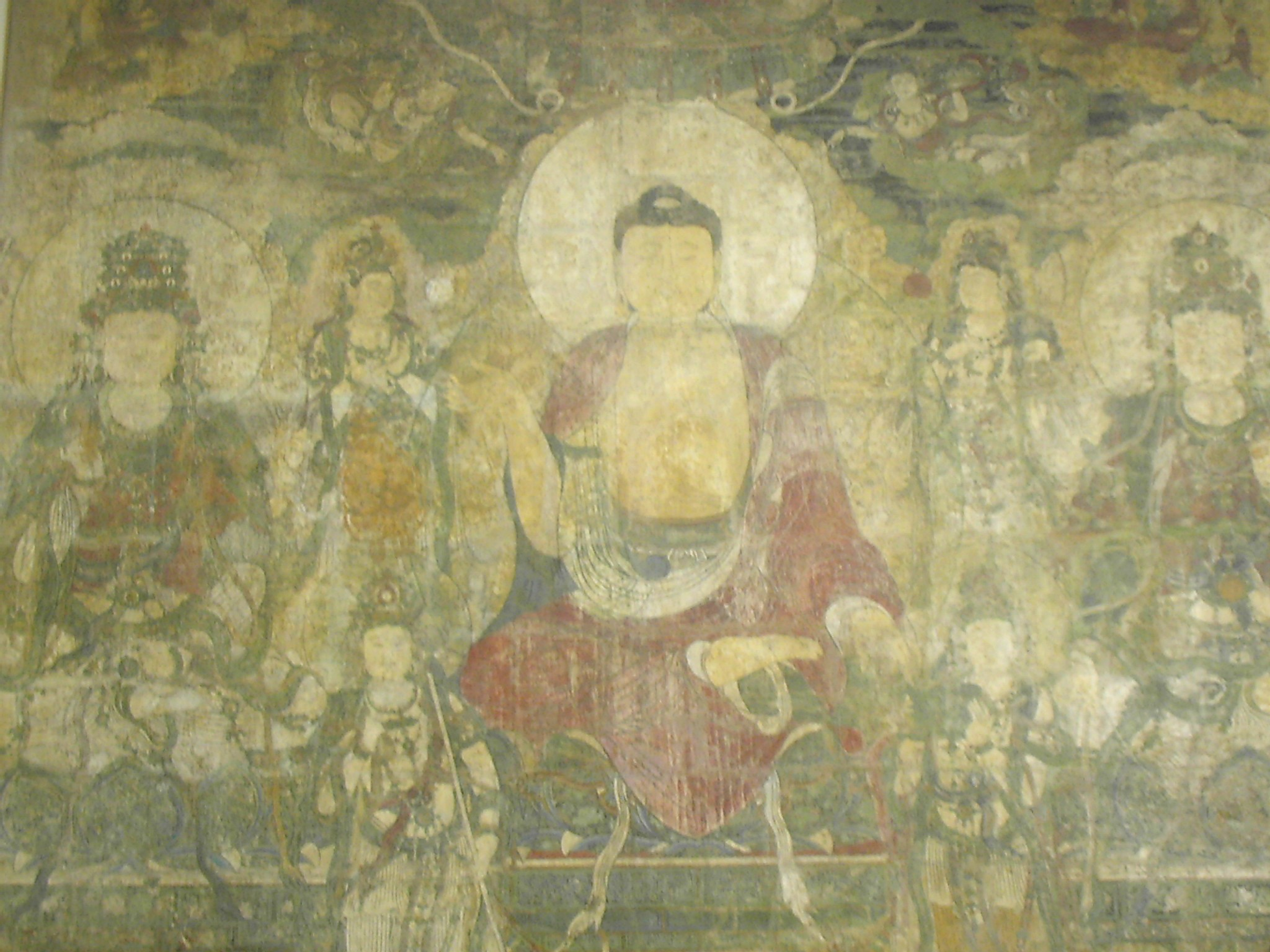
The Pure Land of Bhaisajyaguru, a wall mural made circa 1319 CE, Yuan dynasty

In Chinese Buddhist practice, the Buddha Bhaiṣajyaguru is commonly referred to as simply Yaoshi Fo (藥師佛), meaning "Medicine Teacher Buddha", or Yaoshi Rulai (藥師如來), meaning "Medicine Teacher Tathāgata". In many liturgies and ritual contexts, Yaoshi's name is also frequently chanted as either Yaoshi Liuli Guang Rulai (藥師琉璃光如來), meaning "Yaoshi Rulai of Lapis Lazuli Light", or Xiaozai Yanshou Yaoshi Fo (消灾延壽藥師佛), meaning "Yaoshi Fo who averts calamities and extends lifespans".

He is called Yaoshi in China.

A major component of the worship of Yaoshi is the ceremonial lighting of lamps. This practice derives from the Bhaiṣajya-guru-vaiḍūrya-prabha-rāja Sūtra that was translated by Xuanzang, and typically involves the temple setting up an altar consisting of forty-nine lamps, which are supposed to remain continuously lit for the entirety of the ritual period. Traditionally, oil lamps were used, but some temples may also use electrical lighting in contemporary times. Due to Yaoshi's rites being frequently performed to pray for longevity, these lamps have become commonly known in Chinese as changming deng (長命燈, lit: "Long life lamps"). Five-coloured life-extending banners known as fan (幡) are also typically set up together with the lamps. After the lamps are lit and banners are set up, the Bhaiṣajya-guru-vaiḍūrya-prabha-rāja Sūtra is typically recited for the entirety of the ritual period. Historical records show that this ritual was already in practice during the early Tang dynasty. In contemporary times, this ritual is still practiced widely by modern Chinese Buddhist temples, especially during the eighth lunar month, which is traditionally devoted to the rites of Yaoshi according to the Chinese Buddhist liturgical calendar.

Full digitized copy of a modern edition of the Yaoshi Rulai famen jiangshu lu (藥師如來法門講述錄, lit: "Record of the Account of Yaoshi Rulai's Dharma Door" by the eminent Patriarch of the Nanshan Vinaya tradition, Venerable Hongyi (1880–1942), which provides a description of Yaoshi and practices centered around him in Chinese Buddhism

In contemporary Chinese Buddhist practice, the Bhaiṣajya-guru-vaiḍūrya-prabha-rāja Sūtra (the text which forms the basis of Xuanzang's translation), in which Yaoshi and his twelve vows are described in great detail, is a sūtra that is commonly recited in Chinese temples. The mantra of Yaoshi, the Bhaiṣajyaguru Vaiḍūrya Prabhasa Tathāgatā Abhisecani Dhāraṇī (藥師灌頂真言 Yàoshī Guàndǐng Zhēnyán), is counted as one of the Ten Small Mantras commonly recited in daily morning liturgical services at Chinese Buddhist monasteries. The canonical source for this mantra is the Saptatathāgatapūrvapraṇidhānaviśeṣavistara (the text which forms the basis of Yijing's translation). In the sūtra, which describes the great vows of Yaoshi as well as those of six other Buddhas, Yaoshi is described as having entered into a state of samādhi called "Eliminating All the Suffering and Afflictions of Sentient Beings" (滅除一切眾生苦惱). From this samādhi state, he radiated light from his uṣṇīṣa and spoke the mantra:

Sanskrit

- Romanization: Namo bhagavate bhaiṣajyaguru-vaiḍūryaprabharājāya tathāgatāya arhate samyaksaṃbuddhāya tadyathā: oṃ bhaiṣajye bhaiṣajye bhaiṣajya-samudgate svāhā.

=== Tibet ===
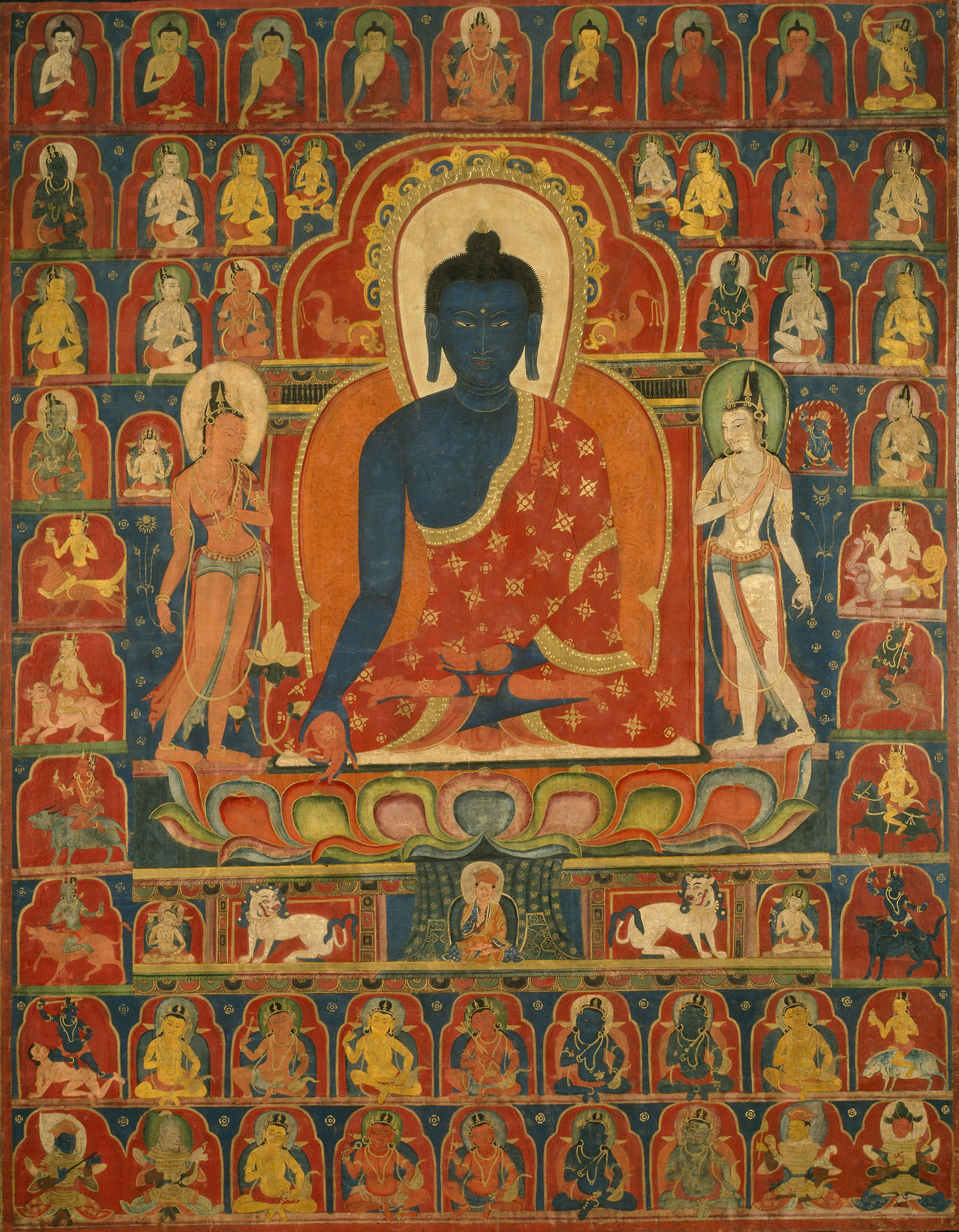
Painted thangka with Bhaishajyaguru, c. between 1201 and 1400

The practice of Medicine Buddha (Sangye Menla in Tibetan: སངས་རྒྱས་སྨན་བླ།, Wylie: sangs rgyas sman bla, THL: sang-gyé men-la) is not only a very powerful method for healing and increasing healing powers both for oneself and others, but also for overcoming the inner sickness of attachment, hatred, and ignorance, thus to meditate on the Medicine Buddha can help decrease physical and mental illness and suffering.

The Medicine Buddha mantra is held to be extremely powerful for healing of physical illnesses and purification of negative karma. In Tibetan, Mahābhaiṣajya is changed to maha bekʰandze radza (མ་ཧཱ་བྷཻ་ཥ་ཛྱེ་རཱ་ཛ་) in the mantra, while 'rāja' (radza) means "king" in Sanskrit. In modern Tibetan language, 'ṣa' (ཥ) is pronounced as 'kʰa' (ཁ), and 'ja' in Sanskrit, as in the cases of 'jye' & 'jya', is historically written with the Tibetan script 'dza' (ཛ). Along with other pronunciation changes, the short mantra is recited as:

ཏདྱ་ཐཱ། ཨོཾ་བྷཻ་ཥ་ཛྱེ་བྷཻ་ཥ་ཛྱེ་མ་ཧཱ་བྷཻ་ཥ་ཛྱེ་རཱ་ཛ་ས་མུདྒ་ཏེ་སྭཱ་ཧཱ།

(Romanization) Teyatʰa: oṃ bekʰandze bekʰandze maha bekʰandze radza samudgate soha.

One form of practice based on the Medicine Buddha is done when one is stricken by disease. The patient is to recite the long Medicine Buddha mantra 108 times over a glass of water. The water is now believed to be blessed by the power of the mantra and the blessing of the Medicine Buddha himself, and the patient is to drink the water. This practice is then repeated each day until the illness is cured.

=== Thailand ===
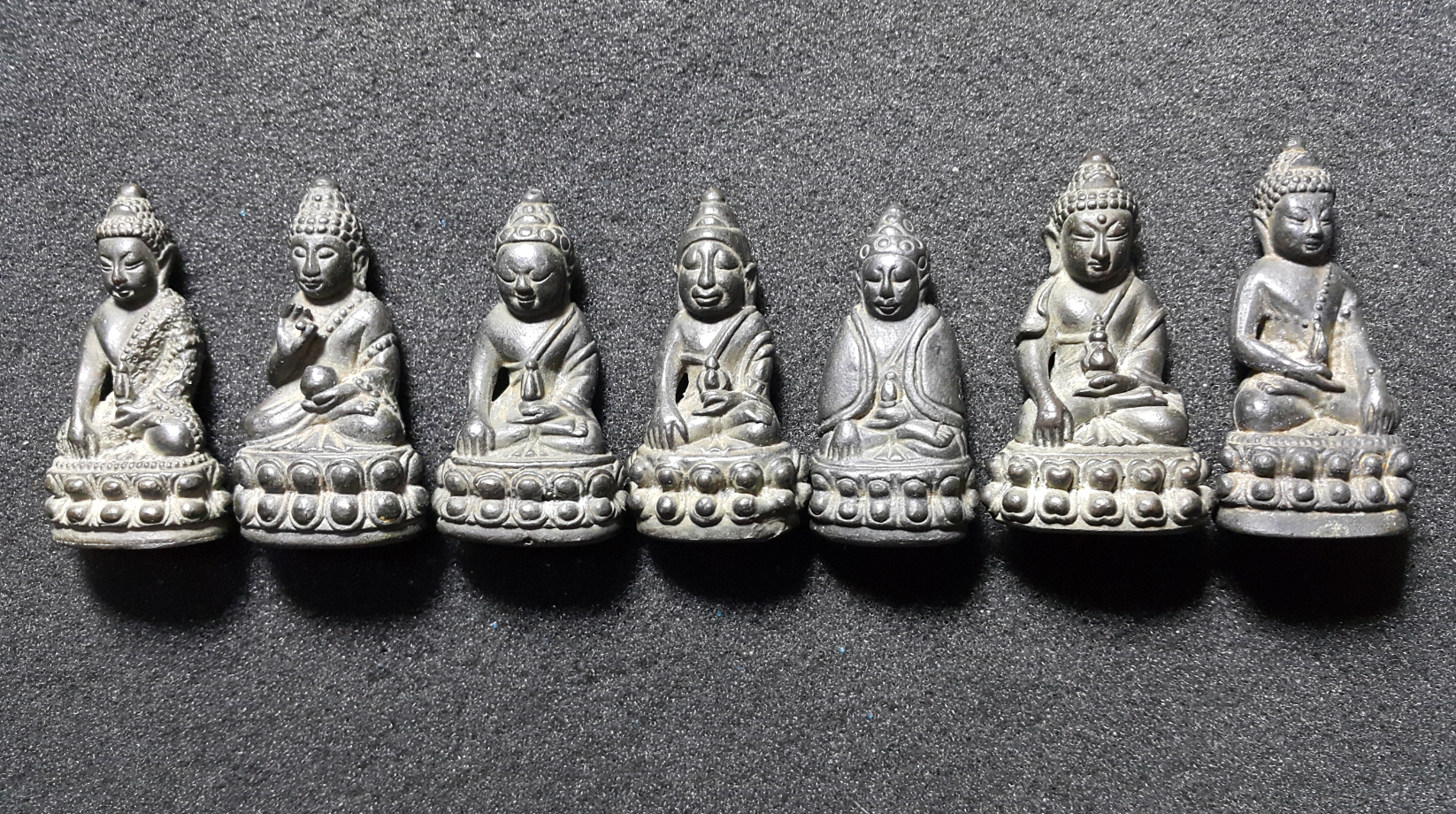
Phra Kring 2395 - 2411

The Phra Kring is a metallic statuette in the image of a meditating Buddha, which is only made in Thailand. The Phra Kring is essentially a Mahayana-style Buddha image, despite the fact that Thailand adheres to Theravada Buddhism, which traditionally only reveres the 28 earthly Buddhas and arahants. The beliefs about the powers of the Phra Kring, are that the Phra Kring is the image of Pra Pai Sachaya Kuru (พระไภษัชยคุรุ Bhaisajyaguru] the medicine Buddha. The image is normally in the posture of sitting and holding an alms bowl or a guava, gourd or a vajra.

According to the tradition, this was a fully enlightened Buddha, who holds the miraculous power to heal and ensure a long, healthy, prosperous life and wealthy standing to those who hear his name (even in passing) or see his image. Among all the other Buddhist countries who revere this figure, only Thailand makes its amulet. The Phra Kring, in most cases (except in the rare instance where Muan Sarn powders prevent the sound), contains a rattling bead inside. The rattle sound, produced by a sacred bead of Chanuan Muan Sarn or other relic, represents the name of the medicine Buddha resounding. Some Phra Kring, however, do not make a sound that is audible to humans, but still contain a piece of Chanuan within, which emits the name of the medicine Buddha silently, only audible on the spiritual plane.

== See also ==
- Index of Buddhism-related articles
- Secular Buddhism
- Statue of Yakushi Nyorai (Jingo-ji)
- Statue of Yakushi Nyorai (Gangō-ji)
- Yaoshi Bao Chan, a repentance ritual centered around Yaoshi
