= Ākāśagarbha =

Bodhisattva in Chinese, Japanese and Korean Buddhism

- Painting of Ākāśagarbha, Japan, 13th century
- Sanskrit: आकाशगर्भ; Ākāśagarbha गगनगञ्ज; Gaganagañja
- Chinese: (Traditional) 虛空藏菩薩 (Simplified) 虚空藏菩萨 (Pinyin: Xūkōngzàng Púsà)
- Japanese: 虚空蔵菩薩(こくうぞうぼさつ) (romaji: Kokūzō Bosatsu)
- Khmer: អាកាសគភ៌ (aa-kas-sak-koa)
- Korean: 허공장보살 (RR: Heogongjang Bosal)
- Mongolian: Огторгуйн зүрхэн
- Tagalog: Akasagarbha
- Thai: พระอากาศครรภโพธิสัตว์
- Tibetan: ནམ་མཁའི་སྙིང་པོ་ Wylie:nam mkha'i snying po THL: Namkhé Nyingpo
- Vietnamese: Hư Không Tạng Bồ Tát

Information
- Venerated by: Mahāyāna, Vajrayāna

Ākāśagarbha (Chinese: 虛空藏菩薩; pinyin: Xūkōngzàng Púsà; Japanese pronunciation: Kokūzō Bosatsu; Korean: 허공장보살; romaja: Heogongjang Bosal; Vietnamese: Hư Không Tạng Bồ Tát, Standard Tibetan: Namkha'i Nyingpo) is a bodhisattva in Chinese, Japanese and Korean Buddhism who is associated with the great element (mahābhūta) of space (ākāśa).

== Overview ==
Ākāśagarbha is regarded as one of the eight great bodhisattvas. His name can be translated as "boundless space treasury" or "void store" as his wisdom is said to be boundless as space itself. He is sometimes known as the twin brother of the "earth store" bodhisattva Kṣitigarbha, and is even briefly mentioned in the Kṣitigarbha Bodhisattva Pūrvapraṇidhāna Sūtra.

Associated with the qualities of Gautama Buddha, he is able to purify transgressions.

Kūkai, the founder of Shingon Buddhism, met a famous monk who is said to have repeatedly chanted a mantra of Ākāśagarbha as a young Buddhist acolyte. Kūkai took a tutorial with him on Kokuzou-Gumonji (a secret doctrine method, 虚空蔵求聞持法). As he chanted the mantra, he experienced a vision whereby Ākāśagarbha told him to go to Tang China to seek understanding of the Mahāvairocana Abhisaṃbodhi Sūtra. Later he would go to China to learn Tangmi from Huiguo, and then go on to found the Shingon tradition of esoteric Buddhism in Heian Japan.

== Sutras ==
There are several Mahāyāna sūtras in which Ākāśagarbha Bodhisattva is a central figure:

- 《虛空藏菩薩經》 (Ākāśagarbha Bodhisattva Sūtra T.405)
- 《佛説虚空藏菩薩神呪經》(Buddha Speaks the Ākāśagarbha Bodhisattva Dhāraṇī Sūtra T.406)
- 《虛空藏菩薩神呪經》(Ākāśagarbha Bodhisattva Dhāraṇī Sūtra T.0407)
- 《虛空孕菩薩經》 (Ākāśagarbha Bodhisattva Sūtra T.0408)
- 《觀虚空藏菩薩經 》(The Meditation on Ākāśagarbha Bodhisattva Sūtra T.0409)
- 《虚空藏菩薩能滿諸願最勝心陀羅尼求聞持法》(The Method of the Victorious, Essential Dharāṇi for Having Wishes Heard by the Bodhisattva Space-Store Who Can Fulfill Requests T.1145)
- 《大虚空藏菩薩念誦法》 (The Method of Invoking the Great Ākāśagarbha Bodhisattva T.1146)
- 《聖虛空藏菩薩陀羅尼經》 (Dhāraṇī of the Space-Store Bodhisattva T.1147)
- 《佛説虚空藏陀羅尼》 (Buddha Speaks the Ākāśagarbha Dharāṇi T.1148)
- 《五大虚空藏菩薩速疾大神驗祕密式經》(The Five Great Ākāśagarbha Bodhisattvas Sūtra T.1149)
- 《虛空藏菩薩問七佛陀羅尼呪經》(Ārya Saptabuddhaka Sūtra or Dhāraṇī of the Space-Store Bodhisattvaʼs Questions to Seven Buddhas T.1333)
- 《如來方便善巧呪經》 (Incantation of the Tathāgatas' Skillful Means T.1334)

Additionally, he appears briefly in the final chapter of the Kṣitigarbha Bodhisattva Pūrvapraṇidhāna Sūtra, requesting the Buddha preach on the benefits of praising both the Sūtra and Kṣitigarbha.

== Five Great Ākāśagarbhas ==
The Five Great Ākāśagarbhas are manifestation of the Five Wisdom Buddhas. They are said to bring about an increase of benefits such as good health. Within the traditional mandala, they are arranged as follows:

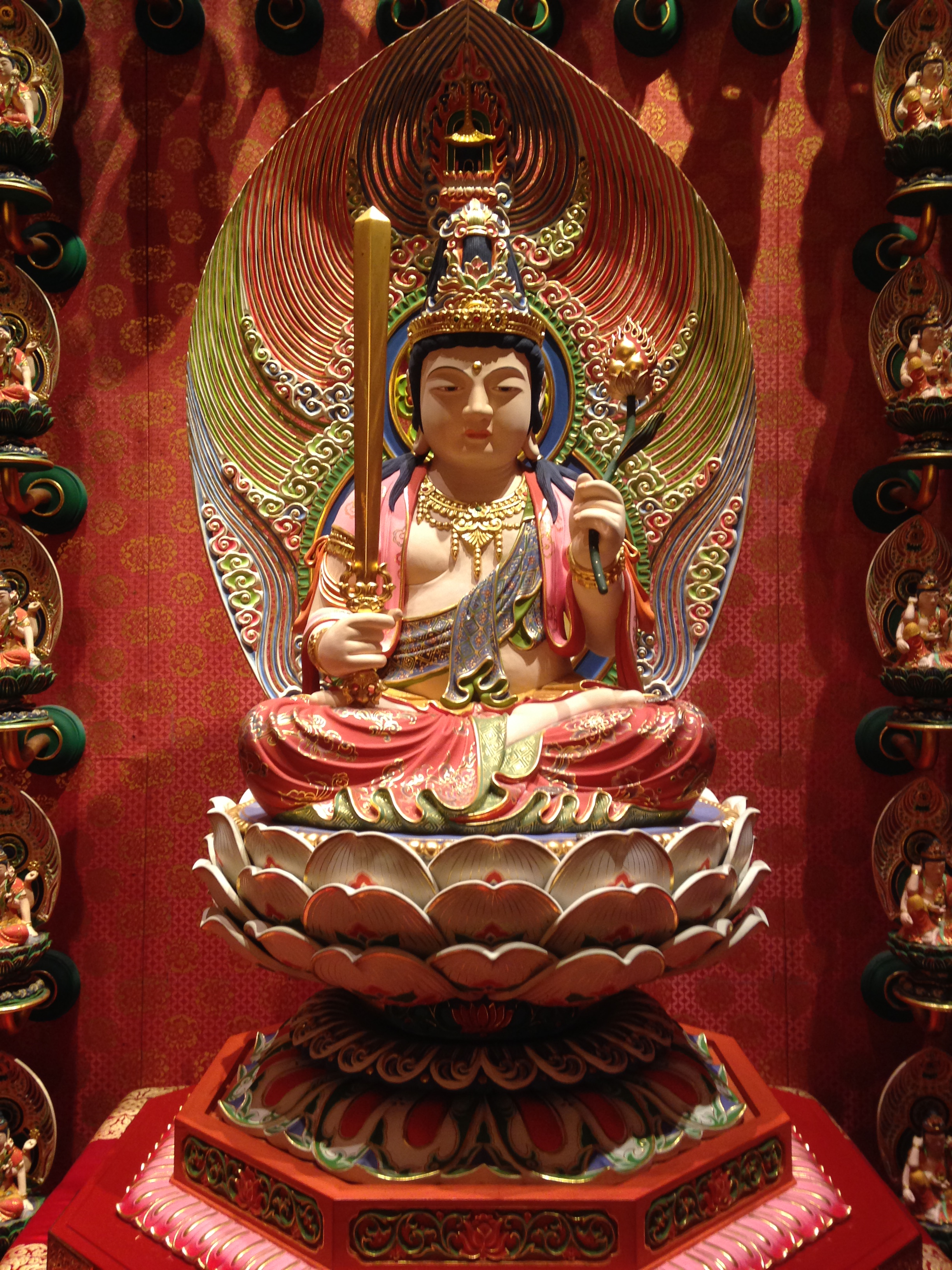
Akasagarbha at Buddha Tooth Relic Temple and Museum in Chinatown, Singapore

Name	Direction	Color	Associated Buddha
Dharmadhātu Ākāśagarbha (法界虚空蔵)	Center	White	Vairocana
Vajradhātu Ākāśagarbha (金剛虚空蔵)	East	Blue	Akṣobhya
Ratnaprabha Ākāśagarbha (宝光虚空蔵)	South	Yellow	Ratnasambhava
Padma Ākāśagarbha (蓮華虚空蔵)	West	Red	Amitābha
Karma Ākāśagarbha (業用虚空蔵)	North	Black	Amoghasiddhi

== Mantras ==
The mantra of Ākāśagarbha is believed to give rise to wisdom and creativity, and dispel ignorance.

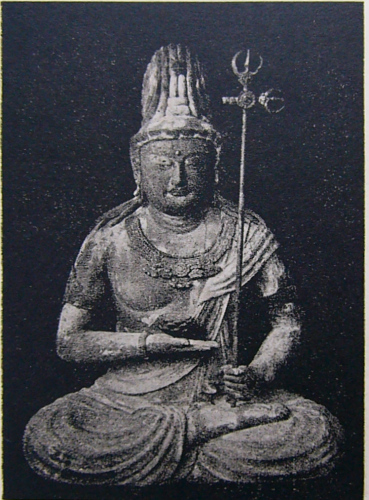
Ākāśagarbha statue in Jingo-ji, Japan. 9th century

- Traditional Chinese: 南無 虚空藏 菩薩
- Chinese (Pinyin): Nāmo Xūkōngzàng Púsà
- Japanese (Rōmaji): Namu Kokuzō Bosatsu
- Korean: Namu Heogongjang Bosal
- Vietnamese: Nam mô Hư Không Tạng Bồ Tát
- Translation: Homage to Ākāśagarbha Bodhisattva

The "morning star mantra" is a common mantra practiced in Shingon Buddhism. It is most often used as part of the Gumonjihō rite that is said to improve one's memory of the teachings and is derived from a sutra called Kokūzō Bosatsu nō man shogan saishō shin darani gumonji hō 虛空藏菩薩能滿諸願最勝心陀羅尼求聞持法 (Taishō Canon #1145). This mantra is:

- Sanskrit: namo ākāśagarbhāya oṃ ārya kāmāri mauli svāhā
- Traditional Chinese: 南無，阿迦捨，揭婆耶，唵，阿唎，迦麼唎，慕唎，莎嚩訶
- Chinese (Pinyin): Nánmó, ājiāshě, jiēpóyé, ǎn, ālì, jiāmelì, mùlì, shāmóhē
- Japanese (Rōmaji): namu akyasha kyarabaya on arikya mari bori sowaka
- Translation: Homage to Ākāśagarbha, Om - Crown of the Noble Enemy of Kāma - svāhā

== Sources ==
- Abe, Ryūichi (13 August 2013). The Weaving of Mantra: Kūkai and the Construction of Esoteric Buddhist Discourse. Columbia University Press. ISBN 978-0-231-52887-0.
- French, Frank G.; Shih, Tao-tsi; Śikṣānanda (2003). The Sutra of Bodhisattva Ksitigarbha's Fundamental Vows. Corporate Body of the Buddha Educational Foundation.
