= Akshobhya =

One of the Five Wisdom Buddhas

Akṣobhya
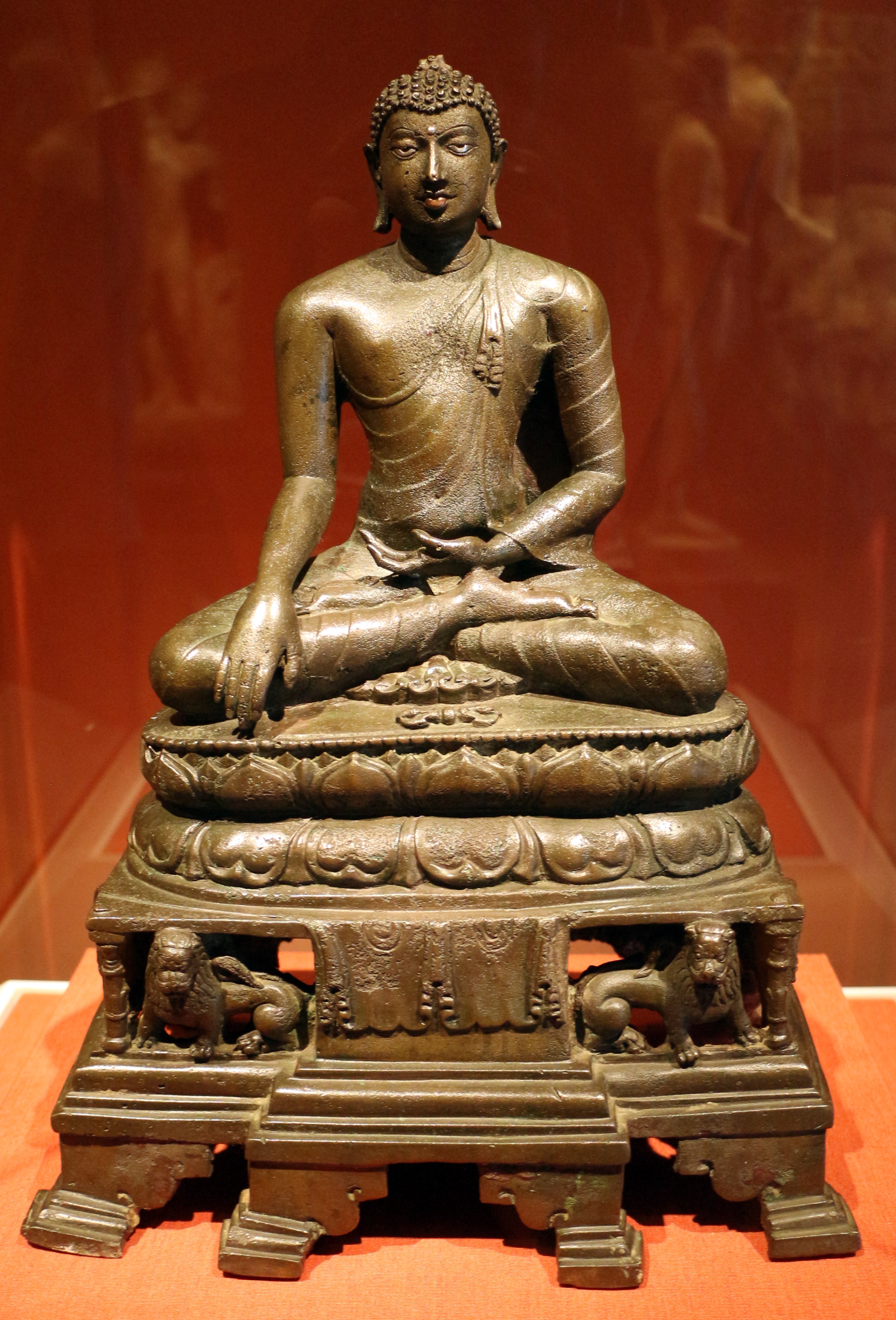
- Sculpture of Akṣobhya from 890 CE, Bihar, India
- Sanskrit: अक्षोभ्य; Akṣobhya
- Chinese: 阿閦佛 (Pinyin: Āchù Fó)
- Japanese: 阿閦如来 (romaji: Ashuku Nyorai)
- Khmer: អសុភ្យ (a-sop), អសុភ្យពុទ្ធ
- Korean: 아촉불 (RR: Achog Bul)
- Mongolian: ᠮᠢᠨᠲᠣᠭᠪᠠ᠂ ᠬᠦᠳᠡᠯᠦᠰᠢ ᠦᠭᠡᠢ; Минтугва, Хөдөлшгүй; SASM/GNC: Mintugba, Ködelüsi ügei
- Thai: พระอักโษภยพุทธะ
- Tibetan: མི་བསྐྱོད་པ་ Wylie: mi bskyod pa THL: mikyöpa
- Vietnamese: A Súc Bệ Phật, Bất Động Phật

Information
- Venerated by: Mahāyāna, Vajrayāna

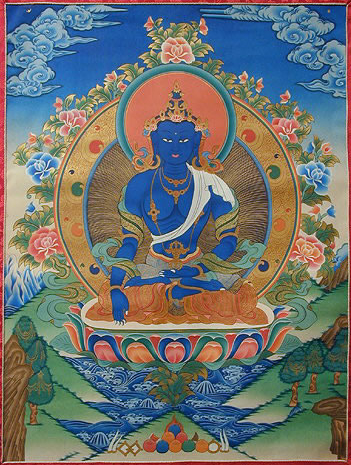
Akshobhya

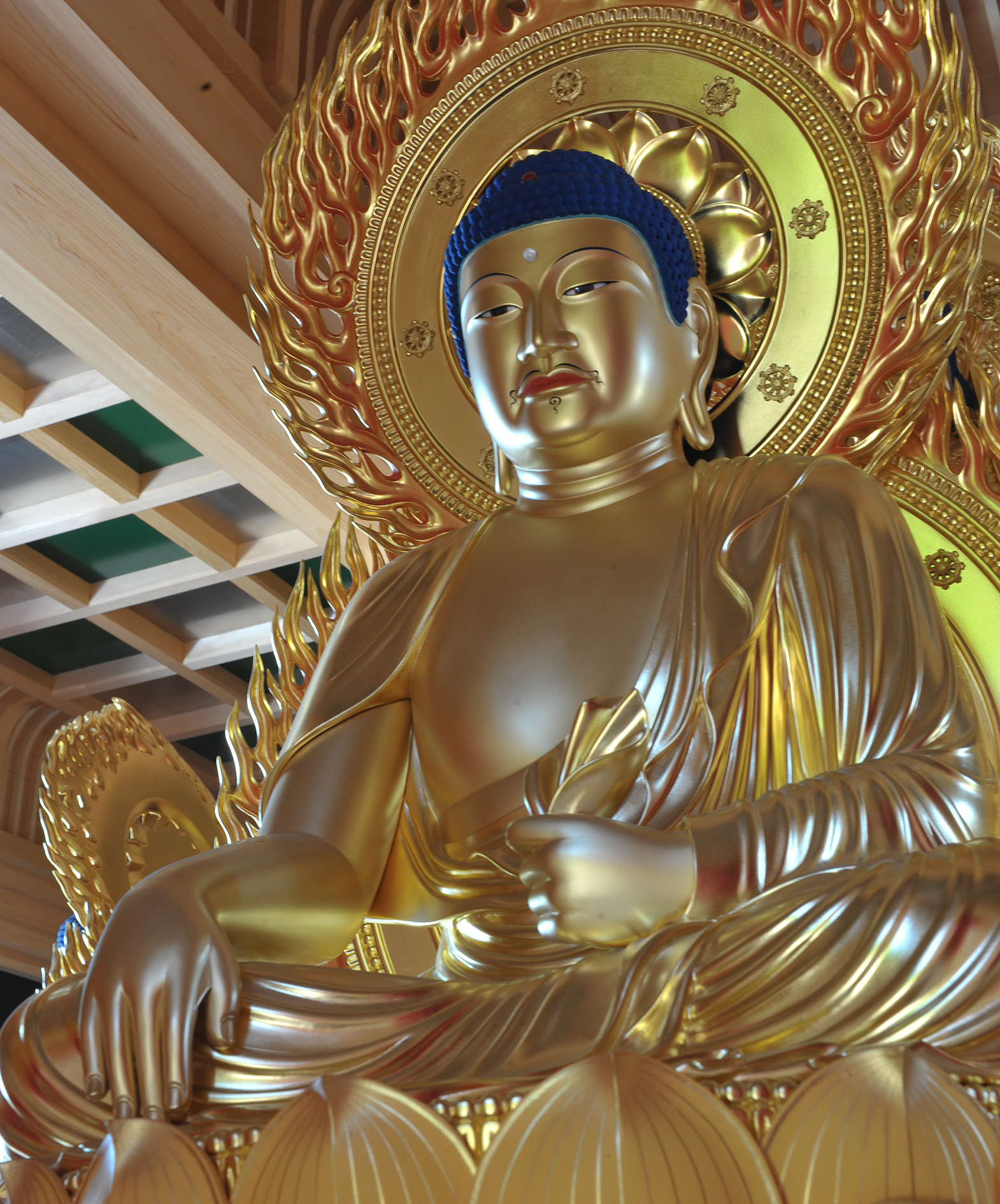
Renge-in Tanjō-ji

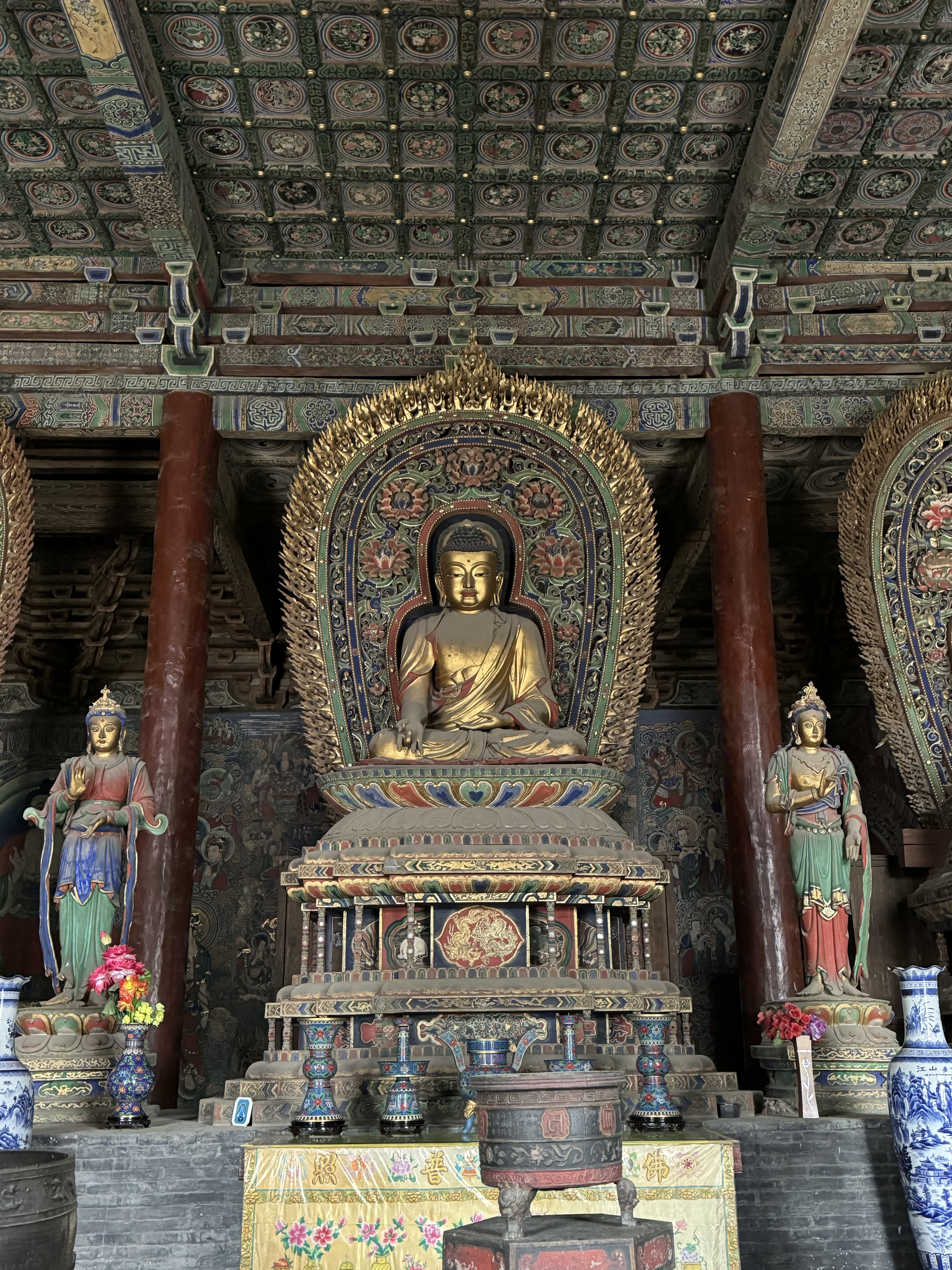
Statue of Akṣobhya in Huayan Temple in Shanxi, China, one out of a set depicting the Five Tathāgatas

Akshobhya (Sanskrit: अक्षोभ्य, Akṣobhya, "Immovable One"; traditional Chinese: 阿閦如来; ; pinyin: Āchùrúlái; Japanese pronunciation: Ashuku Nyorai) is one of the Five Wisdom Buddhas, a product of the Adibuddha, who represents consciousness as an aspect of reality. By convention he is located in the east of the Diamond Realm and is the lord of the Eastern Pure Land Abhirati ('The Joyous'). His consort is Lochanā and he is normally accompanied by two elephants. His color is blue-black and his attributes include a bell, three robes, and staff, as well as a jewel, lotus, prayer wheel, and sword. He has several emanations.

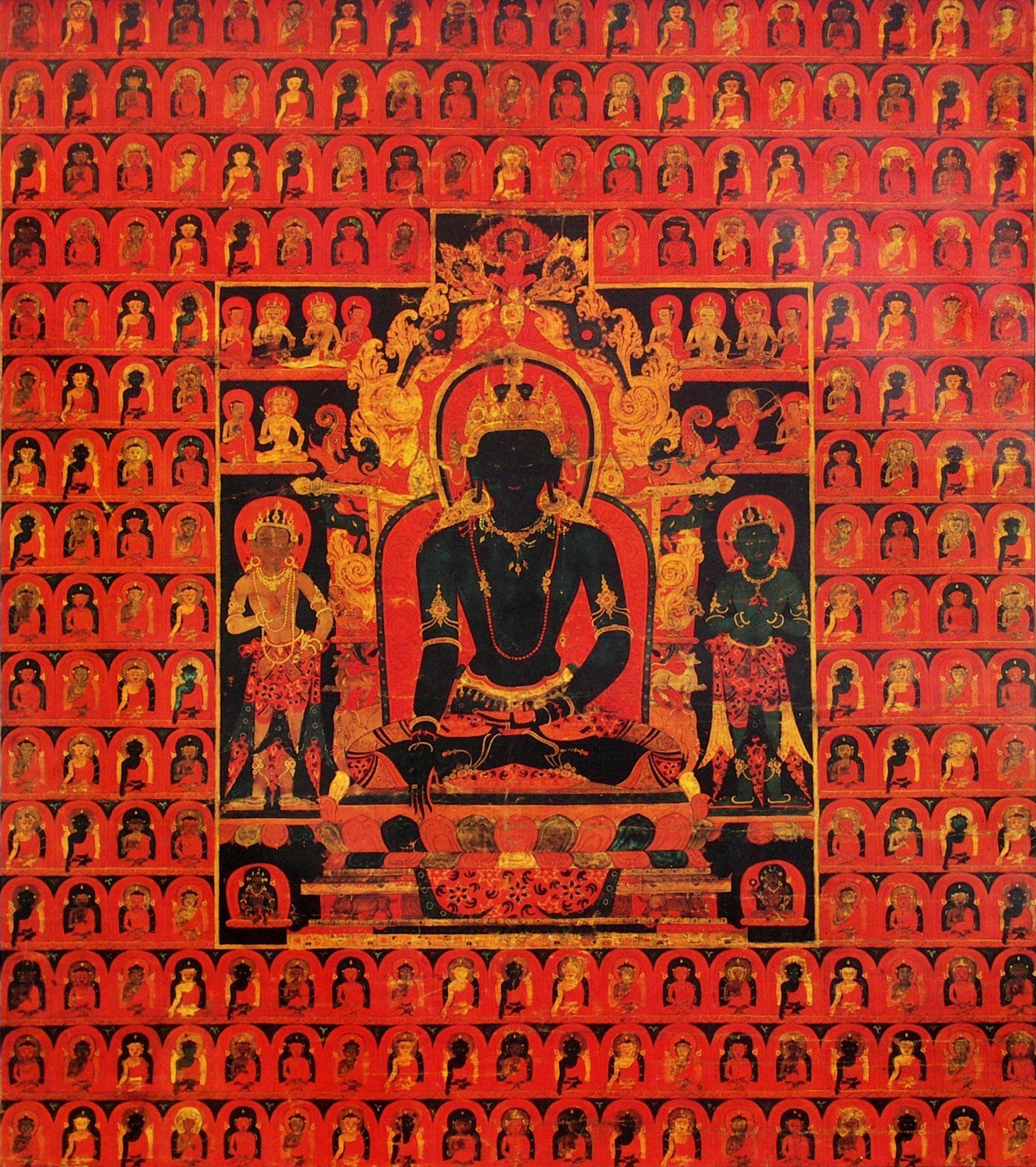
'The Dhyani Buddha Akshobhya', Tibetan thangka, late 13th century, Honolulu Academy of Arts

== Textual history and doctrine ==
Akshobhya appears in the Akṣobhyatathāgatasyavyūha Sūtra (Chinese: 阿閦佛國經; pinyin: Āchùfó Guó Jīng), which was translated during the second century CE and is among the oldest known Mahayana or Pure Land texts. According to the scripture, a monk wished to practice the Dharma in the eastern world of delight and made a vow not to harbor anger or malice towards any being until he achieved enlightenment. He duly proved "immovable" and when he succeeded, he became the buddha Akshobhya. Recently, newly discovered Gāndhārī texts from Pakistan in the Bajaur Collection have been found to contain fragments of an early Mahāyāna sutra mentioning Akshobhya. Preliminary dating through paleography suggests a late 1st century to early 2nd century CE provenance. More conclusive radiocarbon dating is under way. A preliminary report on these texts has been issued by Ingo Strauch, with a paper on Akshobhya texts published in 2010.

In the Śūraṅgama mantra (Chinese: 楞嚴咒; pinyin: Léngyán Zhòu) taught in the Śūraṅgama sutra (Chinese: 楞嚴經; pinyin: Léngyán Jīng), an especially influential dharani in the Chinese Chan tradition, Akshobhya is mentioned to be the host of the Vajra Division in the East, one of the five major divisions which controls the vast demon armies of the five directions.

Akshobhya is sometimes merged with Acala, whose name also means "immovable" in Sanskrit. Prior to the advent of Bhaiṣajyaguru, Akshobhya was the subject of a minor cult in Japan as a healing Buddha, though both are currently venerated within Shingon Buddhism.

== Iconography ==
Akshobhya is the embodiment of 'mirror knowledge' (Sanskrit: ādarśa-jñāna; refer Panchajnana). This may be described as a knowledge of what is real, and what is illusion, or a mere reflection of actual reality. The mirror may be likened to the mind itself. It is clear like the sky and empty, yet luminous. It holds all the images of space and time, yet it is untouched by them. Its brilliance illuminates the darkness of ignorance and its sharpness cuts through confusion. Akshobhya represents this eternal mind, and the Vajra family is similarly associated with it.

The Vajra family, is also associated with the element of water, hence the two colours of the Vajra being blue, like the depths of the ocean; or bright white, like sunlight reflecting off water. Even if the surface of the ocean is blown into crashing waves, the depths remain undisturbed, imperturbable. Although water may seem ethereal and weightless, in truth it is extremely heavy. Water flows into the lowest place and settles there. It carves through solid rock, but calmly, without violence. When frozen, it is hard, sharp, and clear like the intellect, but to reach its full potential, it must also be fluid and adaptable like a flowing river. These are all the essential qualities of Akshobhya.

Many wrathful, tantric beings are represented as blue in colour because they embody the transmuted energy of hatred and aggression into wisdom and enlightenment.

== General and cited references ==
- Jordan, Michael, Encyclopedia of Gods, New York, Facts On File, Inc. 1993, pp. 9–10
- Nattier, Jan (2000). "The Realm of Aksobhya: A Missing Piece in the History of Pure Land Buddhism". Journal of the International Association of Buddhist Studies 23 (1), 71–102.
- Sato, Naomi (2004). Some Aspects of the Cult of Aksobhya in Mahayana, Journal of Indian and Buddhist Studies 52 (2), 18-23
- Strauch, Ingo (2008). "The Bajaur collection: A new collection of Kharoṣṭhī manuscripts. A preliminary catalogue and survey (in progress)" (PDF). Archived from the original (PDF) on 2011-10-03.
- Vessantara, Meeting the Buddhas, Windhorse Publications 2003, chapter 9
