= John Whitefield Kendrick =

American economist (1917–2009)

- Born: 27 July 1917; Brooklyn, New York
- Died: 17 November 2009 (aged 92); Arlington, Virginia
- Education: University of North Carolina, Chapel Hill (BA, MA); George Washington University (PhD)
- Scientific career
- Fields: Economics, Statistics
- Workplaces: George Washington University
- Doctoral students: Carol S. Carson

John Whitefield Kendrick (July 27, 1917, Brooklyn – November 17, 2009, Arlington, Virginia) was an American economist who was a pioneer in productivity measurement and economic accounting.

Kendrick worked as an economist from 1946 to 1953 at the Office of Business Economics, the predecessor to the U.S. Bureau of Economic Analysis, and from 1955 to 1988 as a professor at George Washington University. In 1963 he was elected as a Fellow of the American Statistical Association.

== Education ==
Kendrick received a bachelor's degree in history in 1937 and a master's degree in economics in 1939 from the University of North Carolina at Chapel Hill. In 1955 he received a doctorate from George Washington University.

Dr. Kendrick authored more than a dozen books on economics and productivity.

== Legacy ==
The Kendrick Prizes, named for Dr. Kendrick, are offered by the International Association for Research in Income and Wealth (IARIW) for the best articles published each year in their journal, the Review of Income and Wealth.

== Main works ==
- Kendrick, John W. “Expanding Imputed Values in the National Income and Product Accounts.” Review of Income and Wealth 25, no. 4 (December 1979): 349–363.
- Kendrick, John W.; Carl E. Jones. “Gross National Farm Product in Constant Dollars, 1910–1950.” Survey of Current Business 31 (September 1951): 12–19.
- Kendrick, John W., assisted by Maude R. Pech. Productivity Trends in the United States. National Bureau of Economic Research (NBER) General Series no. 71. Princeton University Press, 1961.
- Kendrick, John W. Postwar Productivity Trends in the United States. New York: National Bureau of Economic Research, 1973.
- Kendrick, John W., assisted by Yvonne Lethem and Jennifer Rowley. The Formation and Stocks of Total Capital. NBER General Series no. 100. New York: Columbia University Press for NBER, 1976.
- Kendrick, John W. and Elliot S. Grossman. Productivity in the United States: Trends and Cycles. Baltimore: The Johns Hopkins University Press, 1980.
- Kendrick, John W. and Beatrice N. Vaccara (eds). New Developments in Productivity Measurement and Analysis. Chicago: The University of Chicago Press, 1980.
