= Carol S. Carson =

American economic statistician

Carol Stine Carson is an American economic statistician, the former director of the U.S. Bureau of Economic Analysis and former director of statistics at the International Monetary Fund.

Carol Stine did her undergraduate studies at the College of Wooster, graduating in 1961, and was vice president of the political science honor society Pi Sigma Alpha there. She earned a master's degree at the Fletcher School of Law and Diplomacy of Tufts University, and completed her studies with a Ph.D. from George Washington University. Her dissertation, The History of the United States Income and Product Accounts: The Development of an Analytical Tool, was written under the supervision of John Whitefield Kendrick in 1971, and concerned "the history of national accounts in the U.S.". It followed Kendrick in treating these accounts as an increasingly-honed "tool for macroeconomic analysis".

In 1972, Carson joined the Bureau of Economic Analysis. Before becoming its director, she was also chief statistician there, and editor-in-chief of their journal, Survey of Current Business. During this time, she also assisted with the 1993 revision of the United Nations System of National Accounts.

In 1991, Carson won the Julius Shiskin Memorial Award for Economic Statistics of the American Statistical Association Business and Economics Statistics Section, "for her leadership in developing and refining the economic statistical base of the U.S. and for her contributions to the development of the revised U.N. System of National Accounts". She is also an elected member of the International Statistical Institute.

== Bibliography ==
- Mrs. Carol S. Carson (2001). Toward a Framework for Assessing Data Quality. International Monetary Fund.
- Carol S. Carson; Lucie Laliberté (February 2002). Assessing Accuracy and Reliability: A Note Based on Approaches Used in National Accounts and Balance of Payments Statistics. International Monetary Fund. ISBN 9781451844153.
- Carol S. Carson; Charles Enoch; Claudia Helene Dziobek (25 September 2002). Statistical Implications of Inflation Targeting: Getting the Right Numbers and Getting the Numbers Right. International Monetary Fund. ISBN 978-1-58906-132-3., OCLC 50805865
