= Affordable affluence =

Use of high-end goods as status symbols

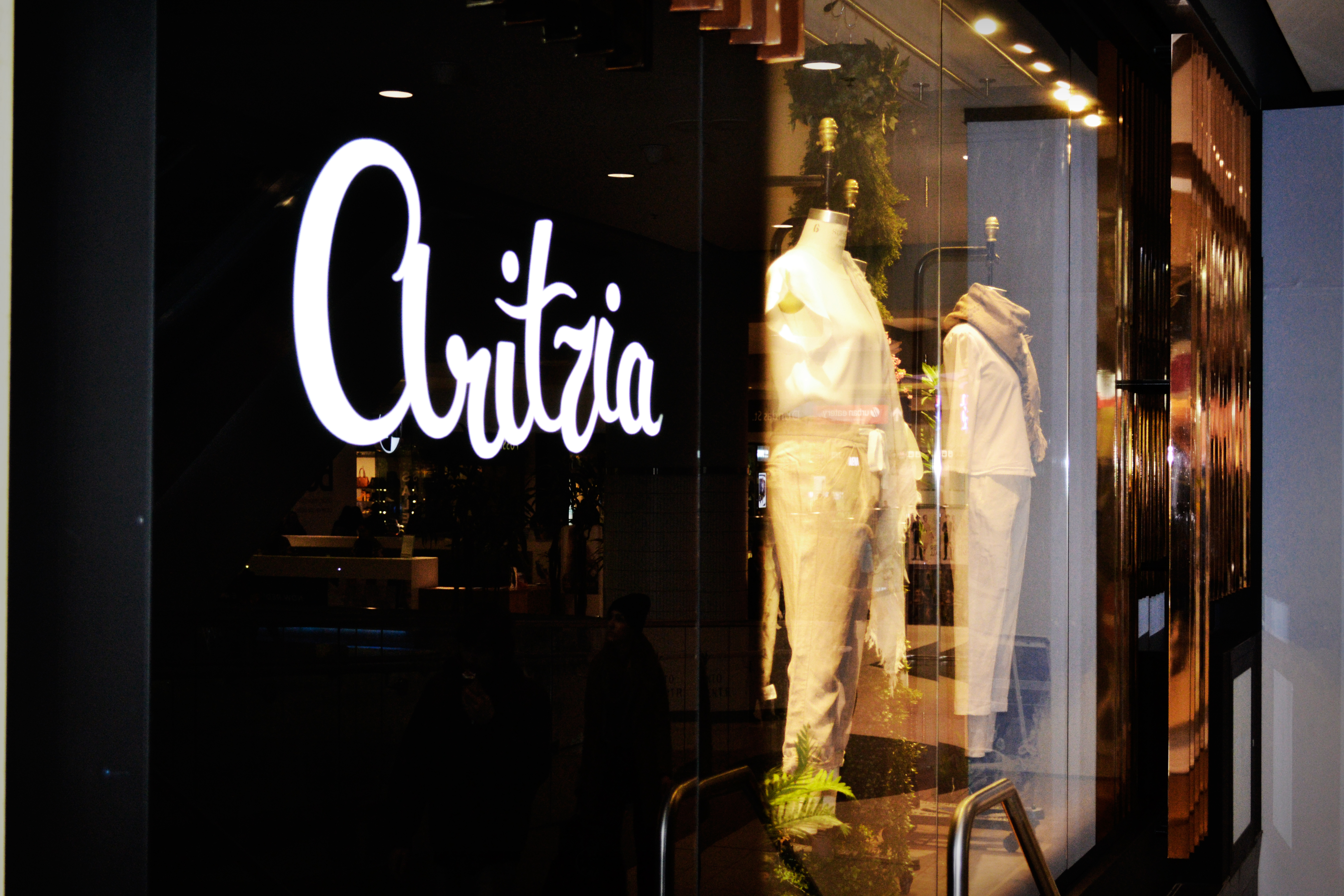
Brands like Aritzia target middle-class consumers and brand themselves as more exclusive but still remains affordable

Affordable affluence refers to a cultural phenomenon where consumers use accessible luxury goods and lifestyles to project status and align themselves with a higher social class, without requiring substantial wealth. This concept is embodied by brands such as Aritzia and Erewhon, which position themselves as offering high-end, trendy, or health-conscious products that are relatively accessible to the average consumer.

A related concept is quiet luxury, where the ultra-wealthy signal wealth through subtle means. Quiet luxury emphasizes the widening gap between the ultra-wealthy and the general public, whereas accessible affluence provides a way for the general public to indulge in the lifestyle of the ultra-wealthy.

== Origin of the term ==
An early use of the phrase in this context in a 2023 article in The Cut called "Meet the People Working 3 Jobs to Afford Erewhon." One of the interviewees used Erewhon as an archetype of affordable affluence. It was described as “a way for regular people to position themselves adjacent to the upper class.”

== Background and description ==
The phenomenon arises due to an individual's desire to showcase status. For years, companies have strategized how to target the average consumers by providing a product that signals an elevated social status. For instance, Aritzia partnered with celebrities and micro-influencers to make it an aspirational brand at an affordable cost. Erewhon similarly has allowed middle class consumers to subtly signal a higher degree of perceived wealth by purchasing higher priced, but still attainable items. It has allowed middle-class individuals to feel as though they are part of an exclusive culture.

This phenomenon has been seen particularly with Gen Z and Millennials in the setting of financial hardships in the 2020s. Affordable affluence is an example of the lipstick effect. Because traditional status symbols such as expensive cars became relatively more unattainable, posting clips on social media that showcase affordable affluence become an alternative status symbol. Particularly with food, the perception has evolved from a necessity to a luxury. A McKinsey & Company report demonstrated that these generations place a higher importance on groceries than restaurants, travel, and beauty/fashion.

== See also ==
- Luxury goods
- Quiet luxury
