= Monthly Full Report on Manufacturers' Shipments, Inventories, and Orders =

Monthly United States government economic report

The United States Census Bureau's Monthly Full Report on Manufacturers' Shipments, Inventories, and Orders, more commonly called the Factory Orders report, totals the dollar volume of new orders, shipments, unfilled orders, and inventories reported by domestic manufacturers.

Figures within the Factory Orders report are reported in the billions of dollars and also in a percent change from the previous month. Generally the Factory Orders report is not as widely watched as other economic indicators. The Advance Release on Durable Goods, which usually precedes the Factory Orders report by one week, garners more attention, given that the durable goods report includes orders for capital goods, a proxy for equipment investment.

== See also ==
- Economic reports
