= Men's underwear index =

Economic theory

The men's underwear index (MUI) is an economic index that can supposedly detect the beginnings of a recovery during an economic slump. The premise is that men's underwear are a necessity in normal economic times and sales remain stable. During a severe downturn, demand for these goods changes as new purchases are deferred. Hence, men's purchasing habits for underwear (and that of their spouses on their behalf) is thought to be a good indicator of discretionary spending for consumption at large especially during turnaround periods.

This indicator is noted for being followed by former Federal Reserve Chairman Alan Greenspan.

== See also ==
- Big Mac index
- Hemline index
- Lipstick index
