= New home sales =

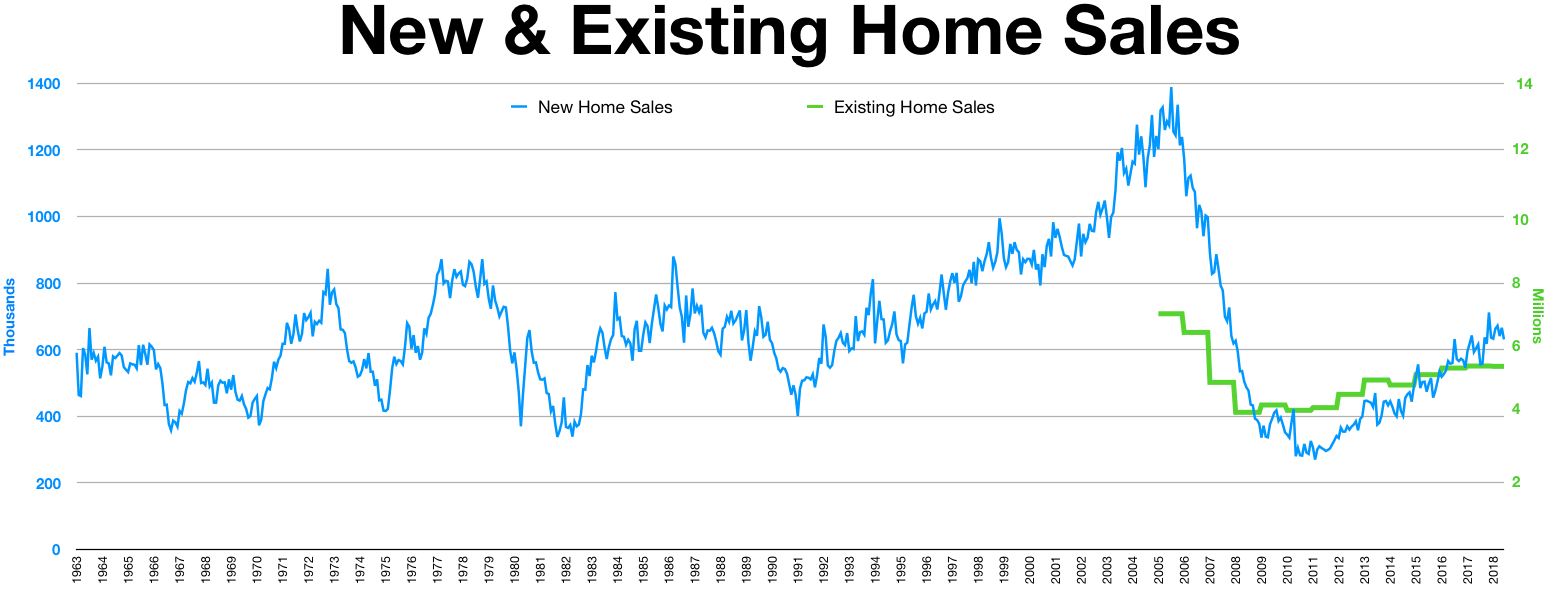
New and existing home sales

New home sales is an economic indicator which records sales of newly constructed residences in the United States of America. The United States Census Bureau publishes new home sales statistics monthly on their website. Statistics are reported as unadjusted monthly rates and seasonally adjusted annual rates.

== Economic significance ==
Because new home sales trigger consumption, they have significant market impact upon release. New home sales also serve as a good indicator of economic turning points due to their consumer income sensitivity. Generally, when economic conditions slow down, new home sales serve as an early indicator of such a depression.

== Limitations ==
Several cautions apply when interpreting new home sales statistics:

- Statistics exclude any new houses that were not built for immediate sale. For example, in the situation where a purchaser commissions a builder to build a house on a lot that the purchaser already owns, this housing unit would not be included in the statistics. Other construction statistics, such as Permits, starts and completions, do include virtually all new residential construction.
- Sales are reported as of the month that a customer signs a sales contract or the builder accepts a deposit. The house can be in any stage of construction.
- Sales are not reduced to account for sales contracts which are subsequently cancelled by the customer or the builder. However, in those situations where a cancellation occurs, the house is not re-counted upon a subsequent sale to another customer.

== See also ==
- Economic reports
- FRED (Federal Reserve Economic Data)
