= Review of Income and Wealth =

- Discipline: Economics
- Language: English
- Edited by: Conchita D'Ambrosio, Robert J. Hill, Stephan Klasen

Publication details
- History: 1951-present
- Publisher: Wiley-Blackwell
- Frequency: Quarterly
- Open access: 1951-2008
- Impact factor: 1.402 (2019)

Standard abbreviations
- ISO 4: Rev. Income Wealth

Indexing
- ISSN: 0034-6586 (print); 1475-4991 (web)
- LCCN: 68130979
- OCLC no.: 01930976

Links
- Journal homepage; Online access; Online archive 1951-2008 (open access)

The Review of Income and Wealth is a peer-reviewed academic journal published by Wiley-Blackwell on behalf of the International Association for Research in Income and Wealth. It was established in 1951 and published annually until 1966, when it became a quarterly.

It aims to provide a venue for research on income and wealth in terms of national and international, economic and social accounting. Its scope includes research on the "development of concepts and definitions for measurement and analysis", the development and "integration of systems of economic and social statistics", and "related methodological problems".

It also covers more applied areas such as international comparisons and the use of economic and social accounting for "budgeting and policy analysis" in different economies.

The editors of the Review are Conchita D'Ambrosio (University of Luxembourg), Robert J. Hill (University of Graz), and Stephan Klasen (University of Göttingen), and its previous editors have included Erik Lundberg, Simon Kuznets, Richard Stone, Raymond Goldsmith, Phyllis Deane, and Colin Clark.

As of August 2024, the new editors are Robert Inklaar (University of Groningen) and Suman Seth (University of Leeds).

The IARIW offers the Kendrick Prizes, named for John Whitefield Kendrick for the best articles published each year in the Review.
