= List of economic reports by U.S. government agencies =

The following reports on economic indicators are reported by United States government agencies:

- Business activity
  - Wholesale Inventories
  - Industrial Production (Federal Reserve)
    - Capacity Utilization
  - Regional Manufacturing Surveys (purchasing managers' organizations and Federal Reserve banks)
    - Philadelphia Fed Index (Federal Reserve Bank of Philadelphia)
  - Construction Spending (U.S. Census Bureau)
- Business inventory
  - Business Inventories (U.S. Census Bureau)
- International
  - International trade (U.S. Census Bureau and the Bureau of Economic Analysis)
    - Trade balance
    - Export prices
  - International Capital Flows (U.S. Treasury Department)
    - Treasury International Capital (TICs)
- Sales
  - Auto and Truck Sales (U.S. Department of Commerce)
    - Auto Sales
    - Truck Sales
  - Retail sales (U.S. Census Bureau)
- Orders
  - Durable Goods Orders (U.S. Census Bureau)
  - Factory Orders (U.S. Census Bureau)
- Real estate
  - Housing Starts and Building Permits (U.S. Census Bureau)
    - Building permits
    - Housing starts
  - New Home Sales (U.S. Census Bureau)
- Production
  - GDP (Gross Domestic Product) (Bureau of Economic Analysis)
  - Productivity and Costs (Bureau of Labor Statistics)
- Consumer
  - Consumer Credit (Federal Reserve)
  - Employment Cost Index (U.S. Department of Labor)
  - Personal Income and Consumption (Bureau of Economic Analysis)
    - Personal Income
- Employment
  - The Employment Report (Bureau of Labor Statistics)
    - Hourly Earnings
    - Nonfarm Payrolls
  - Initial Claims
  - Job Openings and Labor Turnover Survey (Bureau of Labor Statistics)
    - Quits Rate
- Price increase ("inflation")
  - CPI (Consumer Price Index) (Bureau of Labor Statistics)
  - PPI (Producer Price Index) (Bureau of Labor Statistics)
- Government
  - Treasury Budget (U.S. Treasury Department)
- Monetary
  - M2 (Federal Reserve Board)
