= Export Price Index =

The Export Price Index (EPI) tracks changes in the price which firms and countries receive for products they export.

Increases in the EPI are typically due to strong foreign demand or higher internal costs within the exporter's country.

Generally, only increases in the EPI are typically due to strong foreign demand for goods, which pushes up the prices received by exporters, or due to higher internal costs such as increased production costs that are passed on in export prices. Export price indexes reflect these price changes for goods and services sold to foreign markets and are used by economists to assess international competitiveness and trade dynamics. Higher export prices relative to import prices can improve measures like the terms of trade, but their overall effect on economic welfare is debated, as relative price changes can have differing impacts on export volumes, inflation, and national income.

== Calculation and methodology ==
Export price indices measure the average change over time in the prices of goods and services sold by domestic producers to foreign buyers. They are typically compiled as part of broader import-and-export price index programs maintained by national statistical offices, which collect price data from exporters and other market sources to reflect changes in export prices over a defined base period.

Statistical agencies generally construct export price indices using weighted averages of price changes for a representative basket of exported goods and services. The weights reflect the relative importance of each category in total export value during the base period. By holding quantities constant, the export price index isolates *pure* price changes and is often used to deflate nominal export values in national accounts and to analyse trends in export competitiveness and inflation at the producer level.

== See also ==
Economic reports
