= Beatrice N. Vaccara =

American economist

Beatrice N. Vaccara (died January 7, 1983) was an American economist and economic statistician who worked for the United States Department of Commerce as head of the Bureau of Industrial Economics.

== Education and career ==
Vaccara was born in Brooklyn, earned a bachelor's degree from Brooklyn College, and completed a master's degree at Columbia University, in economics. She worked at the United States Department of Agriculture and then, from 1954 to 1959, at the Brookings Institution, before joining the Department of Commerce. From 1977 to 1980 she worked at the United States Department of the Treasury before returning to Commerce to lead the Bureau of Industrial Economics.

== Books ==
Vaccara wrote Employment and Output in Protected Manufacturing Industries (Brookings Institution, 1960). With Walter S. Salant, she was a coauthor of Import Liberalization and Employment: The Effects of Unilateral Reductions in United States Import Barriers (Brookings Institution, 1961).

With John Whitefield Kendrick, she edited New Developments in Productivity Measurement and Analysis (University of Chicago Press, 1980).

== Recognition ==
Vaccara was a recipient of the Department of Commerce Gold Medal in 1974 and of the Presidential Distinguished Executive Award. In 1970, she became a Fellow of the American Statistical Association.

In 1983, the Business and Economic Statistics section of the American Statistical Association gave her their Julius Shiskin Award "for her major contributions to economic statistics including the development and application of input/output modeling and improvements to the system of business cycle indicators and for her leadership and direction of practical, policy oriented economic analysis."
