= Borg-Warner Trophy =

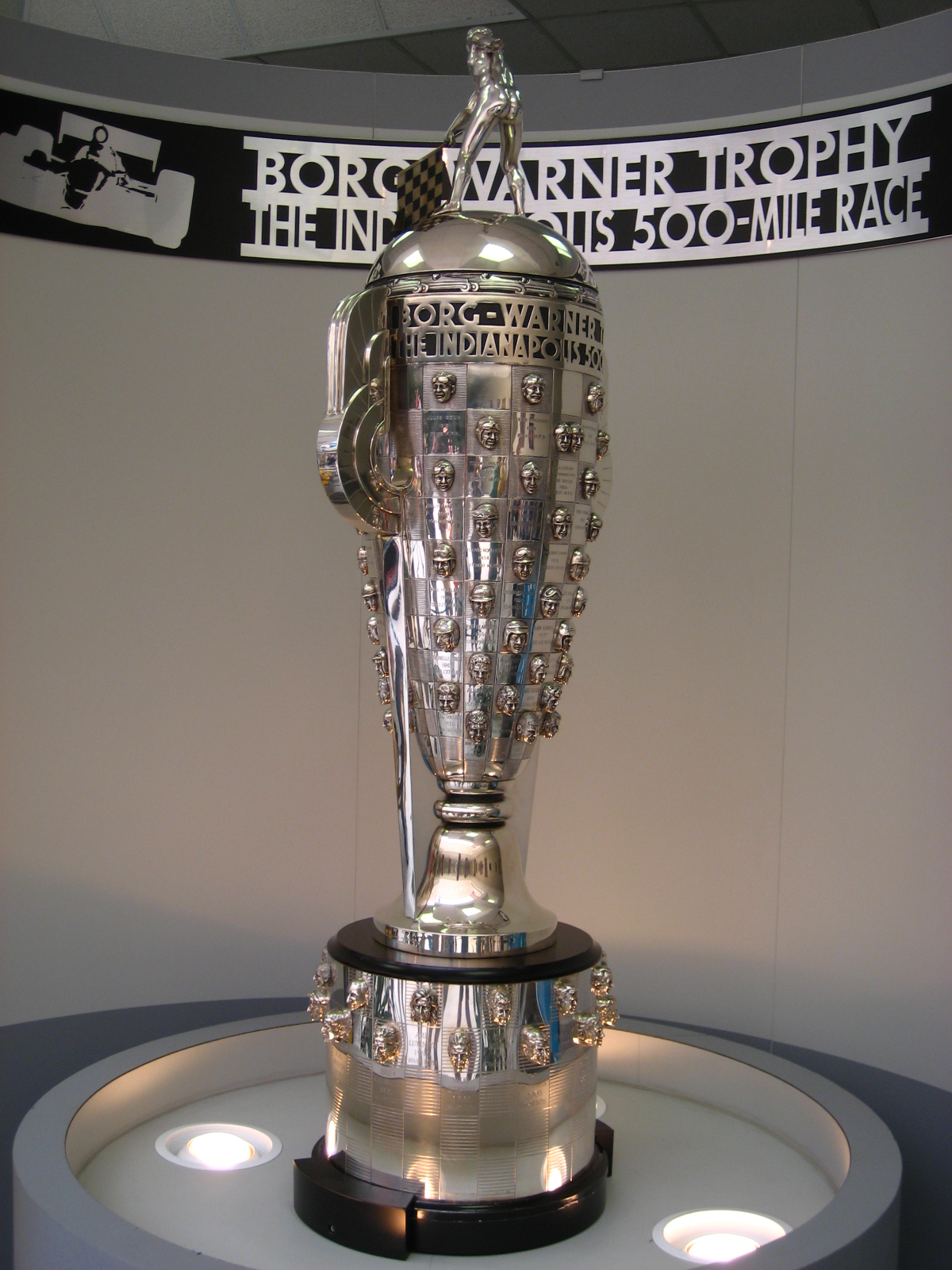
- The Borg-Warner Trophy on display at the Indianapolis Motor Speedway Museum prior to the museum’s renovation in 2023
- Awarded for: Winner of the Indianapolis 500
- Sponsored by: BorgWarner
- Location: Indianapolis Motor Speedway
- Country: United States
- Reward: Miniature trophy replica
- First award: 1936
- Currently held by: Felix Rosenqvist

Highlights
- Most awards: (4) A. J. Foyt, Al Unser, Rick Mears, Helio Castroneves
- Website: BorgWarner.com

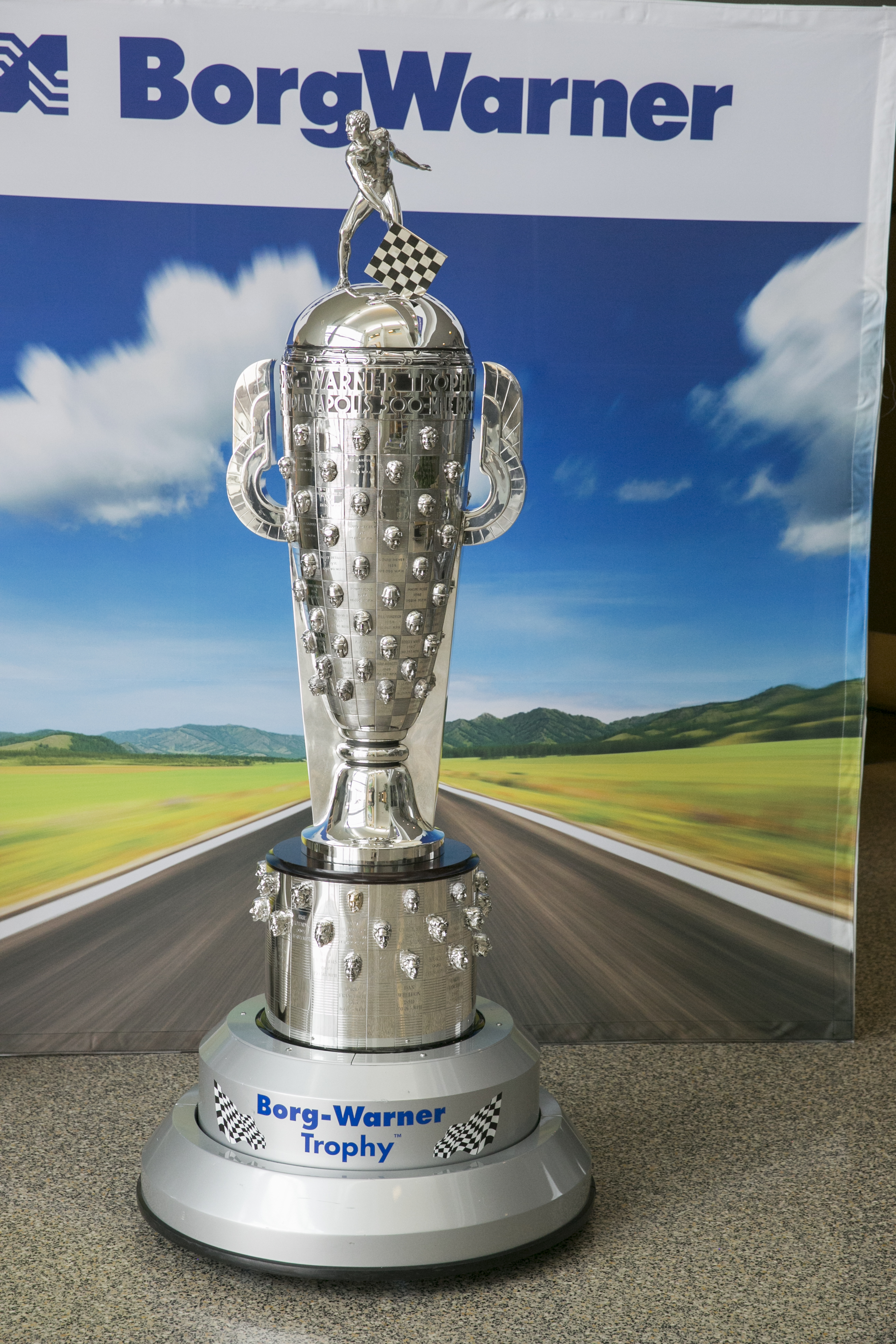
The Borg-Warner Trophy - circa 2015 on display at the BorgWarner Powertrain Technical Center (now the Propulsion Technical Center) in Auburn Hills, Michigan - USA

The Borg-Warner Trophy is the trophy presented to the winner of the Indianapolis 500. It is named for and was commissioned by automotive supplier BorgWarner. It is permanently housed at the Indianapolis Motor Speedway Museum in Speedway, Indiana. Unveiled at a 1936 dinner hosted by then-Speedway owner Eddie Rickenbacker, the trophy was officially declared the annual prize for Indianapolis 500 victors. It was first presented at the 24th annual 500-mile race, where Louis Meyer, that year's champion and its first recipient, soon thereafter remarked, "Winning the Borg-Warner Trophy is like winning an Olympic medal."

Felix Rosenqvist won the 2026 Indianapolis 500, and is the current reigning champion. Each year, the winning driver is presented with a miniature replica ("Baby Borg") during a reception, which for the 2019 race was presented in early September, about three months after the race. Prior to the trophy's inception, the Strauss Trophy (first awarded in 1919) was once presented to the winner. The Wheeler-Schebler Trophy was awarded to the leader at the 400-mile mark, but was retired when car owner Harry Hartz claimed it three times.

== History ==
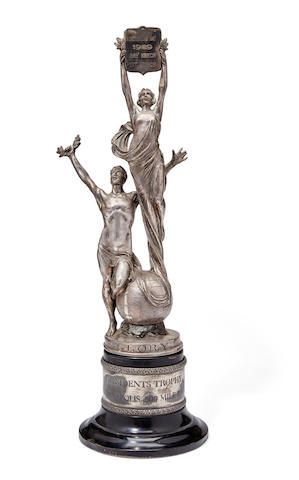
The pre-Borg-Warner Indianapolis 500 winner's trophy awarded to Ray Keech in 1929

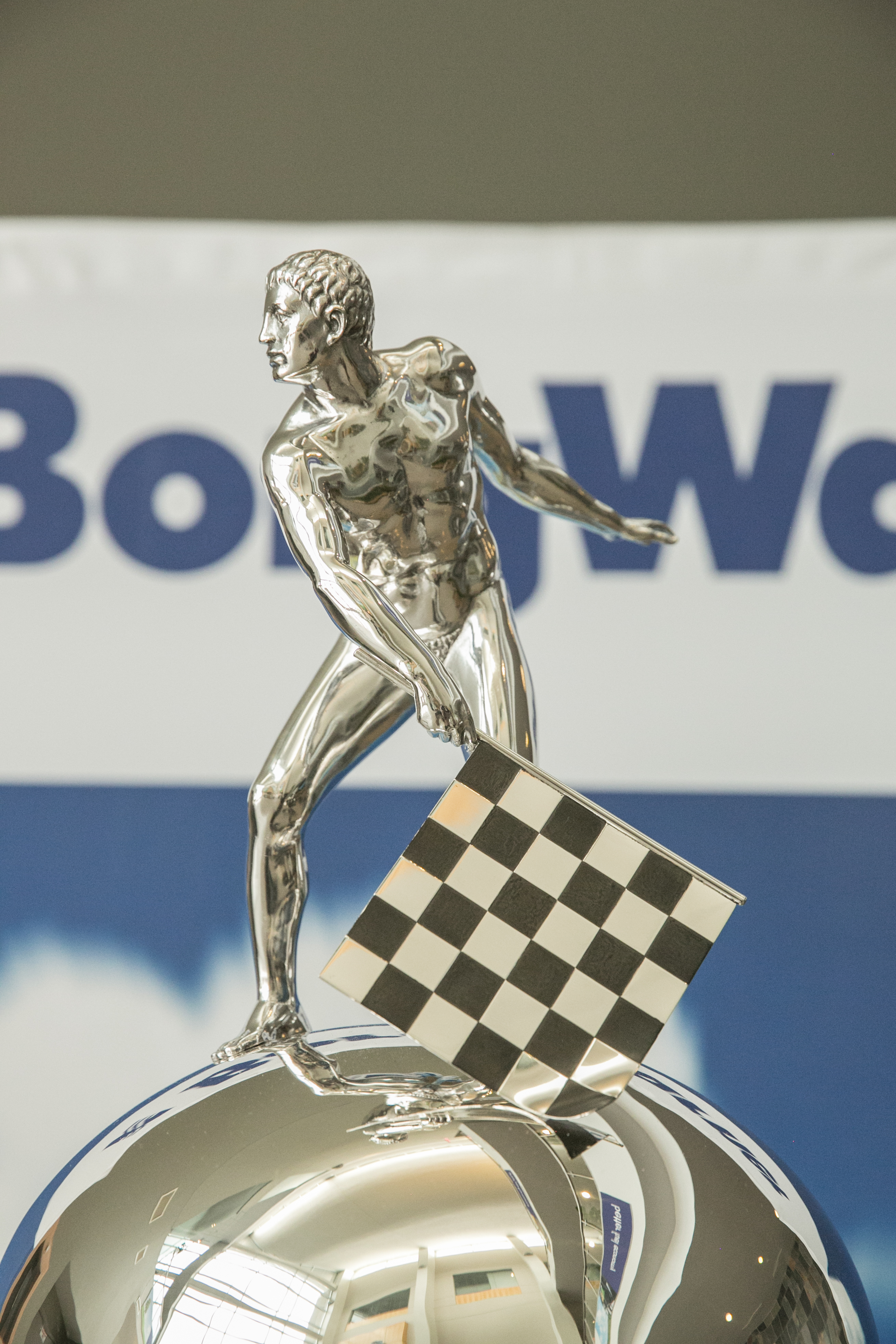
Detail of the image of a man on the top of the Borg-Warner Trophy. Because this man is depicted naked, after the traditional depiction of athletes in ancient Greek art, the trophy is most often photographed at an angle so that the man's arm blocks the view of the figure's genitalia.

The trophy, which has been presented in the winner's circle after every race since 1936, is a very large, multi-tiered item which bears the high relief sculpture of the likeness of each driver to have won the race since its inception in 1911. Inscribed are the winner's name, year of victory, and average speed. This information is alternated with the faces in a checkerboard pattern, evoking a checkered flag. Included on the base is the gold likeness of Tony Hulman, owner of the Indianapolis Motor Speedway from 1945 to 1977. On the top of the trophy is an unclothed man waving a checkered flag. Because this man is depicted naked, after the traditional depiction of athletes in ancient Greek art, the trophy is most often photographed at an angle so that the man's arm blocks the view of the figure's genitalia.

In 1935, the Borg-Warner Automotive Company commissioned designer Robert J. Hill and Gorham, Inc., of Providence, Rhode Island to create the trophy at a cost of $10,000. The trophy underwent a refurbishment in 1991 and again in 2004. Today it is insured in excess of $1.3 million.

== Design ==
Made of sterling silver, the trophy is just under 5 feet 4 inches (163 cm) tall and weighs nearly 153 pounds (69 kg). The trophy body itself is hollow, and the dome-shaped top is removable. From 1936 to 1985, the trophy appeared in its original form, with the bottom rim of the body serving as its stand. The original body had room for 70 winners of the Indy 500, and was destined to fill up after the 1986 winner was affixed. During the early years, the trophy was polished often for protection, but appeared too seldom be buffed to a glossy "mirror finish" and often was seen with a dull or matte finish. At no point has the trophy been allowed to fall in a state of tarnish or major disrepair. When the race was suspended during World War II, the trophy was stored in a secure location.

A base was added in 1986 to accommodate more winners, similar to what has been done with the Stanley Cup. In 1991, the trophy went through a thorough restoration. In 2004, the first base was removed, and replaced with a new, larger base to accommodate more winners. Enough space is currently available to hold all winners through 2033.

Since 1990 the winning drivers' likenesses on both the Borg-Warner Trophy and the replica trophies have been sculpted by prominent American sculptor William Behrends, who also created the statue of baseball great Willie Mays that stands at the entrance to Oracle Park in San Francisco.

== Baby Borg ==
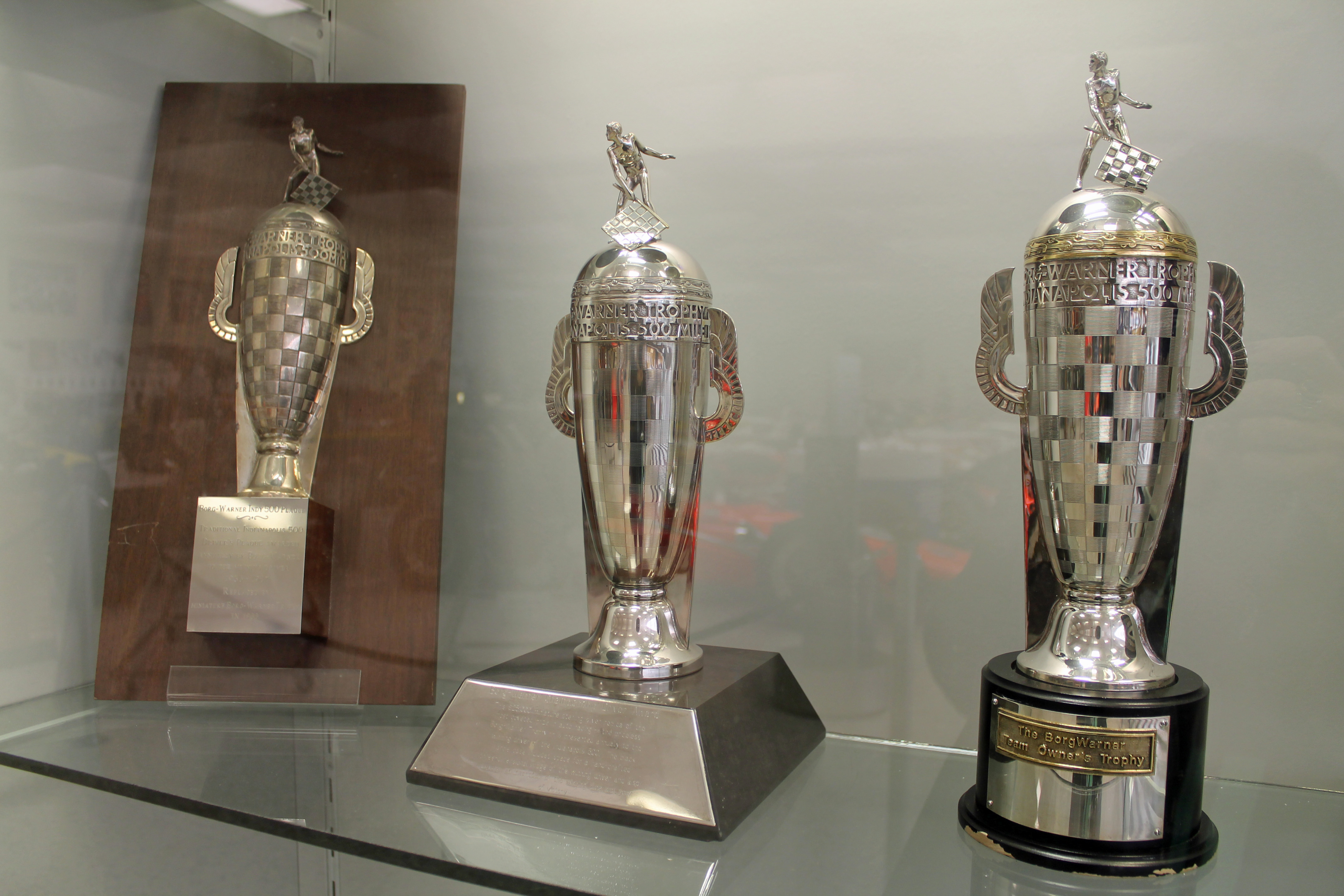
Trophy replicas; the award on the left was given to winners from 1936 to 1987. The award in the center is the current trophy replica presented to the winning driver.

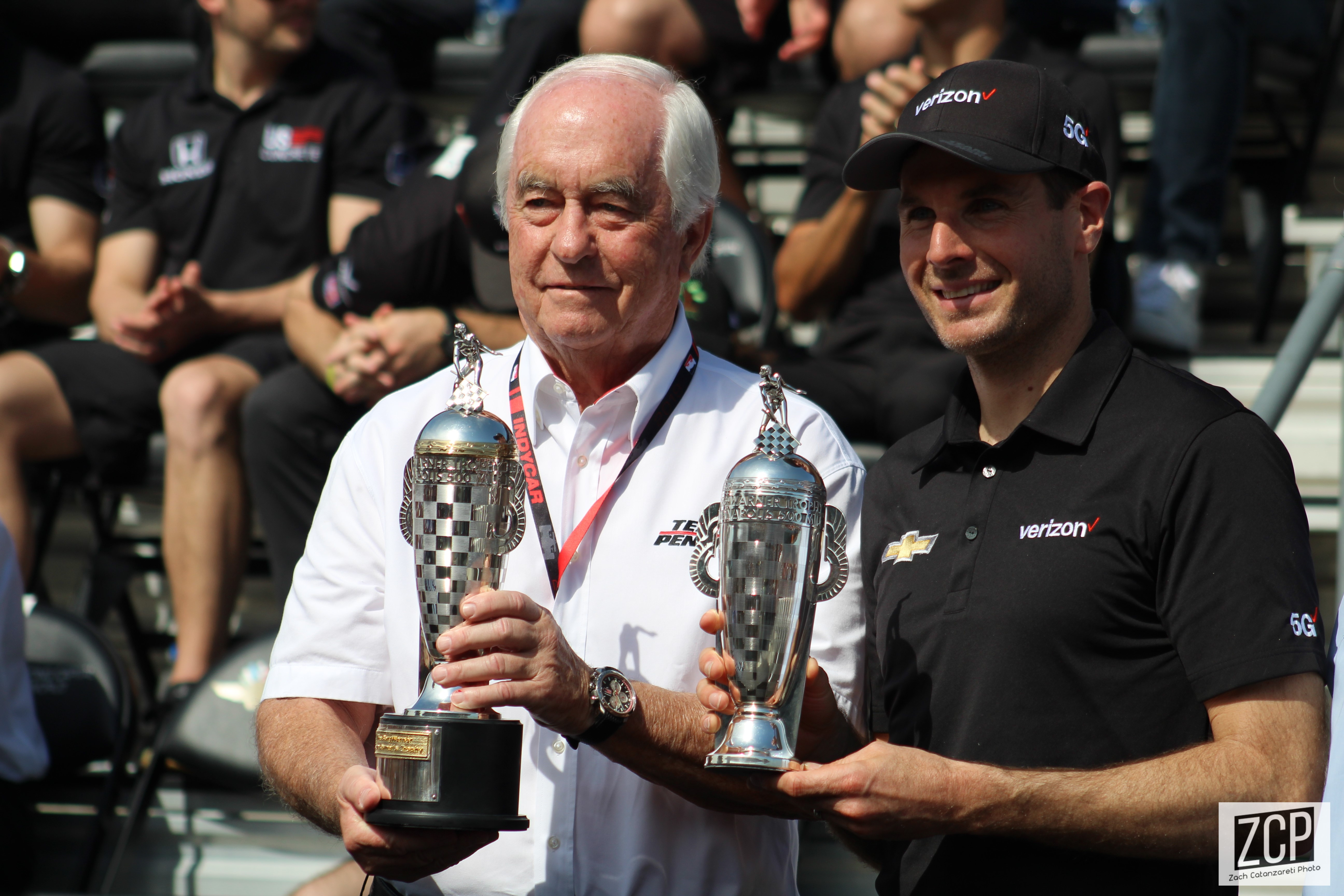
2018 Indianapolis 500 winner Will Power with Roger Penske holding Baby Borgs.

The actual perpetual trophy is not given to the winner; it remains at the Indianapolis Motor Speedway Museum on the grounds of the Indianapolis Motor Speedway. The winning drivers since 1988 have been presented with an 18-inch (460 mm) tall free-standing replica of the trophy, sitting on a beveled square base. Officially titled the "Indianapolis 500 Champion Driver's Trophy", it has been affectionately nicknamed the "Baby Borg". The Baby Borg is typically presented the following January at a Speedway reception or sometimes at the North American International Auto Show in Detroit, near trophy sponsor BorgWarner's headquarters.

Starting with the 1997 race, a second Baby Borg was added, presented to the winning car owner(s), officially named the "Indianapolis 500 Champion Owner's Trophy". The owner's trophy is nearly identical to the driver's trophy, except it is mounted upon a round base. Multiple owner's trophies are presented if there are co-owners to the winning team.

The bas-relief likenesses from the main trophy are not replicated on the Baby Borgs, nor is the cylindrical base of the main trophy (the first of which was added in 1986). In some years, a duplicate of the sculpted likeness of the winner has been affixed to the beveled base of the driver's Baby Borg trophy. The driver's trophy can be lifted from its base if desired.

Prior to 1988, winners received a 24-inch (610 mm) upright model of the trophy mounted on a walnut plaque. Since then, some pre-1988 winners have been presented with the newer Baby Borg version. In 2011, race winner Dan Wheldon was fatally injured before he received his Baby Borg. His widow Susie accepted the trophy in his honor.

In 2003, 3-time champion Bobby Unser was awarded the newer Champion Driver's Trophy in a surprise event for the 2002 race winner Hélio Castroneves's celebration. Since 2013, starting with Parnelli Jones (the 1963 winner), the Speedway began a tradition of presenting living winners the newer Champion Driver's Trophy on the 50th anniversary of their wins had they not been awarded a Baby Borg. Jones, Mario Andretti (2019), and Al Unser Sr. (2020) have each been awarded with such on the 50th anniversaries of their wins. Since then, it has been given to different drivers who had not been awarded a Baby Borg, regardless of the number of years since their win. In 2021, Gordon Johncock was awarded Baby Borgs to represent his 1973 and 1982 wins at his Johncock Forestry Products business in South Branch, Michigan during a birthday party organised by BorgWarner. In 2022, A. J. Foyt, who has an owner's Baby Borg from 1999, was awarded a driver's Baby Borg, without the sculpted likeness, but with each side carrying one of his four wins, in 2022. In 2023, William Behrends was given a Baby Borg by BorgWarner in celebration of being the artist on the past 33 Indianapolis 500 winners, as traditionally the field consists of 33 cars.

While the perpetual trophy is not given to the winner, it has, on occasion, traveled to various locations to honor the winner. In 2017, the trophy traveled to Japan accompanying Takuma Sato on a victory tour of his home country, and went on display in Sweden after Marcus Ericsson's win in 2022.

Odd features have been put on the driver's likeness on the "Baby Borg" since it was introduced in 1988. In 2013, Parnelli Jones's trophy featured a cowboy hat on his head (prior to 1970, champions were wearing an open-face helmet on their sculptures; since the bas-relief bust of the driver was newly created by Behrends, it was done without helmet and with the cowboy hat he wore primarily during that season). In 2019, because of fan requests, Simon Pagenaud's Baby Borg also featured the likeness of his Jack Russell Terrier Norman. BorgWarner added a donation to the Humane Society of Indiana as part of the event, primarily because the dog had participated in the winner's circle photos.

== Lore ==
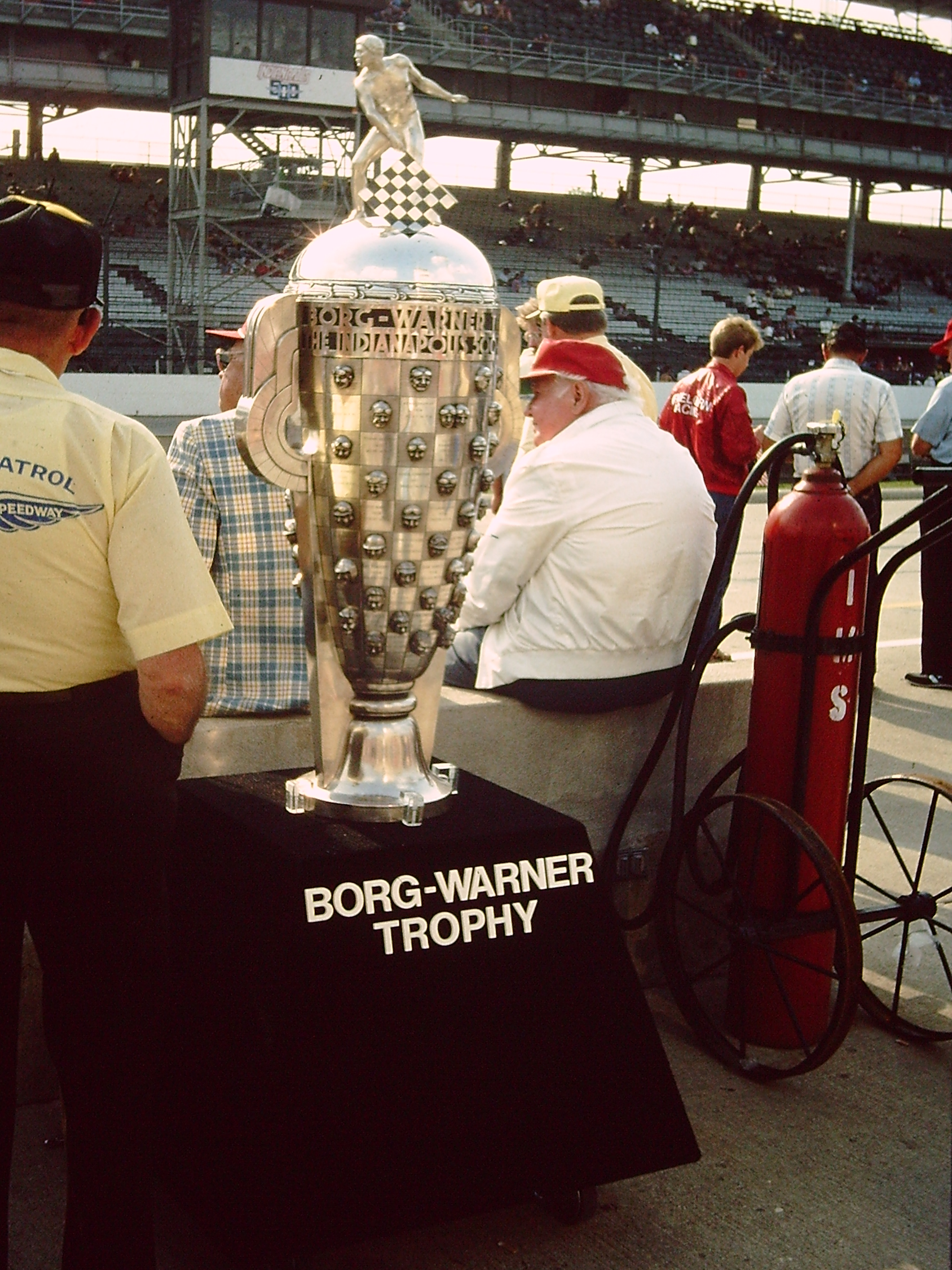
The Borg-Warner Trophy in its original form (without a base) on display in 1985.

The trophy has had quite a history; track historian Donald Davidson has noted a particular story in which a Butler University student was given the trophy to watch in the 1930s before race day. The young man hid the trophy under his bed one night and proceeded to have a night out. Upon his return to his fraternity house, the man found the trophy missing. He looked and looked and became very worried about the trophy's whereabouts. Upon looking in the frat house's basement, he found the trophy surrounded by men who were drinking beer out of it. All of 115 beers were inside of the trophy. Emptying the beer, he wondered how he would get the smell off of the trophy and decided to take a shower – taking the trophy in with him.

The winner of the 1950 Indianapolis 500, Johnnie Parsons, had his name misspelled on the trophy. It was scripted into the silver as "Johnny" Parsons (which incidentally, is how his son's name was spelled). Evidence of the engraver's mistake can be seen in MGM’s 1950 movie To Please a Lady. In a scene in which they filmed the trophy and feature a shot of Johnnie Parsons's bust image, his name is clearly misspelled. During the 1991 restoration, it was proposed by the handlers to correct the spelling, even though Parsons had died seven years earlier. The decision was made to leave the misspelling in place as part of the trophy's historic lore.

Through 1985, the trophy was hoisted by handlers directly behind the driver, typically on the roll bar of the car. The trophy could be easily carried by one individual, and was usually simple to transport. After the trophy was affixed with a base in 1986, the trophy's weight, height, and stability became an issue with displaying it on top of the car. At least two men were required to balance the trophy behind the driver. Since about 2004, when the trophy was expanded with the newer base, it is no longer hoisted behind the driver. Initially, the now-heavier trophy was displayed next to the car. However, the trophy was often mired in the tight, crowded confines of victory lane, and became less visible and even risked damage due to the bustling, celebrating crowd. For 2012, coinciding with the introduction of the DW-12 chassis, a special platform was constructed that fits between or behind the rear wheels and rear wing of the cars. The trophy is now placed upon this platform during the victory lane celebration, giving it once again a prominent and more visible presence during the celebration.

Two or more safety patrol workers are assigned with guarding and transporting the trophy during the month of May. It is polished often, and polished several times during the month of May. In contrast to the earlier years, the trophy is almost exclusively polished and buffed to an elegant, glossy, "mirror finish." During routine times of the month, it is usually situated upon a large, sturdy, custom-built rolling dolly.

== Legacy ==
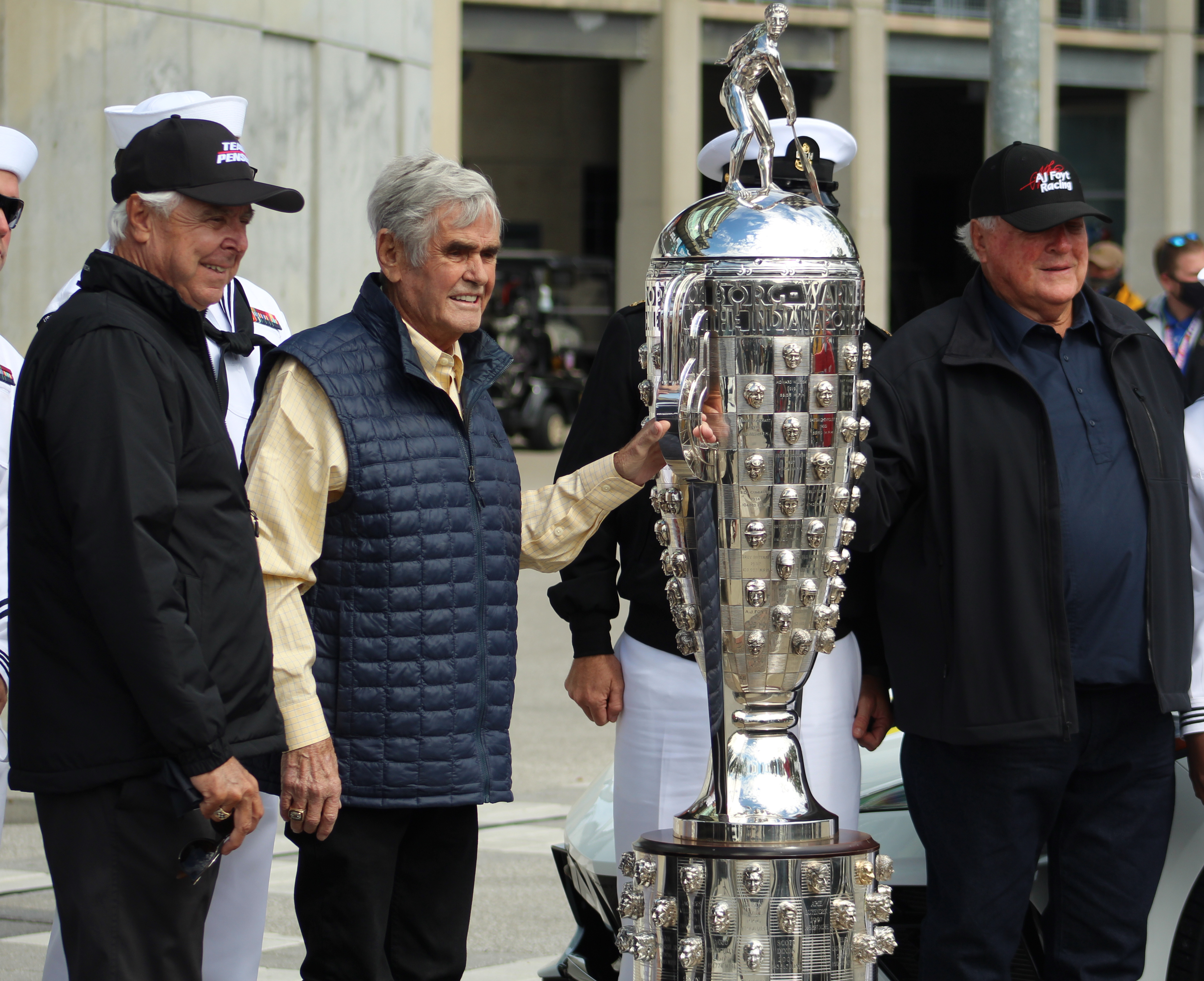
Indianapolis 500's four-time winners, Rick Mears, Al Unser, and A. J. Foyt with the Borg-Warner Trophy

The trophy has appeared in several films, including Winning (1969), starring Paul Newman, and Turbo (2013), starring Ryan Reynolds. During the month of May, the trophy has several prominent locations for display. During time trials, the trophy is typically displayed outdoors on a platform near the start/finish line. During down times, it returns to the museum. It also makes several appearances, including the Public Drivers' Meeting and the 500 Festival Parade, as well as prominent social events and gatherings (such as banquets and balls downtown).

The Borg-Warner Trophy was exclusively featured on the cover of the Indianapolis 500 Official Program in 1981, 1998, and 2002. It also appeared on the cover in lesser prevalence in 1988, 1996, and 2006. It is depicted in the cover art of the Atari video game Indy 500, in the Midway pinball machine Indianapolis 500, and on the cover art for the Papyrus IndyCar Racing Indianapolis Motor Speedway Expansion Pack.

== Layout and details ==
When the trophy debuted in 1936, it was complete with the likenesses of all winners from 1911 to 1935 (except 1917–1918, as the race was not held those two years due to World War I). Sculptor John Grawe created the twenty-four likenesses representing the first 23 races, including the two co-winners for the 1924 race. Twenty-two of the likenesses were created featuring the driver wearing his helmet and goggles. Two faces, those of 1912 winner Joe Dawson and 1921 winner Tommy Milton, showed the driver without a helmet.

The likenesses were placed beginning with 1911 winner Ray Harroun situated in the middle square of the first row of the front side. Subsequent faces were added encircling the trophy to the right, however the starting squares for each row varied.

The Borg-Warner Trophy on display at the Indianapolis Motor Speedway Museum in 2022.

When the winners began to be added annually after 1936, most through 1970 were depicted wearing an open-face helmet. Floyd Davis, who co-won the 1941 race with Mauri Rose, was depicted without a helmet, while Rose was depicted with one. By 1946, most were shown without their goggles. The likeness of 1957 winner Sam Hanks was the final one to feature goggles. The likeness of 1970 winner Al Unser is the last to be depicted wearing a helmet (by that time, drivers were wearing full-face helmets, so depicting helmets on drivers was not feasible). When he won again the following year, his 1971 likeness was shown with natural hair. It has been standard practice to sculpt a brand new likeness for repeat winners, including drivers who have won in consecutive years.

The likeness of 1986 winner Bobby Rahal originally featured miniature glasses, as Rahal wore glasses at the time. The tiny spectacles were crafted from metal wire. In 1993, the trophy was reportedly bumped and the glasses fell off the trophy and were broken. The glasses were repaired and later reattached. Rahal failed to qualify for the 1993 race, and some superstitious observers pointed out the incident as a bad omen. The glasses were removed permanently after Rahal started wearing contacts in the mid-1990s. Tom Sneva, the 1983 winner, insisted his likeness include glasses, and they remain to this day.

Two drivers, both of whom are multiple winners, have their respective names depicted differently in different years. Four-time winner Al Unser has his name listed as "Al Unser" for his likenesses of 1970, 1971, and 1978. He is listed as "Al Unser Sr." for his 1987 win, owing much to the fact that his son (two-time winner Al Unser Jr.) was now a driver. Two-time winner Juan Pablo Montoya is listed as "Juan Montoya" for 2000 and as "Juan Pablo Montoya" for 2015.

=== Front side ===
| | Howard Wilcox; 1919; 88.06 M.P.H | | Ray Harroun; 1911; 74.59 M.P.H | | Joe Dawson; 1912; 74.7 M.P.H | |
| Frank Lockhart; 1926; 95.885 M.P.H | | Gaston Chevrolet; 1920; 88.50 M.P.H | | Tommy Milton; 1921; 89.62 M.P.H | | Jimmy Murphy; 1922; 94.48 M.P.H |
| | George Souders; 1927; 97.54 M.P.H | | Louis Meyer; 1928; 99.482 M.P.H | | Ray Keech; 1929; 97.585 M.P.H | |
| Bill Cummings; 1934; 104.863 M.P.H | | Kelly Petillo; 1935; 106.240 M.P.H | | Louis Meyer; 1936; 109.069 M.P.H | | Wilbur Shaw; 1937; 113.580 M.P.H |
| | George Robson; 1946; 114.820 M.P.H | | Mauri Rose; 1947; 116.338 M.P.H | | Mauri Rose; 1948; 119.814 M.P.H | |
| Troy Ruttman; 1952; 128.922 M.P.H | | Bill Vukovich; 1953; 128.740 M.P.H | | Bill Vukovich; 1954; 130.840 M.P.H | | Bob Sweikert; 1955; 128.209 M.P.H |
| | Jim Rathmann; 1960; 138.767 M.P.H | | A. J. Foyt; 1961; 139.130 M.P.H | | Rodger Ward; 1962; 140.293 M.P.H | |
| A. J. Foyt; 1967; 151.207 M.P.H | | Bobby Unser; 1968; 152.882 M.P.H | | Mario Andretti; 1969; 156.867 M.P.H | | Al Unser; 1970; 155.949 M.P.H |
| | Bobby Unser; 1975; 149.213 M.P.H | | Johnny Rutherford; 1976; 148.728 M.P.H | | A. J. Foyt; 1977; 161.831 M.P.H | |
| Tom Sneva; 1983; 162.117 M.P.H | | Rick Mears; 1984; 163.612 M.P.H | | Danny Sullivan; 1985; 152.882 M.P.H | | Bobby Rahal; 1986; 170.722 M.P.H |

=== Back side ===
| Jules Goux; 1913; 76.92 M.P.H | | Rene Thomas; 1914; 82.47 M.P.H | | Ralph De Palma; 1915; 89.84 M.P.H | | Dario Resta; 1916; 83.26 M.P.H |
| | Tommy Milton; 1923; 90.95 M.P.H | | L.L. Corum; Joe Boyer; 1924; 90.23 M.P.H | | Peter DePaolo; 1925; 101.13 M.P.H | |
| Billy Arnold; 1930; 100.446 M.P.H | | Louis Schneider; 1931; 96.629 M.P.H | | Fred Frame; 1932; 104.144 M.P.H | | Louis Meyer; 1933; 104.162 M.P.H |
| | Floyd Roberts; 1938; 117.200 M.P.H | | Wilbur Shaw; 1939; 115.035 M.P.H | | Wilbur Shaw; 1940; 114.277 M.P.H | |
| Bill Holland; 1949; 121.327 M.P.H | | Johnny Parsons; 1950; 124.002 M.P.H | | Lee Wallard; 1951; 126.244 M.P.H | | Floyd Davis; Mauri Rose; 1941; 115.117 M.P.H |
| | Pat Flaherty; 1956; 128.490 M.P.H | | Sam Hanks; 1957; 135.601 M.P.H | | Jimmy Bryan; 1958; 133.791 M.P.H | |
| Parnelli Jones; 1963; 143.137 M.P.H | | A. J. Foyt; 1964; 147.350 M.P.H | | Jim Clark; 1965; 150.686 M.P.H | | Rodger Ward; 1959; 135.837 M.P.H |
| | Al Unser; 1971; 157.735 M.P.H | | Mark Donohue; 1972; 162.962 M.P.H | | Graham Hill; 1966; 144.519 M.P.H | |
| Al Unser; 1978; 161.363 M.P.H | | Rick Mears; 1979; 158.899 M.P.H | | Gordon Johncock; 1973; 158.036 M.P.H | | Johnny Rutherford; 1974; 158.589 M.P.H |
| | Johnny Rutherford; 1980; 142.862 M.P.H | | Bobby Unser; 1981; 139.084 M.P.H | | Gordon Johncock; 1982; 162.829 M.P.H | |

== Base ==
=== First base ===
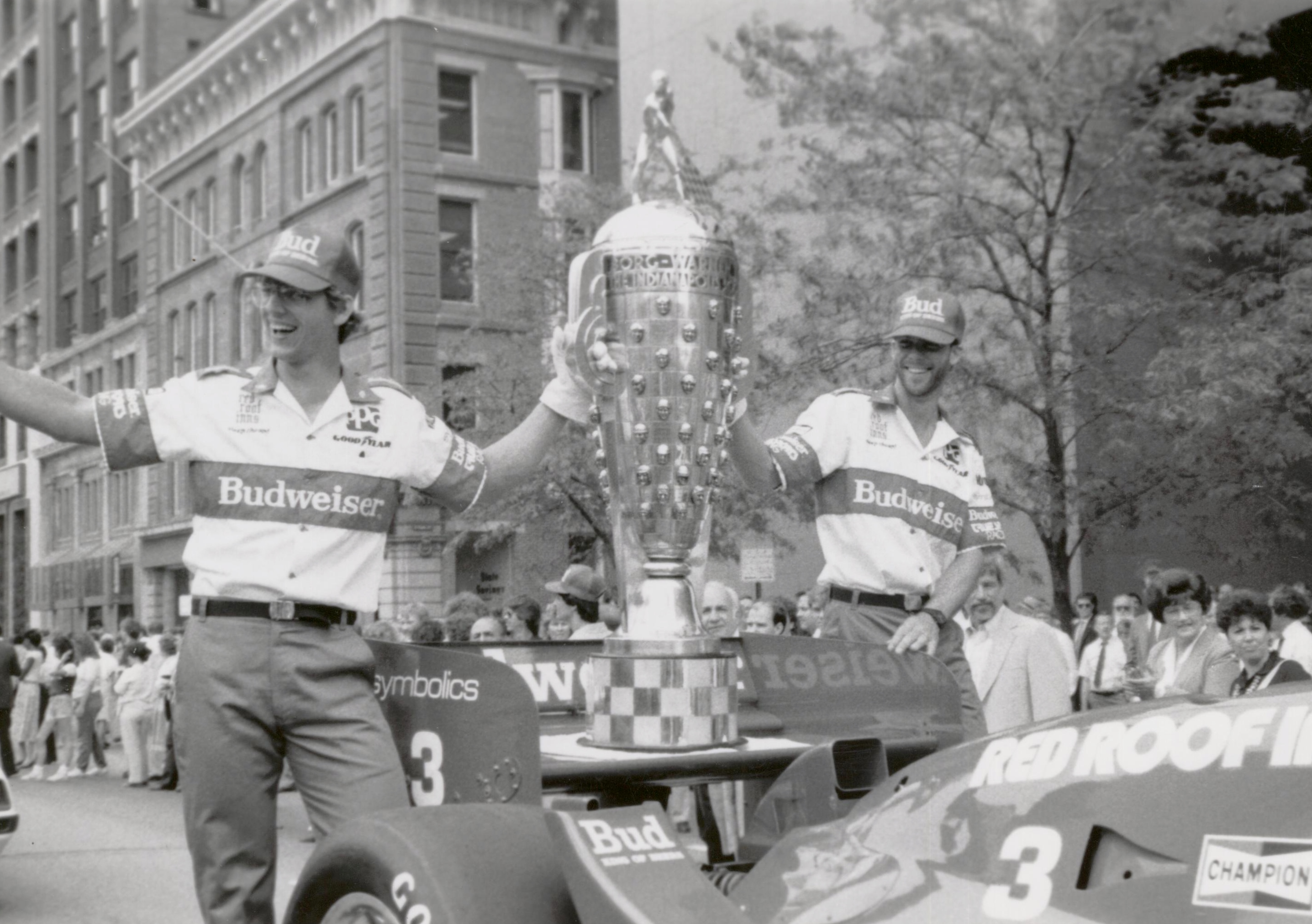
The Borg-Warner Trophy in 1986. The first base that was used from 1986 to 2003 is visible.

Following the 1985 Indianapolis 500, the likeness of race winner Danny Sullivan was added to the trophy. His face filled the 69th of the original 70 squares on the trophy body. Only one square remained on the body, which would be filled by the 1986 winner.

In the weeks prior to the 1986 Indianapolis 500, in celebration of the trophy's 50th anniversary, a new cylindrical three-row base was added to the bottom of the trophy. It featured room for an additional 18 faces. On the base, the first square was filled with a gold likeness of the late Speedway president Tony Hulman. The base increased the height of the trophy to 55 inches (1,400 mm), and the weight to about 95 pounds (43 kg).

The trophy spent the month of May 1986 with one empty square left on the body, and now room for 17 additional winners on the base. The base would have enough room for winners through 2003. Bobby Rahal won the 1986 race, and was the final likeness added to the body of the trophy.

Al Unser won the 1987 race, and became the first race winner to have his likeness added to the first base of the trophy. Unser also became the first winner to have likenesses on the body of the trophy (1970, 1971, 1978) as well as the base (1987). The layout and lettering of the base mimicked that of the trophy body. The driver's name was enscripted in one single line, followed by the year on the next line, and the race average speed below on the third line.

The likeness of 1989 Indianapolis 500 winner Emerson Fittipaldi was created by 88-year old French sculptor Louis Feron, using the repoussé technique. Feron used a single flat sheet of silver and painstakingly hammered it into the shape of Fittipaldi's face.

In 1991, a restoration project was conducted on the trophy. As part of the project, a reinforcement rim was added to the base for stability. The refurbishment increased the height of the trophy to 60 inches (1,500 mm), and the weight to over 110 pounds (50 kg).

The final likeness added to the original base was that of Hélio Castroneves, winner of the 2002 race.

=== Current base ===
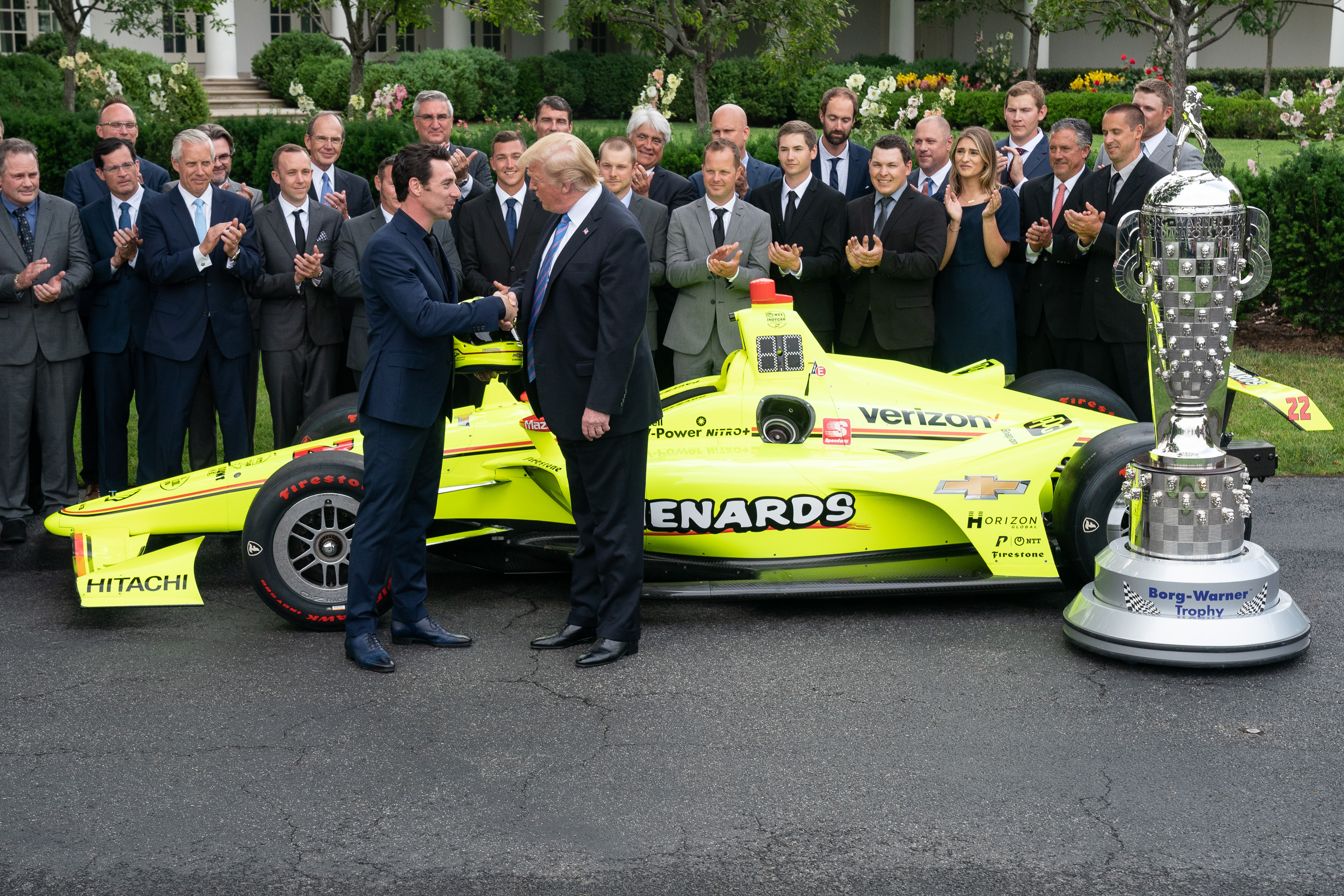
The Borg-Warner Trophy on its current base and dolly seen with 2019 race winner Simon Pageneud and President Donald Trump

Following the 2003 race the first base added in 1986 was removed and replaced with a larger, similar looking one. It consisted of five rows of twelve squares, allowing room for 48 faces. The likenesses of Tony Hulman and the 1987–2002 winners were relocated to the new base. The likeness of 2003 winner Gil de Ferran was the first new face to be added to the new base. The new base added at least 15 pounds (6.8 kg) and more than 4 inches (100 mm) to the trophy, which now stands at 64 1/2 inches (1,640 mm), and weighs nearly 150 pounds (68 kg). The current base is expected to accommodate winners through 2033.

One notable difference on the new base is reflected in the descriptions. All listings on the new base script the driver's first name on the first line, surname on the second line, followed by the year on the third line, and average speed on the fourth line. On the old base, and on the trophy body, the drivers' names are written in one single line.

Due to the increased weight and size of the trophy, it was no longer possible to hoist the trophy atop the winning car in victory lane. Handlers would place the trophy on the ground in victory lane, near the rear of the machine, but this often left the trophy obscured from view by the many people surrounding the car. Likewise in the tight confines of victory lane, the trophy was now susceptible to someone bumping into it, risking damage, requiring special care by the handlers. Starting in 2012, with the introduction of the Dallara DW-12 chassis, a special platform was constructed to display the trophy in a more prominent fashion in victory lane. As soon as the car pulls into victory lane, the customized platform is securely placed behind the rear wing or over one of the rear wheels. The trophy is immediately placed upon the platform, and is displayed in a safer and highly visible location. In addition, during the month when the trophy is displayed trackside, it is typically placed on a decorative dolly for easy transportation.

| Anton; Hulman Jr. Feb. 11, 1901; Oct. 27, 1977 | | Al; Unser Sr. 1987; 162.175 M.P.H | | Rick; Mears; 1988; 144.809 M.P.H | | Emerson; Fittipaldi; 1989; 167.581 M.P.H | | Arie; Luyendyk; 1990; 185.981 M.P.H | | Rick; Mears; 1991; 176.457 M.P.H | | Al; Unser Jr. 1992; 134.477 M.P.H | | Emerson; Fittipaldi; 1993; 157.207 M.P.H | | Al; Unser Jr. 1994; 160.872 M.P.H | | Jacques; Villeneuve; 1995; 153.616 M.P.H | | Buddy; Lazier; 1996; 147.956 M.P.H | | Arie; Luyendyk; 1997; 145.827 M.P.H | |
| | Eddie; Cheever Jr. 1998; 145.155 M.P.H | | Kenny; Brack; 1999; 153.176 M.P.H | | Juan; Montoya; 2000; 167.607 M.P.H | | Helio; Castroneves; 2001; 141.574 M.P.H | | Helio; Castroneves; 2002; 166.499 M.P.H | | Gil de Ferran; 2003; 156.291 M.P.H | | Buddy; Rice; 2004; 138.518 M.P.H | | Dan; Wheldon; 2005; 157.603 M.P.H | | Sam; Hornish, Jr. 2006; 157.085 M.P.H | | Dario; Franchitti; 2007; 151.774 M.P.H | | Scott; Dixon; 2008; 143.567 M.P.H | | Helio; Castroneves; 2009; 150.318 M.P.H |
| Dario; Franchitti; 2010; 161.623 M.P.H | | Dan; Wheldon; 2011; 170.265 M.P.H | | Dario; Franchitti; 2012; 167.734 M.P.H | | Tony; Kanaan; 2013; 187.433 M.P.H | | Ryan; Hunter-Reay; 2014; 186.563 M.P.H | | Juan Pablo; Montoya; 2015; 161.541 M.P.H | | Alexander; Rossi; 2016; 166.634 M.P.H | | Takuma; Sato; 2017; 155.395 M.P.H | | Will; Power; 2018; 166.935 M.P.H | | Simon; Pagenaud; 2019; 175.794 M.P.H | | Takuma; Sato; 2020; 157.824 M.P.H | | Helio; Castroneves; 2021; 190.690 M.P.H | |
| | Josef; Newgarden; 2023; 168.193 M.P.H | | Josef; Newgarden; 2024; 167.763 M.P.H | | Alex; Palou; 2025; 168.883 M.P.H | | Felix; Rosenqvist; 2026; 162.021 M.P.H | | | | | | | | | | | | | | | | Marcus; Ericsson; 2022; 175.428 M.P.H |

== Gallery ==
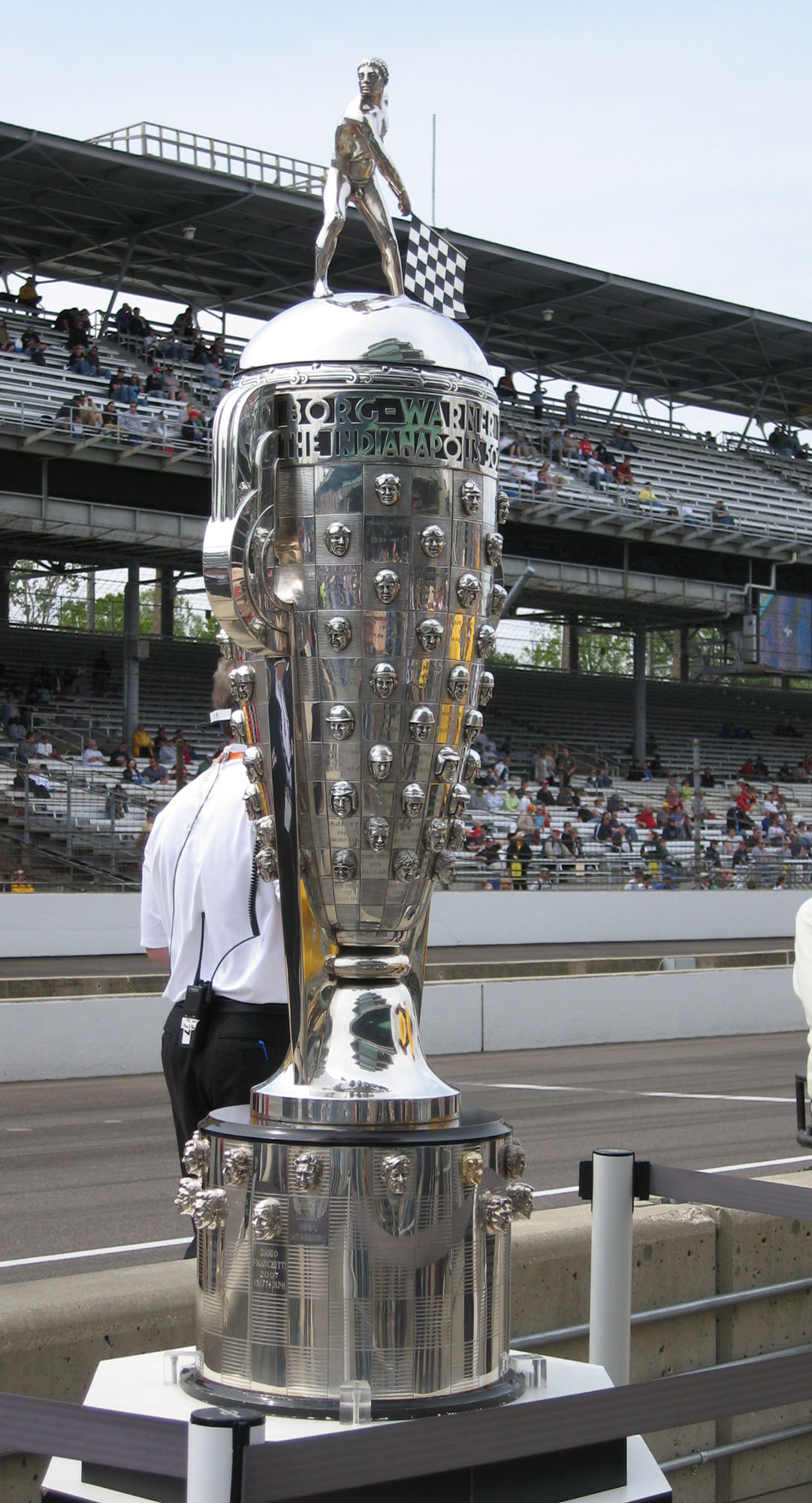
The trophy on display in the pits during qualifications

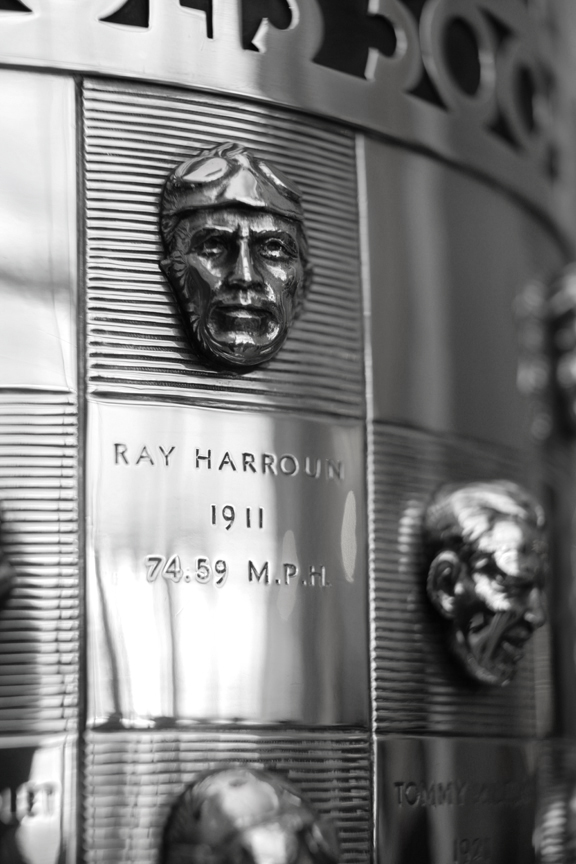
Detail
