= CAPRI model =

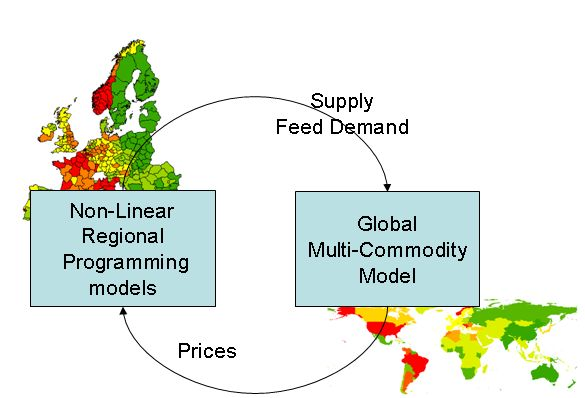
Core components of CAPRI

The CAPRI (Common Agricultural Policy Regionalised Impact) model is a tool for ex-ante impact assessment of agricultural and international trade policies with a focus on the European Union. As an economic partial comparative static equilibrium model for agriculture, its core consists of two interlinked modules: the supply module, covering about 280 regional aggregate programming models covering the EU27, Norway and Western Balkans at the NUTS 2 level and the market module, a global spatial multi-commodity model for about 50 agricultural commodities, which together allow calculation of a wide range of economic and environmental indicators. A spatial downscaling component allows impact assessment at the 1x1 km grid level for EU27. CAPRI is written in GAMS and steered by a Graphical User Interface realized in Java.

CAPRI was developed and improved in a suite of EU funded research projects (CAPRI, CAP-STRAT, CAPRI-Dynaspat). Past applications include analysis of different reform steps of the Common Agricultural Policy such as Agenda 2000, Decoupling (2003) or sugar market reform (2005-2006) and environmental impact analysis such as a trading scheme for Green House Gases from agriculture.

== Network ==
CAPRI is maintained by a network of different European research institutions and managed by teams from Institute for Food and Resource Economics at the University of Bonn, Agrifood Economics Centre at the Swedish University of Agricultural Sciences, Johann Heinrich von Thünen Institute in Braunschweig, Germany, Universidad Politécnica de Madrid, NIBIO Oslo, Norway and the Joint Research Centre of the European Commission. Its main client is the EU Commission (Directorate-Generals for Agriculture and Rural Development and for the Environment).
