= Survey of Current Business =

- Frequency: Monthly
- First issue: July 1921; 103 years ago
- Company: Bureau of Economic Analysis
- Country: United States
- Language: English
- Website: apps.bea.gov/scb/
- ISSN: 0039-6222

The Survey of Current Business (SCB) is a monthly publication by the Bureau of Economic Analysis (BEA) (a part of the United States Department of Commerce) that provides definitive information about the national economic accounts for the economy of the United States maintained by the BEA.

== History ==
The Survey of Current Business has been published monthly since July 1921, then under the auspices of the Bureau of the Census, Bureau of Foreign and Domestic Commerce, and the Bureau of Standards divisions of the United States Department of Commerce. Starting January 1994, the survey started publishing a table of contents online. Commerce Secretary Herbert Hoover expected the regular publication of official economic data to help stabilize the economy by helping businesses make investment and operational decisions. Edwin Gay and Wesley Mitchell published frequently in the SCB as they developed the national economic accounts of the U.S.

Starting February 2014, print publication of the Survey was ceased on account of low demand for the print publication as well as budgetary constraints.

Past issues are available online at the BEA web site. Archives of past issues are also available from other sources.

== Content ==
Each issue of the Survey of Current Business includes a list of regularly reported national data, industry data, international data, and regional data. In addition, each issue contains articles about topical issues such as recent government budgets or laws or other national and international developments.

Data and charts related to the survey can be accessed online using the BEA's iTable feature. Data and charts are linked to from the SCB's main page and archive pages.

== Reception ==
The Survey of Current Business is widely used by macroeconomists and financial analysts to understand the state of the US economy. The numbers reported in the SCB are often treated as standard values for reference purposes and are used to judge the accuracy of forecasts or other estimates. For instance, the Livingston Survey relies on the SCB for its quarterly variables of real non-residential fixed investment and corporate profit after taxes.

== See also ==
- Economic reports
- Survey of Consumer Finances
- Panel Study of Income Dynamics
- Philadelphia Fed Report
- Ifo Business Climate Index
- Federal Reserve Economic Data
