= Philadelphia Fed Report =

Monthly survey

The Philadelphia Fed Report, formally known as the Business Outlook Survey and sometimes abbreviated as BOS, is a monthly survey produced by the Federal Reserve Bank of Philadelphia (informally known as the Philadelphia Fed) which questions manufacturers on general business conditions. The index covers the Third Federal Reserve District (the jurisdiction of the Philadelphia Fed), namely covers eastern and central Pennsylvania, the nine southern counties of New Jersey, and Delaware. The report is sometimes also called the Philadelphia Fed Index because it includes reporting of some index values.

== History ==
The Philadelphia Fed Report has been published monthly since May 1968, and archives for all historical data (revised to account for seasonal adjustments) are available on the website.

== Details and data reported ==
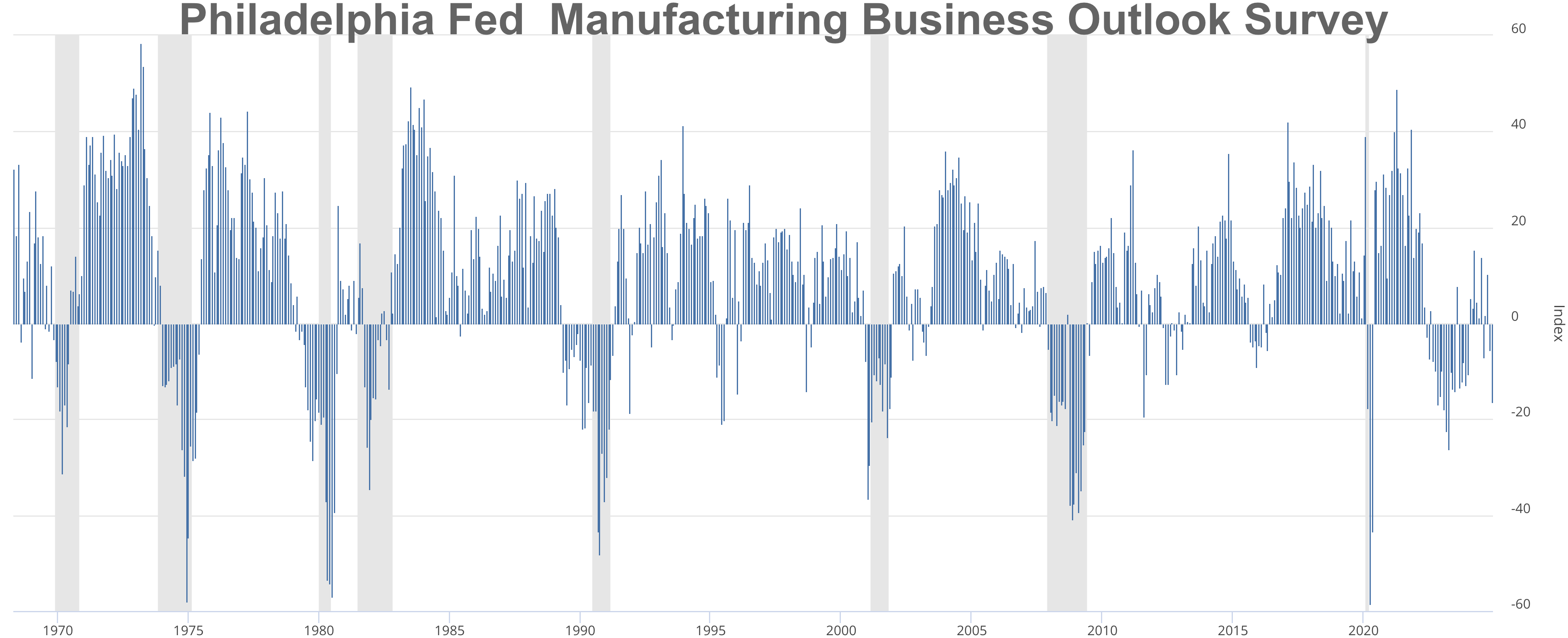
Philadelphia Fed Manufacturing Business Outlook Survey

=== Release schedule ===
The Philadelphia Index is conducted monthly by the Federal Reserve Bank of Philadelphia and questions voluntary participants on things such as unemployment, new orders, shipments, inventories, and prices paid. The report is released on the third Thursday of every month, making it the earliest such regional report which is released to investors. For instance, the report for April 2014 was released on Thursday, April 17, 2014.

=== Survey questions ===
The survey is a one-page survey asking respondents to include their name, title, company name, and mailing address, and then seeking their opinion on how they think various indicators related to business changed over the past month, as well as how they anticipate it changing over the next 6 months. For each question, they may select between the options of decrease, no change, and increase. The questions include:

- General Business Conditions: What is your evaluation of the level of general business activity?
- Company Business Indicators:
  - New orders
  - Shipments
  - Unfilled orders
  - Delivery times
  - Inventories
  - Prices paid
  - Prices received
  - Number of employees
  - Average employee workweek
  - Capital expenditures

The percentage of respondents selecting particular responses can be accessed, and charted over time to compare responses in different months.

Higher survey figures suggest higher production, which contribute to economic growth. Results are calculated as the difference between percentage scores with zero acting as the centerline point. As such, values greater than zero indicate growth, while values less than zero indicate contraction.

Some months have additional special questions included in the survey. For instance, the month of April 2014 asked the following questions:

1. How important are the following factors in influencing your firm’s decision to remain in the three-state region?
2. Have the same factors become more or less important in recent years?

for the following list of factors:

- Availability of skilled labor
- Cost of labor
- Taxes/subsidies/regulation
- Cost of energy
- Proximity of customers
- Proximity to distribution channels
- Proximity to suppliers/raw materials

== Reception ==
=== Academic reception ===
The Philadelphia Fed Report has been the subject of some academic literature on economic indicators as well as the relationship between business uncertainty and economic activity.

=== Reception in the financial press and blogs ===
The indices reported in the Philadelphia Fed Report are widely cited and used in the financial press.

The monthly reports are also the subject of many articles in the financial press and blogs, such as Business Insider, Yahoo! Finance, RTTNews, and Advisor Perspectives.

== See also ==
- Economic reports
- Survey of Current Business
- OECD Main Economic Indicators
- Federal Reserve Bulletin
