= Quiet luxury =

Lifestyle of subtle wealth

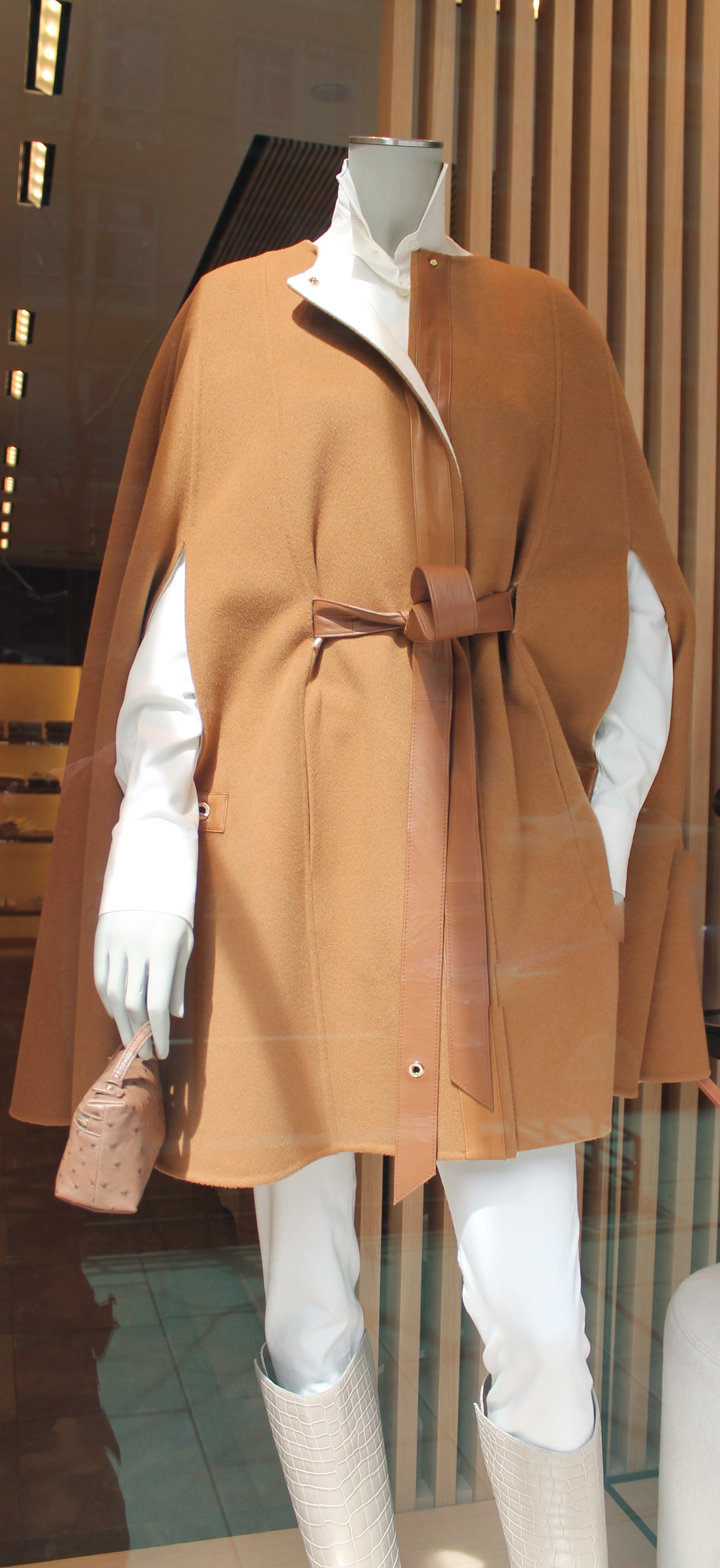
Outfit on mannequin exemplifying quiet luxury. The outfit is elegant and refined without any labels or ostentatious displays of wealth.

Quiet luxury is an aesthetic of dress and consumption characterized by understated elegance, high-quality materials and timeless styling, with no visible logos or other open markers of wealth. It is sometimes equated with "stealth wealth", "old money style", or "silent luxury", though usage may differ. Stealth wealth implies hiding money, whereas quiet luxury signals it discreetly. Quiet luxury style has been traced to the emergence of capitalist classes of Europe and America in the late 18th and early 19th centuries, who set themselves apart from courtly display through sober clothing, architecture and interiors. Streamlined, practical designs by Donna Karan and Miuccia Prada gave it a further form in the 1990s. The term became widespread in the 2020s, when conspicuous consumption lost acceptability in some affluent circles, while social media and television series like Succession brought the look to a wider audience.

== Definition ==
Quiet luxury is characterized by understated design, high-quality materials, and timeless styling, while avoiding conspicuous logos, flashy elements, or other overt markers of economic status. The aesthetic emphasizes muted colours, craftsmanship, and refined materials, expressing luxury through subtle sophistication rather than overt branding or displays of wealth.

Although the concepts of quiet luxury and stealth wealth have been equated, their usage may differ for some commentors. While stealth wealth connotes hiding wealth, quiet luxury connotes subtly signalling wealth. "Old money" is defined more narrowly. The term refers to the style of those who have inherited and kept their wealth over at least two generations. Their standing being secure from birth and rarely questioned, such consumers have a lower need for status signaling and tend to favour quiet brands.

== History ==
=== Background ===
Quiet luxury traces its roots to the rise of the capitalist class in Europe and America during the late 18th and early 19th century. As power shifted away from monarchical and ecclesiastical institutions, wealthy elites adopted understated clothing, architecture, and interiors to differentiate themselves from ostentatious, courtly styles. During this period, a related phenomenon known as the "Great Male Renunciation" saw men's fashion pivoting to somber suits and muted colors as a move away from the lace, powdered wigs, and flamboyant dress of the aristocracy.

In the Anglosphere, "stealth wealth" has aesthetics similar to those associated with the traditional Protestant privileged class, who possess inherited wealth, or "old money". For instance, in F. Scott Fitzgerald novel The Great Gatsby (1925), old-money families like Tom Buchanan's consider ostentatious displays of wealth (such as Jay Gatsby's pink suit and extravagant parties) as gauche and indicative of new money, highlighting the cultural clash between inherited privilege and newly acquired fortunes.

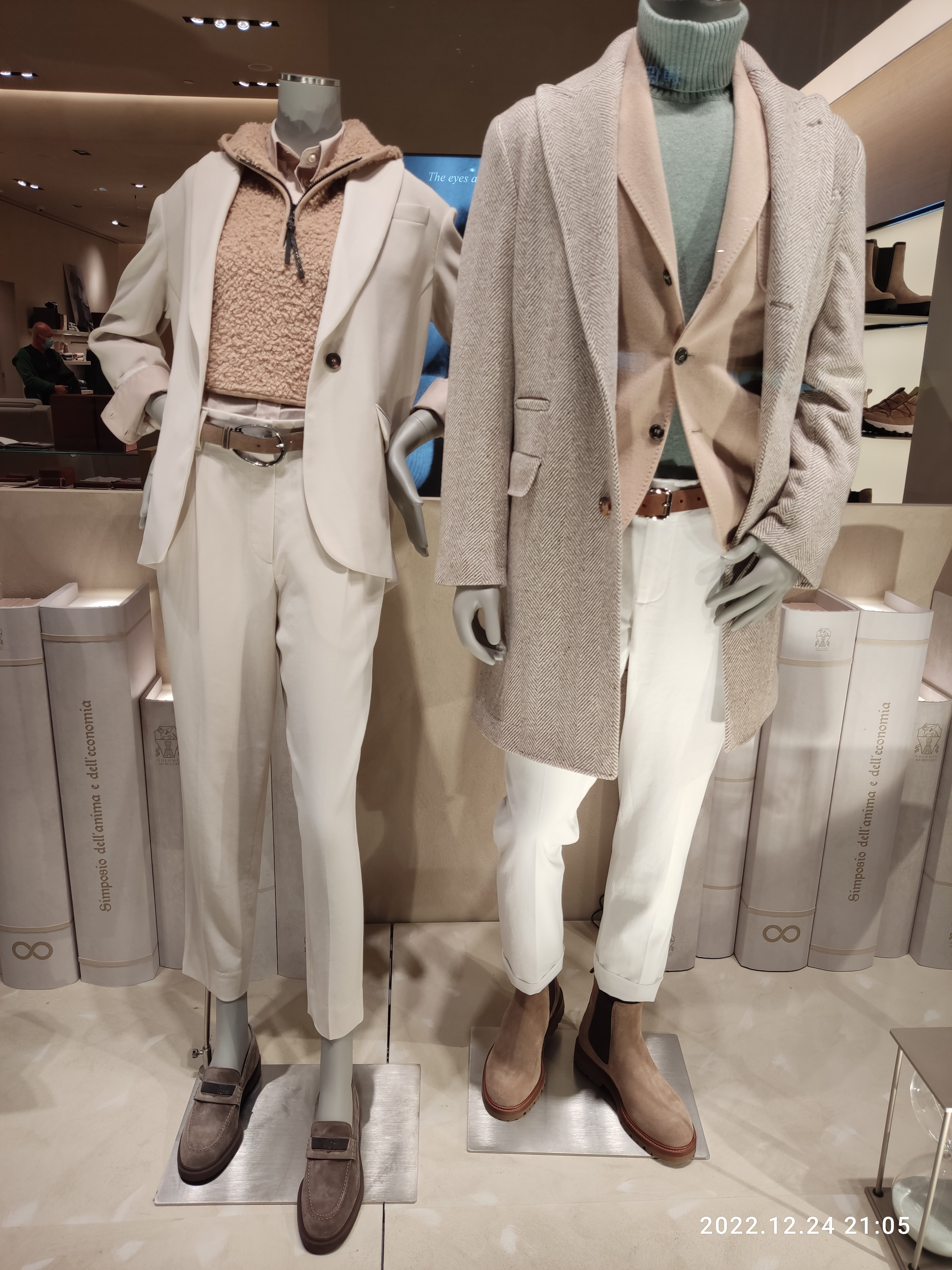
Muted color palettes of beige, white, and sage, here from Brunello Cucinelli, are characteristic of quiet luxury

In the 1990s, designers like Donna Karan and Miuccia Prada popularized practical, streamlined clothing, which mirrored broader cultural shifts toward a more casual yet status-conscious uniform, especially among affluent professionals.

=== Rise in popularity in the 2020s ===
The concept gained renewed prominence in the 2020s, when conspicuous consumption became less socially acceptable in some affluent circles. Overt displays of wealth increasingly came to be perceived as gauche and associated with unproductive status competition. In response, some ultra-wealthy consumers began signalling status through expensive yet inconspicuous domestic and personal items. The New York Times contrasted this shift with the more overt displays of wealth associated with the 1980s, when affluent elites more openly competed through lavish parties, fashion, and other forms of visible consumption.

== Social context ==
=== Social motivations ===
Several studies found that perceived social status and status anxiety predict the preference for brand prominence. Wealthy consumers with little need for status signalling tend to prefer inconspicuous luxury goods with subtle branding or no logo, while consumers with a stronger desire to signal status, regardless of their actual wealth, are more likely to prefer conspicuously branded luxury products.

Eckhardt et al. (2015) identified several factors driving the appeal of quiet luxury. These include the expansion of "masstige" luxury, where luxury goods become accessible to a broader public, prompting affluent consumers to seek subtler forms of distinction; the use of understated consumption to signal affiliation with elite groups; and the association of quiet luxury with craftsmanship, sophistication, and design quality rather than overt branding.

=== Benefits ===
Quiet luxury items generally focus more on the customer's needs and are intended to remain relevant for as long as possible. Emphasis on quality tends to make them more sustainable, encouraging thoughtful purchasing and investment in long-lasting pieces rather than following transient fashion cycles. While this approach might seem less profitable—given that consumers may purchase items less frequently—it can foster long-term brand loyalty, as customers are more likely to return to trusted labels for future purchases.

=== Social media trends ===
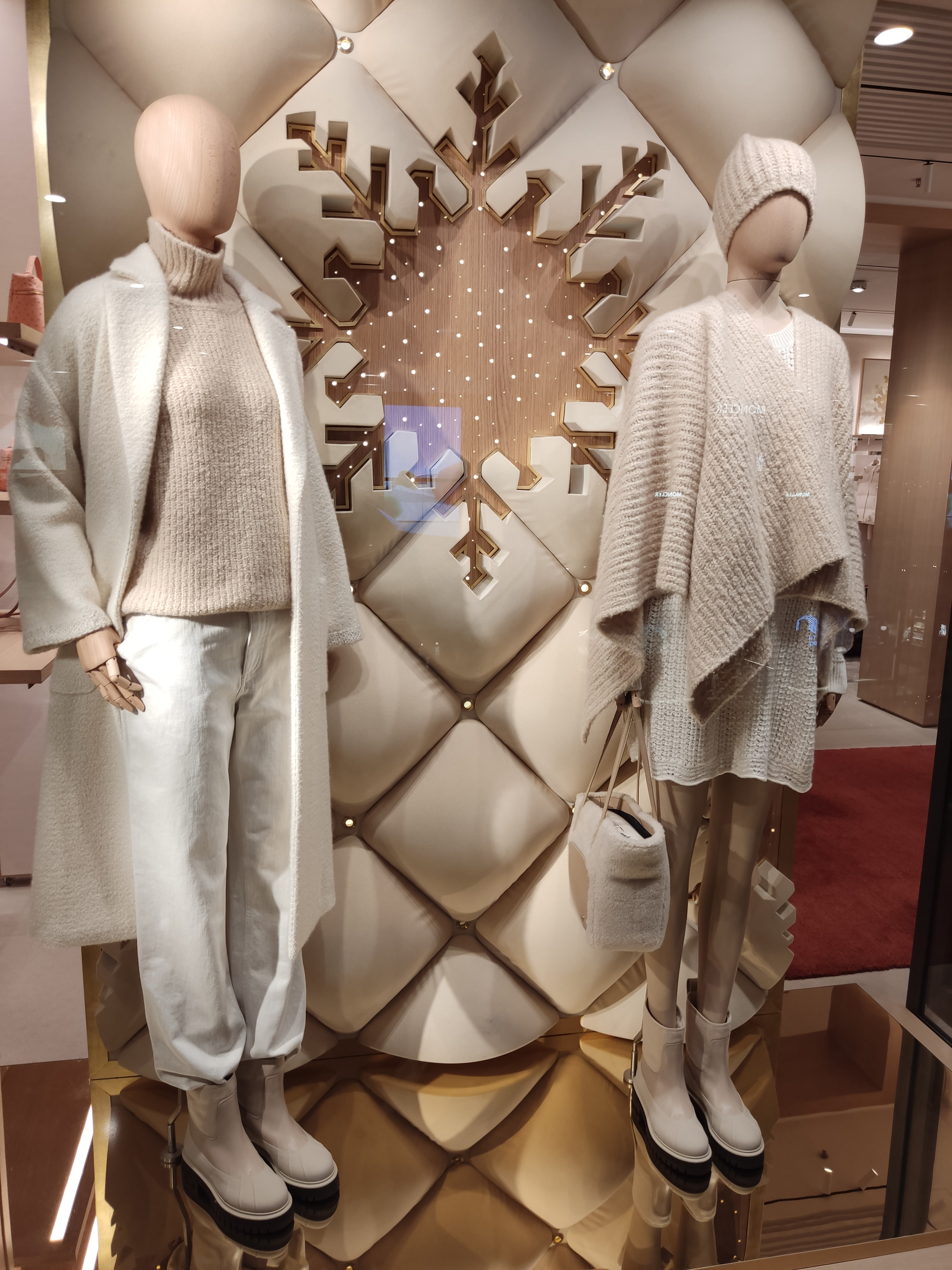
Loro Piana embodies quiet luxury

The rise of social media has led to the increased spectatorship of the lives of the wealthy, with individuals creating narratives of a lavish lifestyle for public consumption. However, quiet luxury emphasizes privacy, discouraging overt displays of wealth that might make one a target. Contemporary status symbols for the wealthy include inconspicuous designer clothing and discreet, yet expensive, jewelry.

The quiet luxury trend in 2023 likely arose for a number of reasons. One is due to the economic conditions following the COVID-19 pandemic when people spent more disposable income on services and less on expensive, trendy products. The fear of economic stagnation or recession influencing the trend led to it being dubbed "recessioncore". Also, the television series Succession portrayed some of the wealthiest New Yorkers wearing expensive, yet subtle pieces of fashion and has been attributed to fueling the trend. This led to the term Succession core. The Gwyneth Paltrow civil court case in March 2023 in Utah also contributed to the trend, as her wardrobe reflected the concept as well. By January 2024, the trend was considered outdated as the 2024 Paris Fashion Week featured styles with more flair.

== Brands ==
Brands with the quiet luxury aesthetic include Loro Piana, Brunello Cucinelli, Zegna, Hermès, Brioni, Canali, Cesare Attolini, Bottega Veneta, The Row, Valextra, and Celine under Phoebe Philo. Fashion designers Jil Sander and Giorgio Armani have also been cited as precursors to the aesthetic, particularly through their minimalist and understated designs in the 1980s and 1990s. The related concepts of stealth wealth and old money style are often associated with Savile Row tailoring and heritage luxury brands, including John Lobb, Turnbull & Asser, Anderson & Sheppard, Huntsman, and Purdey.

These brands are characterized by their focus on the quality of materials and construction, a classic style designed to be timeless and resistant to fleeting trends, the absence of prominent logos, and exclusivity through premium pricing.

== See also ==
- 2020s fashion
- Dark academia
- Dress code
- Luxury goods
- Normcore
- Preppy
- Sloane ranger
