= Lipstick effect =

Economic theory

Lipstick for sale in a shopping mall

The lipstick effect is the hypothesis that when facing an economic crisis, consumers will be more willing to buy less costly luxury goods. The concept was publicized in 2008 when Leonard Lauder said that he noted his company's sales of lipstick rose after the 2001 terrorist attacks. The lipstick index is an indicator derived from this hypothetical effect and first was used to describe increased sales of cosmetics during the early 2000s recession. Analysis and subsequent recessions have provided evidence controverting Lauder's claims, though related indices have been proposed for other cosmetics, including nail polish and mascara.

== Description ==
The lipstick effect theory contends that consumers will be more willing to buy less costly luxury goods when they are facing an economic crisis. Instead of buying expensive purses and fur coats, for example, people will buy expensive cosmetics, such as high-end brands of lipstick. The underlying assumption is that a certain portion of consumers will still buy luxury goods even during a bad economy. When consumer trust in the economy is dwindling, consumers will buy goods that have less impact on their available funds. Outside the cosmetics market, consumers might be tempted to purchase other high-end goods such as expensive beers, or smaller, less costly electronic gadgets.

== History ==
Juliet Shor in her book The Overspent American talks to consumers' purchase of higher-priced, more prestigious lipsticks—specifically Chanel—that are used in public compared to lower-priced, less prestigious brands that are used in the privacy of the bathroom. Leonard Lauder, chairman of Estée Lauder, believed that higher lipstick sales indicated unwillingness to buy dresses. Lauder said that after the 2001 terrorist attacks, a "Leading Lipstick Index" of lipstick sales across all Estée Lauder brands went up. Across the country, lipstick sales were up 11% in the last quarter of 2001, echoing the 25% increase in cosmetic sales during the Great Depression. Lauder made the claim that lipstick sales could be an economic indicator, in that purchases of cosmetics—lipstick in particular—tend to be inversely correlated to economic health.

=== Testing ===
Subsequent recessions, including the late-2000s recession, provided controverting evidence to Lauder's claims, as sales fell with reduced economic activity in that recession. Conversely, lipstick sales have experienced growth during periods of increased economic activity. Usefulness of the lipstick index as an economic indicator is low. The increased sales of cosmetics in 2001 has since been attributed to increased interest in celebrity-designed cosmetics brands.

== Legacy ==
In the 2010s, many media outlets reported that with the rise of nail art as fad in English-speaking countries and as far afield as Japan and the Philippines, nail polish had replaced lipstick as the main affordable indulgence for women in place of bags and shoes during recession, leading to talk of a nail polish index.

During the coronavirus pandemic, the mandated use of face masks to prevent the spread of the disease resulted in an increase of eye makeup purchases, suggesting a mascara index. Relatively low-cost items such as coffee and artisanal bread were also cited in a BBC News report as contemporary examples of the lipstick effect, with consumers shifting towards such purchases during periods of economic uncertainty. The report also noted that this spending pattern has also been associated with impulse purchasing and in some cases, increased credit card debt. In the 2020s, the smellmaxxing trend led to Gen Z purchasing high-end fragrances that could cost hundreds of dollars.

== See also ==
- Men's underwear index
- Big Mac index
- Hemline index
