= Bureau of Foreign and Domestic Commerce =

The Bureau of Foreign and Domestic Commerce (BFDC) was a bureau in the United States Department of Commerce and Labor from 1912-1953 that conducted statistical analysis, promoted trade and industry.

== Organizational History ==
The BFDC was established as the consolidation of the earlier Bureau of Statistics and the Bureau of Manufacturing in the 1912.

In 1945 the BFDC was re-organized to have five autonomous units:

- Office of International Trade: Functions transferred to the newly established Bureau of Foreign Commerce (BFC) in 1953, that in 1961 was split into the Bureau of International Programs and Bureau of International Business Operations, which were then consolidated into the Bureau of International Commerce (BIC) in 1963.
- Offices of Small Businesses, Domestic Commerce and Field Operations: Functions of all three were transferred to the newly created Business and Defense Services Administration in 1953 and later to the Bureau of Domestic Commerce (BDC) in 1970.
- Office of Business Economics: In 1953 designated as a primary Department of Commerce organization (some functions transferred to BDSA and Bureau of Foreign Commerce). The office was renamed in 1972 to the Bureau of Economic Analysis.

The BDC was consolidated with the BIC to form the Domestic and International Business Administration in 1972, which in 1977 became the Industry and Trade Administration in 1977. It was succeeded in 1980 by the International Trade Administration.
