= Hemline index =

Economic theory

The hemline index is a theory that suggests that skirt length (hemlines) rise or fall along with stock prices. The most common version of the theory is that skirt lengths get shorter in good economic times (1920s, 1960s) and longer in bad, such as after the 1929 Wall Street crash. However, the reverse has also been proposed with longer skirts signaling prosperity (1950s).

The theory is often incorrectly attributed to economist George Taylor in 1926. Taylor's 1929 thesis Significant post-war changes in the full-fashioned hosiery industry, which identified skirt length as one factor that led to explosive growth in the hosiery industry during the 1920s, did not propose a hemline theory.

Non-peer-reviewed research in 2010 supported the correlation, suggesting that "the economic cycle leads the hemline with about three years".

Desmond Morris revisited the theory in his book Manwatching.

== See also ==
- Men's underwear index
- Big Mac Index
- Lipstick Index
