= Robert J. Hill =

Robert J. Hill (died May 29, 1953), nicknamed Bobil, was a draftsman, designer and the art director of the bronze division of Gorham, Inc. in Rhode Island. He designed in 1926 the General Custer Trophy, and in 1935 the Borg-Warner Trophy. He retired in 1948.
