= Cost-weighted activity index =

A cost-weighted activity index is a technique for measuring the changes in the output of an organisation over time. It is used particularly for Government departments and other bodies that do not operate in a market, hence normal means of measuring output cannot be used.

== Rationale and use ==
Following work by Michael Baxter and Alwyn Pritchard, the technique is being used increasingly by the Office for National Statistics in the United Kingdom, the Australian Bureau of Statistics and many other statistical offices, in preference to the traditional method of equating output to input (i.e. number of staff employed plus volume of input). The traditional method is much easier to use, but has the disadvantage that it cannot measure changes in efficiency.

The procedure is as follows: the activities of the organisation are divided into homogeneous categories. The cost of each category and the level of activity in the base year are determined. The level of activity is then measured in a subsequent year, and the percentage changes are weighted together by the costs in the base year to get an overall percentage change in output. The mathematics of the calculation are identical to those for calculating any index number, such as a price index.

== Example of use ==
Consider a prison, which in 2000 housed 20 low-risk, 30 medium-risk and 10 high-risk prisoners, or 60 prisoners in total. The three categories are considered homogeneous, in that the output of housing one low-risk prisoner is the same as housing another. The total costs in 2000 are £20,000 for low-risk, £45,000 for medium-risk and £25,000 for high-risk prisoners, or £90,000 in total.

In 2005, there are 22, 27 and 15 prisoners in these categories, so the changes are +10%, -10% and +50%. There are 64 prisoners in total, an increase of about 6.7%. The weighted percentage change is

(20,000x10% + 45,000x(-10%) + 25,000*50%)/90,000 = 11.1%.

This is greater than the increase in the number of prisoners, because the proportion of expensive high-risk prisoners has risen.

This is a Laspeyres index, because it is base-weighted. It would be possible to use a Paasche index or a Fisher index, but this is not customary.
