= Housing starts =

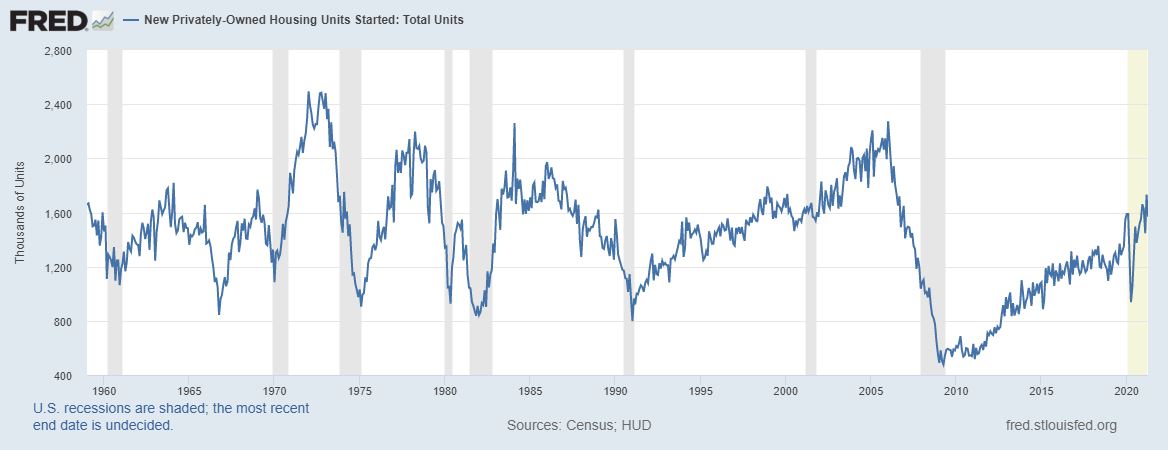
Housing starts in the United States, 1959–2021

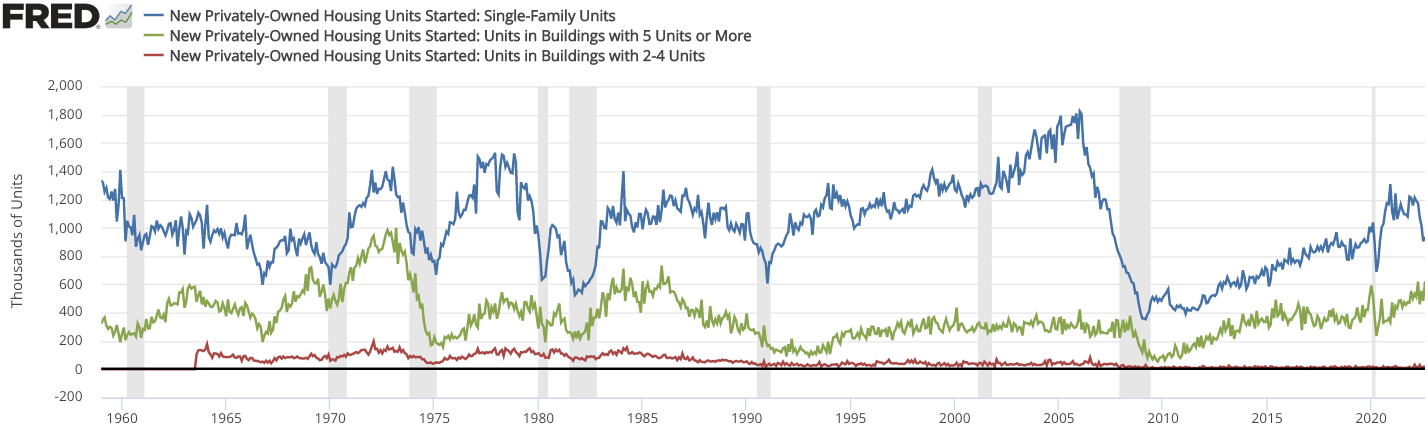
Housing starts in the United States, 1959–2021 Single family home Multifamily residential 2-4 unit residential

Housing starts is an economic indicator that reflects the number of privately owned new houses (technically housing units) on which construction has been started in a given period. This data is divided into three types: single-family houses, townhouses or small condos, and apartment buildings with five or more units.

Each apartment unit is considered a single start. The construction of a 30-unit apartment building is counted as 30 housing starts.
