= Bureau of Economic Analysis =

US federal government agency

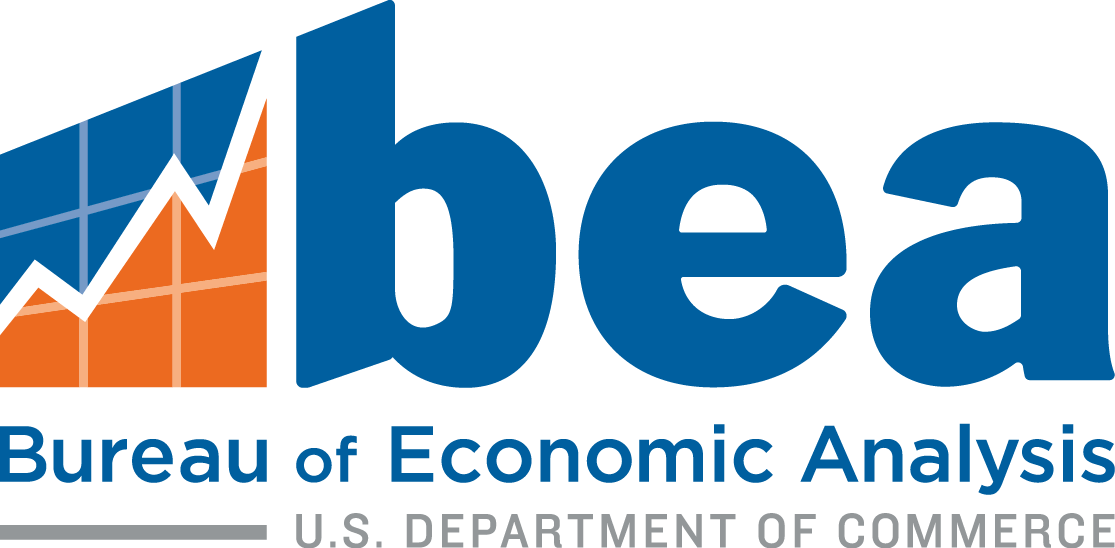
- Logo of the Bureau of Economic Analysis

Agency overview
- Formed: January 1, 1972; 54 years ago
- Preceding agency: Office of Business Economics
- Headquarters: Suitland, Maryland, U.S.
- Employees: 500
- Annual budget: $101 million (FY2019)
- Agency executives: Vipin Arora, Director; Patricia Abaroa, Deputy Director;
- Parent department: Department of Commerce
- Website: www.bea.gov

The Bureau of Economic Analysis (BEA) of the United States Department of Commerce is a U.S. government agency that provides official macroeconomic and industry statistics, most notably reports about the gross domestic product (GDP) of the United States and its jurisdictions. They also provide information about personal income, corporate profits, and government spending in their National Income and Product Accounts (NIPAs).

The BEA is one of the principal agencies of the U.S. federal statistical system. Its stated mission is to "promote a better understanding of the U.S. economy by providing the most timely, relevant, and accurate economic data in an objective and cost-effective manner".

BEA has about 500 employees and an annual budget of approximately $101 million.

== National accounts ==
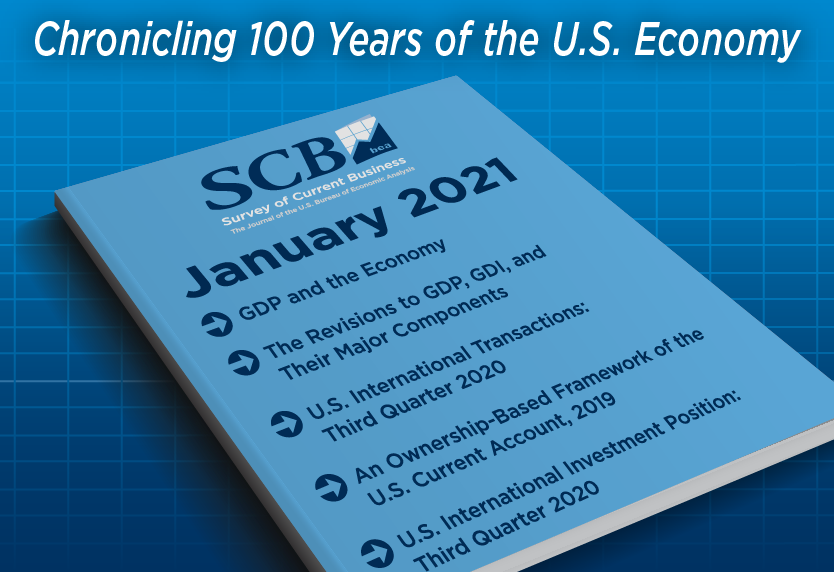
The BEA regularly publishes reports, including monthly analysis titled the Survey of Current Business.

BEA's national economic statistics (National Economic Accounts) provide a comprehensive view of U.S. production, consumption, investment, exports and imports, and income and saving. These statistics are best known by summary measures such as gross domestic product (GDP), corporate profits, personal income and spending, and personal saving.

The National Income and Product Accounts (NIPAs) provide information about personal income, corporate profits, government spending, fixed assets, and changes in the net worth of the U.S. economy.

The accounts also include other approaches and methods of measuring income and spending, such as the gross domestic income (GDI) and gross national income (GNI).

== Industry accounts ==
The industry economic accounts, presented both in an input-output framework and as annual output by each industry, provide a detailed view of the interrelationships between U.S. producers and users and the contribution to production across industries. These accounts are used extensively by policymakers and businesses to understand industry interactions, productivity trends, and the changing structure of the U.S. economy.

There are quarterly and annual reports for "GDP by Industry Accounts", designed for analysis of a specific industry's contribution to overall economic growth and inflation.

== Regional Economic Accounts ==
The regional economic accounts provide information about the geographic distribution of U.S. economic activity and growth. The estimates of gross domestic product (GDP) by state and state and local area personal income (PI), and the accompanying detail, provide a consistent framework for analyzing and comparing individual state and local area economies.

=== Uses of the regional program estimates ===
- The Federal government uses regional income and product estimates to distribute funds to states:
  - BEA Regional Income and Product Account Estimates Used to Distribute $406.8 Billion in Federal Funds
  - FY2016 Federal Funds Distribution Using BEA Regional Income and Product Account Statistics
  - Federal Uses of BEA Regional Statistics, FY2016
- Twenty-six states have set constitutional or statutory limits on state government revenues or spending that are tied to BEA state personal income or one of its components
- The National Oceanic and Atmospheric Administration (NOAA) produces statistics for coastal areas, utilizing BEA regional statistics.
- Academic researchers use the estimates for applied economic research.
- Businesses, trade associations, and labor organizations use the estimates for market research.

=== Regional Program ===
The regional program maintains a partnership with a group of users, its members including State agencies, universities, and Census Primary State Data Centers. Users disseminate regional data and give feedback on our estimates and the presentation of the estimates. Distribution in this way encourages State universities and State agencies to use data that are comparable for all States and counties and consistent with national totals, thus enhancing the uniformity of analytic approaches taken in economic development programs and improving the recipients' ability to assess local area economic developments and to service their local clientele.

== International accounts ==
The international transactions accounts provide information on trade in goods and services (including the balance of payments and the balance of trade), investment income, and government and private financial flows. In addition, the accounts measure the value of U.S. international assets and liabilities and direct investment by multinational enterprises. BEA's data on direct investment— the most detailed data set on the activities of multinational enterprises (MNEs) available—are used to assess the role these business enterprises play in the global economy.

== History ==
The history of the BEA traces back to two organizations:

- The Division of Commerce and Navigation founded in 1820 in the Office of the Registrar in the Department of the Treasury. This division was abolished in 1866 and functions transferred to a newly created Bureau of Statistics.
- The Statistical Office founded in 1856 in the Department of State. The Office was redesignated the Bureau of Statistics in 1874 and redesignated the Bureau of Foreign Commerce in 1897.

The Bureau of Statistics in Treasury and the Bureau of Foreign Commerce in State were consolidated into the Bureau of Statistics in the new established Department of Commerce and Labor in 1903. The Bureau of Statistics was merged with the Bureau of Manufacturing in 1912 to become the Bureau of Foreign and Domestic Commerce (BFDC). When the department was split, the BFDC was transferred to the newly established Department of Commerce. The Office of Business Economics (OBE) was established in BFDC in 1945. In 1953, the BFDC was abolished and the OBE was designated a primary organization of the department. In 1972, the OBE was redesignated the Bureau of Economic Analysis and assigned to the newly established Social and Economic Statistics Administration (SESA) in the department. The BEA was granted autonomous bureau status in 1975 when the SESA was abolished.

== See also ==
- Title 15 of the Code of Federal Regulations
- Bureau of the Census
- Bureau of Labor Statistics
- Consumer Leverage Ratio
- Bureau of Economic Analysis regions
- Survey of Current Business, the monthly publication of the BEA that includes their official statistics
