= Jōruri-ji (Matsuyama) =

- 浄瑠璃寺
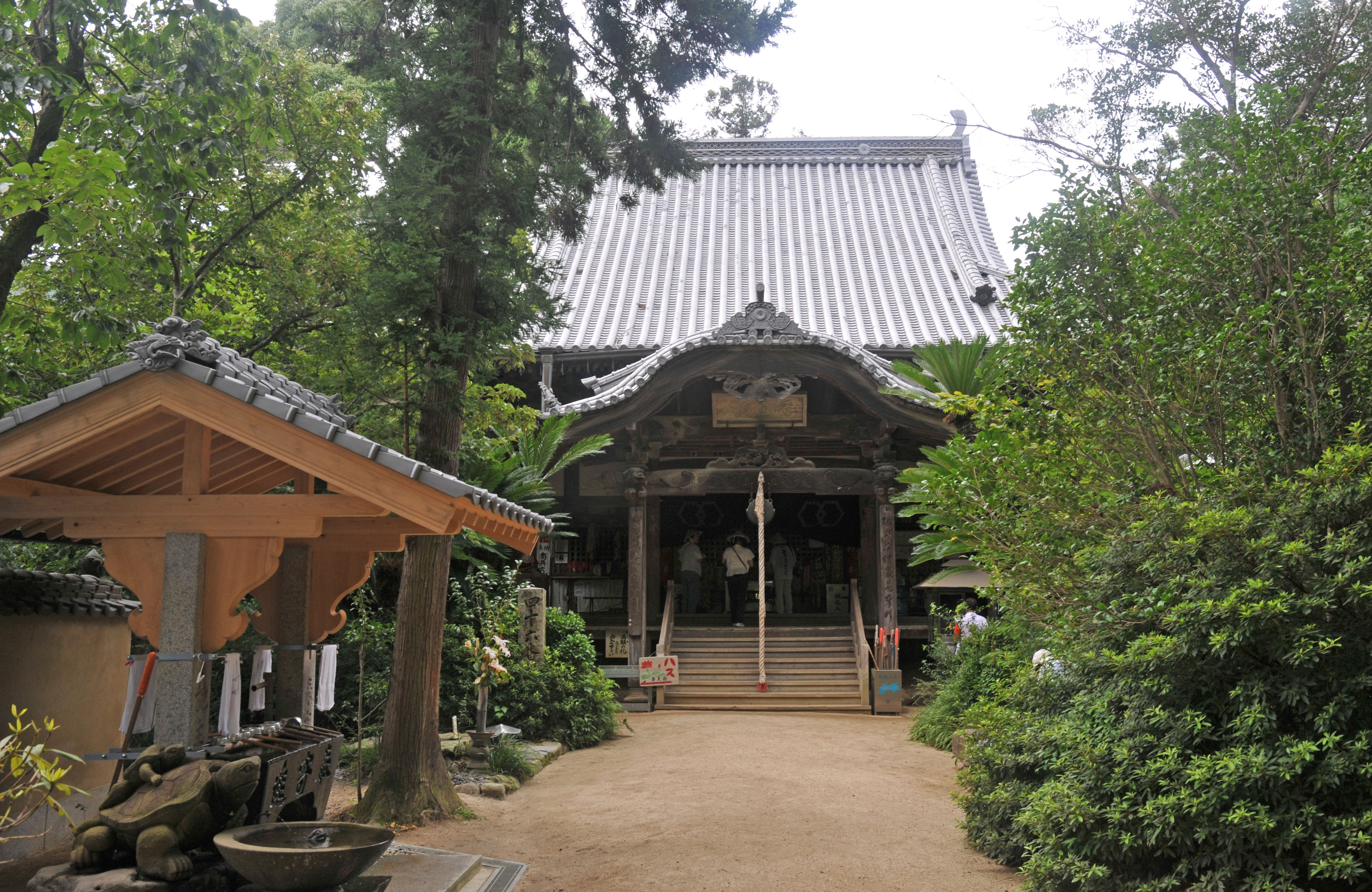

Religion
- Affiliation: Buddhism other_info =: Sect: [[{{{sect}}}]]

Location
- Country: Japan
- Interactive map of Jōruri-ji

Jōruri-ji (Japanese: 浄瑠璃寺) is a temple belonging to the Buzan branch of the Shingon school of Buddhism, located in Jōruri-chō, Matsuyama City, Ehime Prefecture. Its formal mountain name is Iōzan, and its institutional name is Yōju-in. Its principal deity is Yakushi Nyorai (the Medicine Buddha). It serves as the 46th temple on the Shikoku 88 temple pilgrimage. The temple grounds are adorned with a vibrant array of seasonal blossoms, including Taiwan cherry blossoms, lotuses, peonies, hydrangeas, and acanthus flowers.

- Mantra of the Principal Deity: Om korokoro sendari matōgi sowaka
- Pilgrim's Hymn: When I contemplate the Pure Land of Jōruri, I realize that the joys and sorrows I experience are but the karmic rewards of my deeds.

== History ==
According to temple tradition, the temple was founded in the first year of the Wado era (708)—prior to the Eye-Opening Ceremony of the Great Buddha—when the monk Gyoki visited the area to preach. He is said to have constructed the temple buildings, carved and enshrined the principal deity Yakushi Nyorai (the Medicine Buddha), along with his attendant bodhisattvas Nikko and Gekko, and the Twelve Heavenly Generals. Later, in the second year of the Daido era (807), it is said that Kukai (Kobo Daishi) restored the temple.

During the late Muromachi period, Hiraoka Michiyori—a military commander of the Ashikaga Shogunate and a devout adherent of the temple—renovated and improved the temple complex. The temple was destroyed in a forest fire in the fifth year of the Shotoku era (1715) but was subsequently reconstructed in the fifth year of the Tenmei era (1785)—during the mid-Edo period—through the dedicated efforts of the head priest, Gyoon.

== Temple Grounds ==
- Main Hall (Hondo): Visitors may view the Twelve Heavenly Generals (Juni Shinsho) enshrined in the side aisles, as well as the standing statues of the Nikko (Sunlight) and Gekko (Moonlight) Bodhisattvas serving as flanking deities.
- Daishi Hall: Visitors may view a statue of the Great Master (Kobo Daishi) clad in robes. Located to the front-left, a statue depicting the Great Master as an infant (the "Birth Buddha") is available for visitors to hold.
- Ichigan Benzaiten Hall: The Hall of Benzaiten (Sarasvati), dedicated to the fulfillment of a single wish.

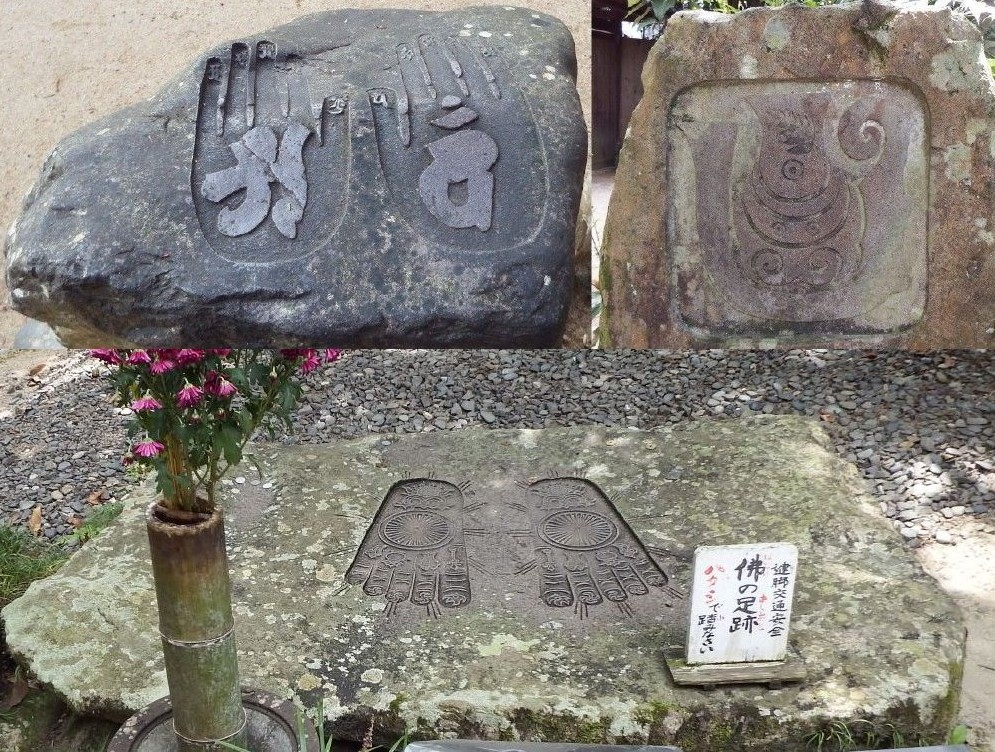
Handprint Stone, Fingerprint Stone, Buddha Footprint Stone

- Buddha Hand Stone, Buddha Hand Kahan (Fingerprint Stone), and Buddha Footprint Stone: Created to commemorate the 1,200th anniversary of the birth of Kobo Daishi.
- Momi Daishi: A statue of the Great Master associated with rice husks (momi).
- Seppo-seki (Sermon Stone): A stone said to have been used by the Great Master when delivering sermons.
- Banrei-to (Tower of Ten Thousand Souls): A memorial tower dedicated to all spirits.
- Ibuki-byakushin (Ibuki Juniper): A natural monument designated by Matsuyama City, said to be over 1,000 years old.
- Haiku Monument: A stone monument inscribed with the haiku by Masaoka Shiki—"Long is the day; Emon Saburo at Jōruri-ji"—stands to the left of the stone steps at the temple entrance.
- Shoro (Bell Tower): Houses the "Bell of Yakushi's Twelve Vows."

Ascending the stone steps from the prefectural road leads visitors into the temple grounds, which are enveloped by trees; the Bell Tower and Buddha Hand Stone are located to the right, while the *Nokyo-jo (Sutra-offering Office) is to the left. Continuing further, the Temizu-ya (Purification Pavilion), Buddha Footprint Stone, and Buddha Hand Kahan are found on the left, while the Ibuki Juniper, Momi Daishi, and Sermon Stone are on the right. The Main Hall stands directly ahead, with the Daishi Hall situated to its right. The Ichigan Benzaiten Hall is located to the left of the Main Hall; adjacent to its south lies Benten Pond, which serves as a lotus garden where the flowers bloom around the end of the rainy season. Following the path leading west from the Ichigan Benzaiten Hall brings visitors to a Peony Garden, where hundreds of peony bushes burst into bloom from mid-to-late April. Additionally, for a brief period in mid-June, Acanthus flowers bloom on the northern side of the temple grounds.

- Shukubo (Temple Lodging): None available.
- Parking: Capacity for 15 vehicles. Free of charge.
- Benten Pond Lotus Garden: Located adjacent to the southern edge of the temple grounds; features blooming ancient lotus varieties.
- Peony Garden: Located adjacent to the west side of the temple grounds, where peonies bloom around the Ruri Kannon statue.
- Longleaf Pine: Bears massive pine cones, and in May, spring cicadas can be heard singing.
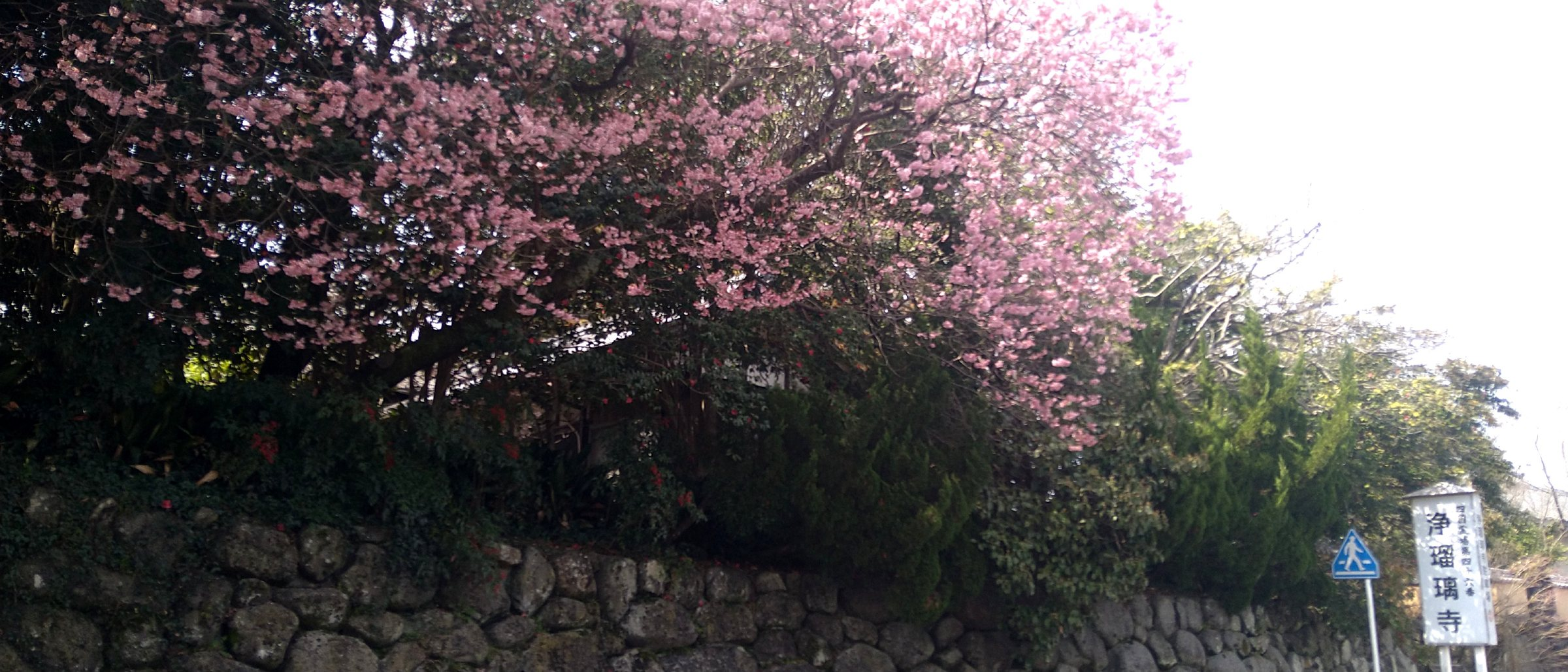
Taiwan Cherry blossoms near the Sanmon Gate. Because they bloom around the time of the Nirvana Ceremony, they are commonly known as the "Nirvana Cherries."

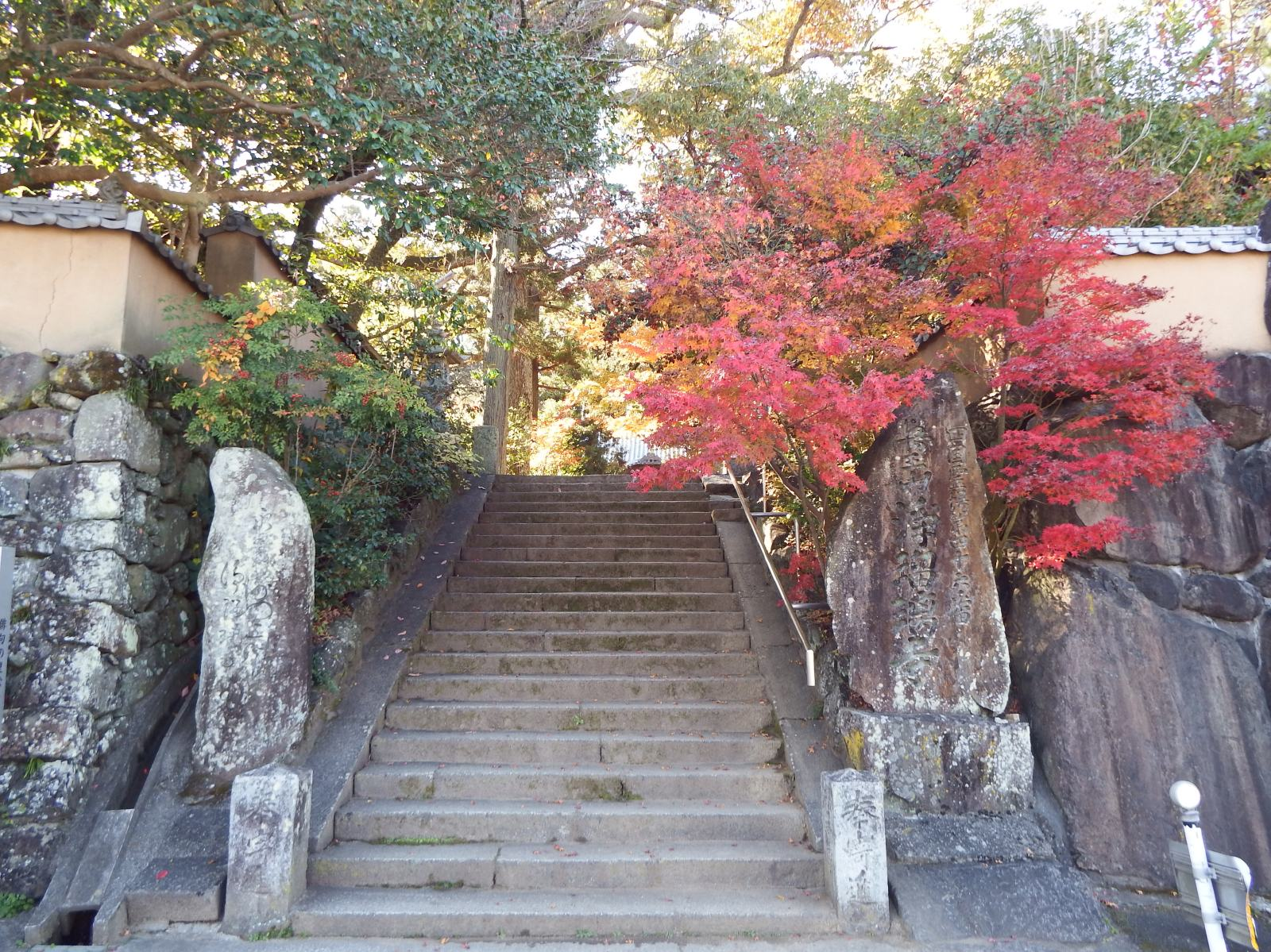
A haiku monument dedicated to Masaoka Shiki, located to the left of the entrance steps.

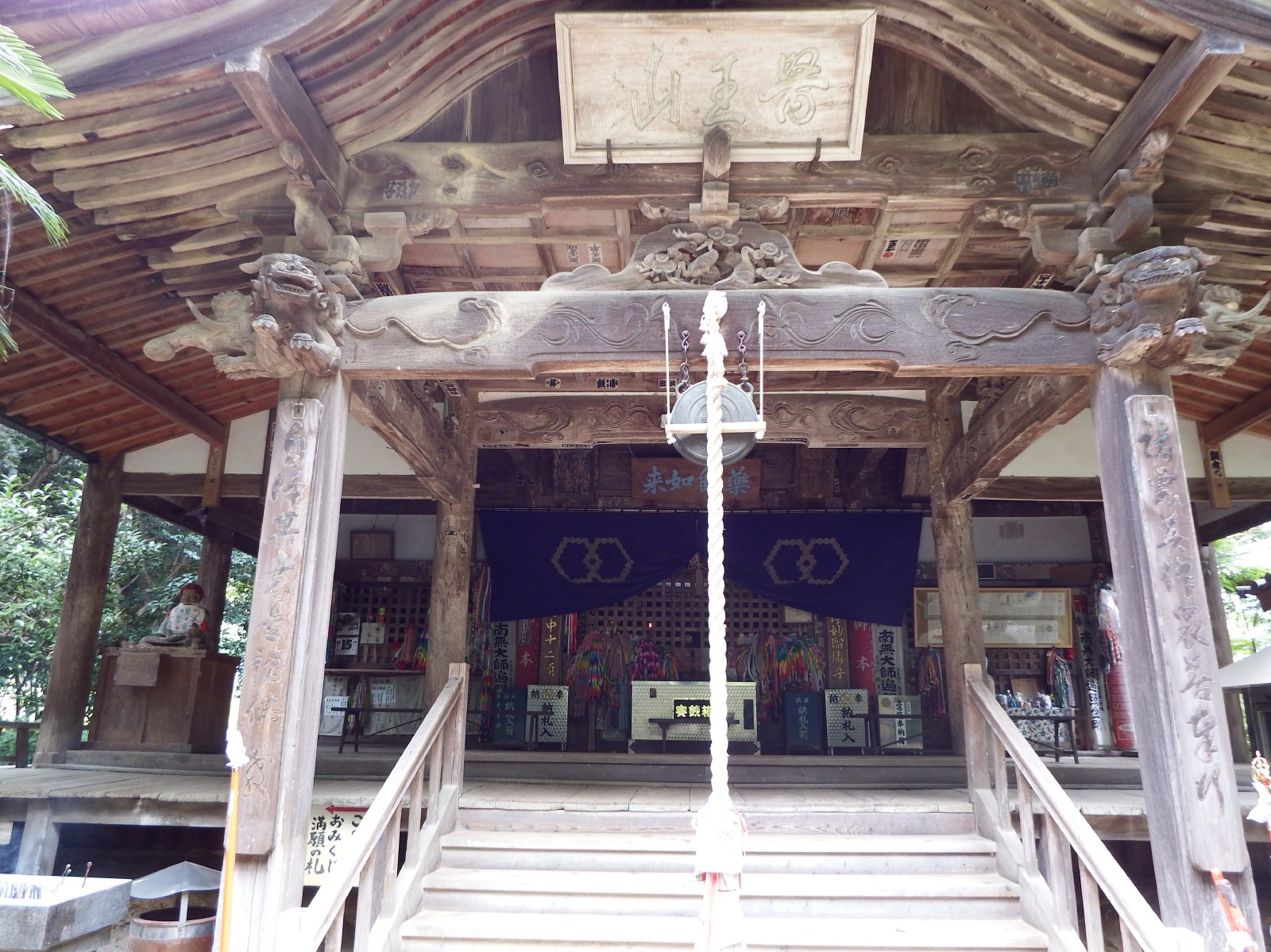
The Main Hall.

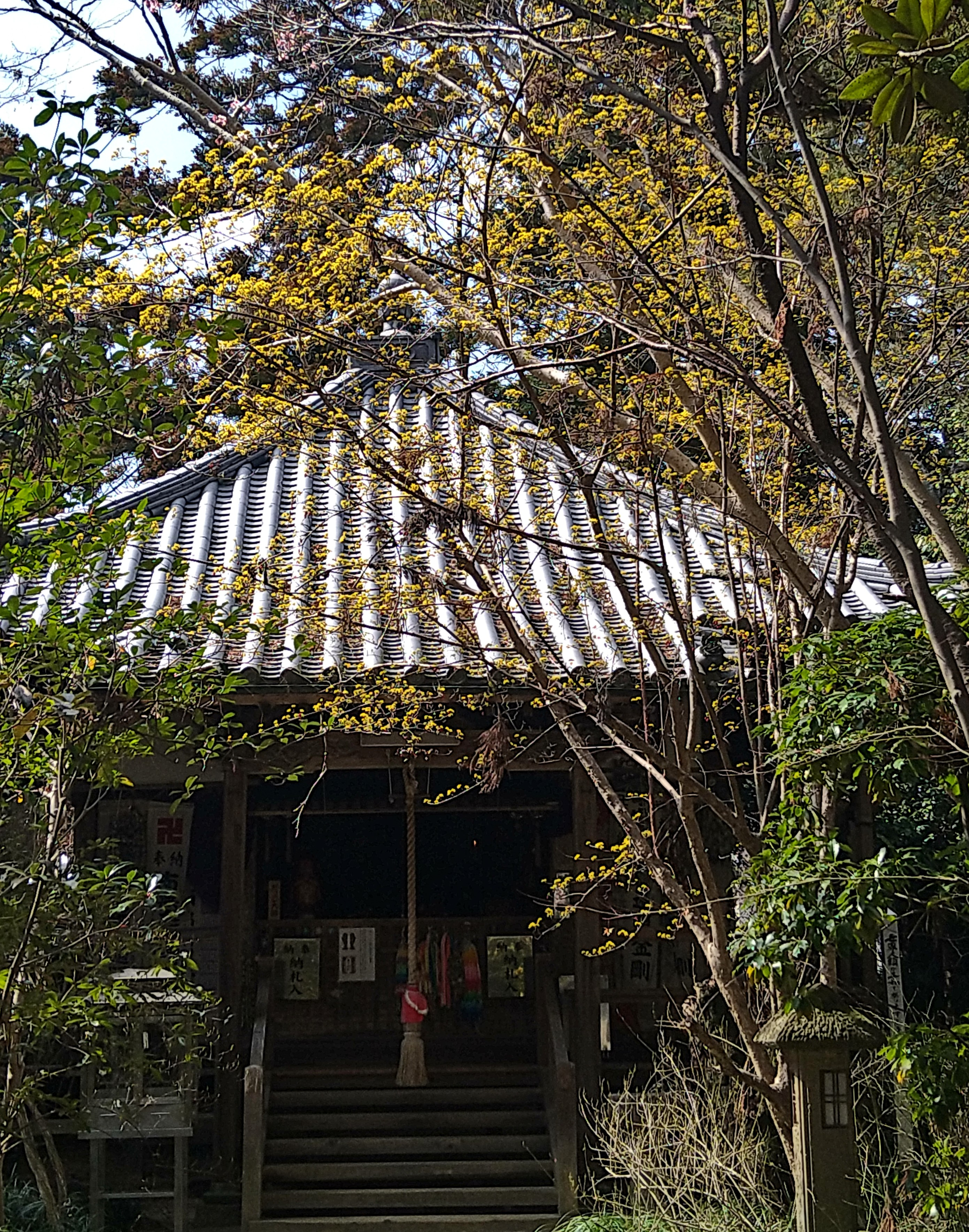
Cornelian Cherry (Sanshuyu) in front of the Daishido Hall.

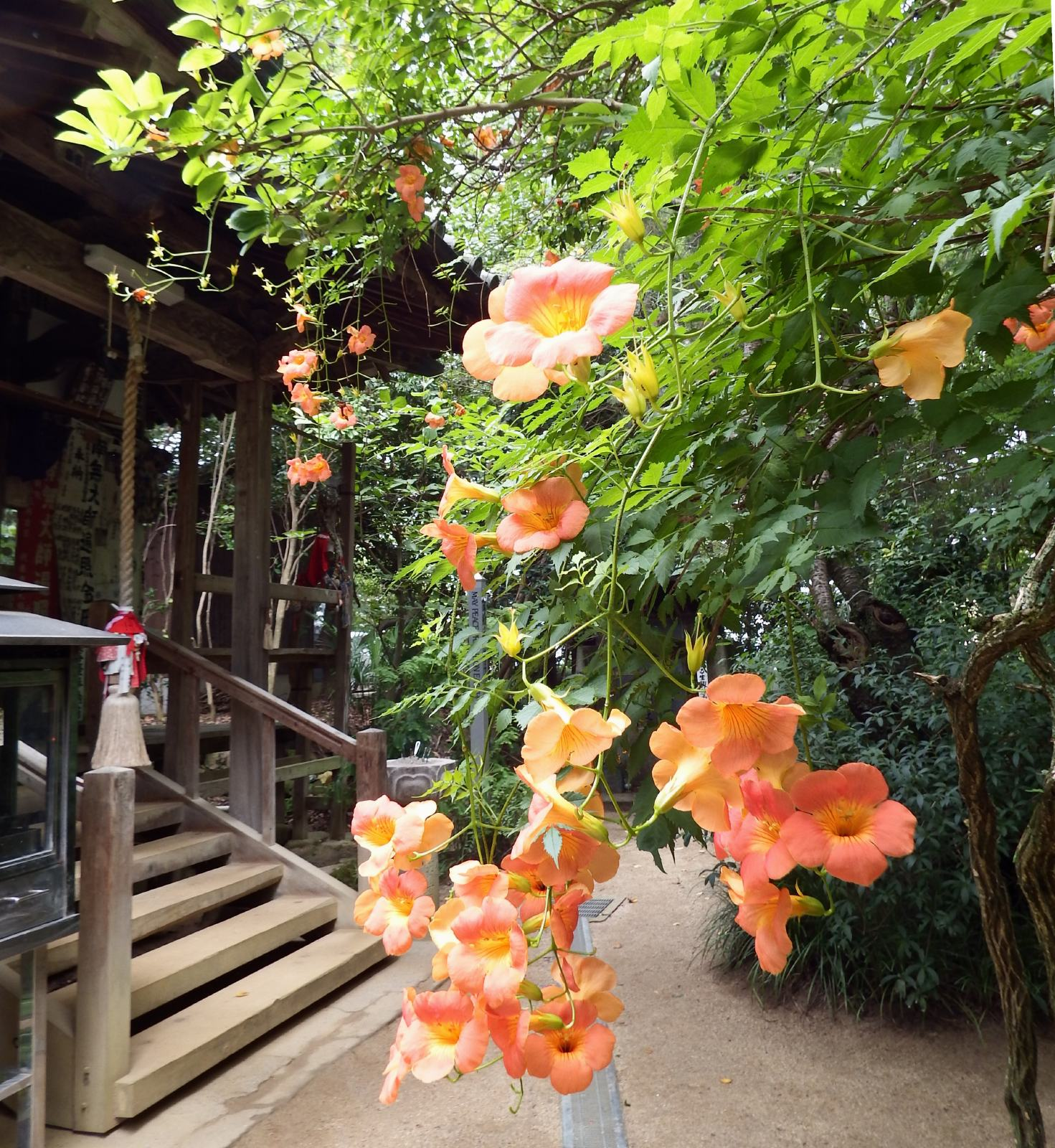
Chinese Trumpet Vine in front of the Daishido Hall.

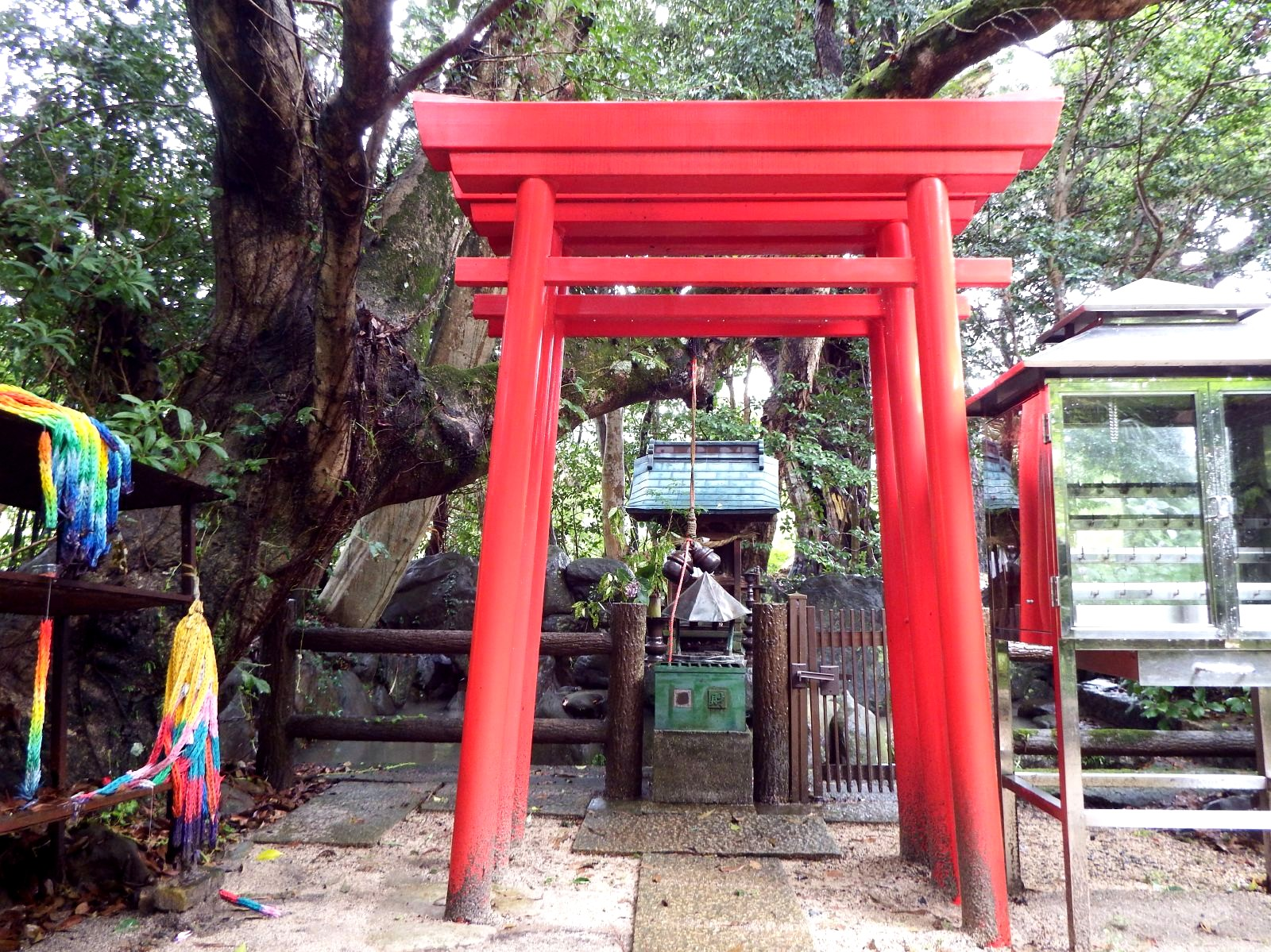
The Ichigan Benzaiten Hall.

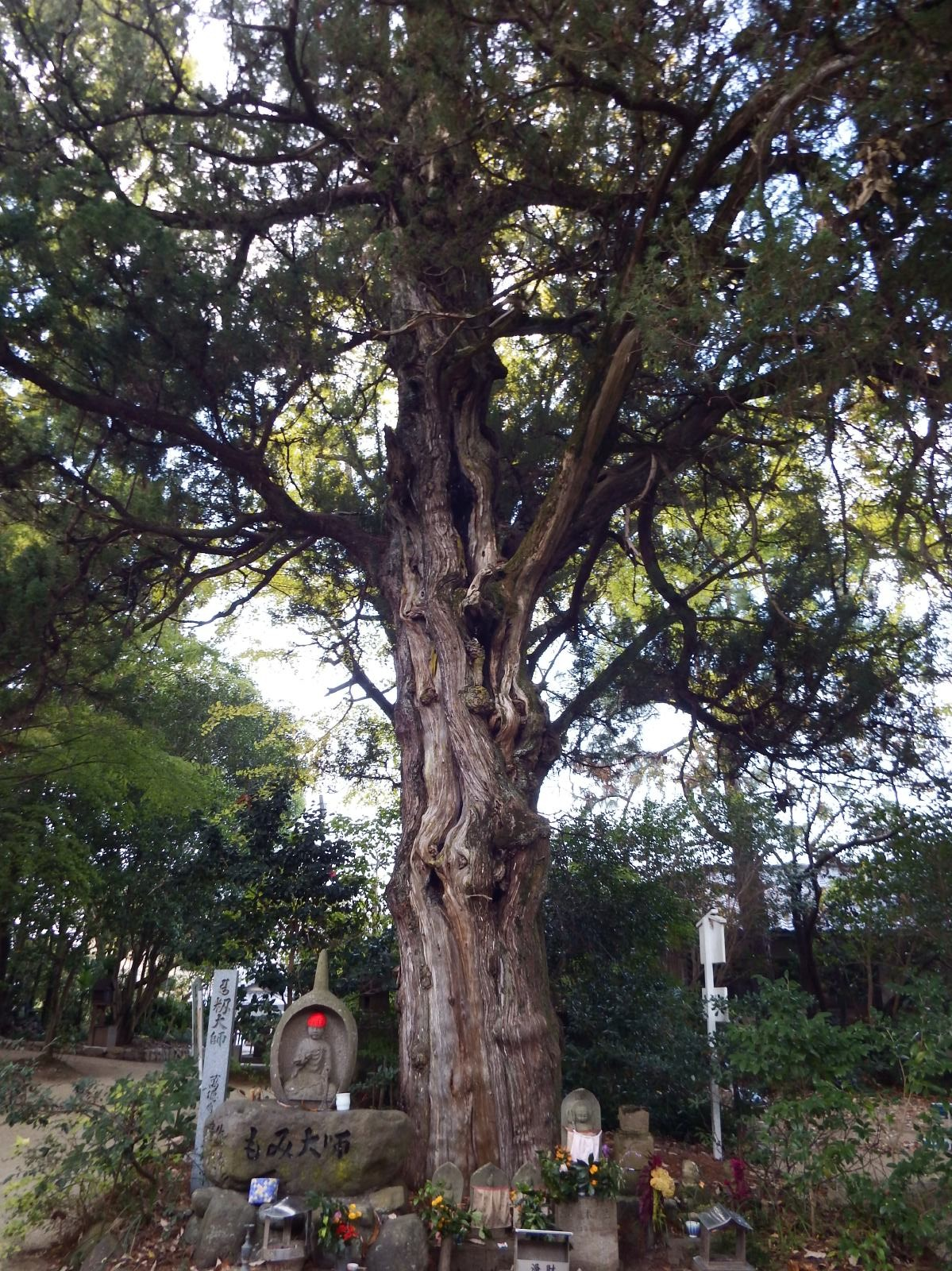
The Ibuki juniper in the center of the temple grounds (a City-Designated Natural Monument).

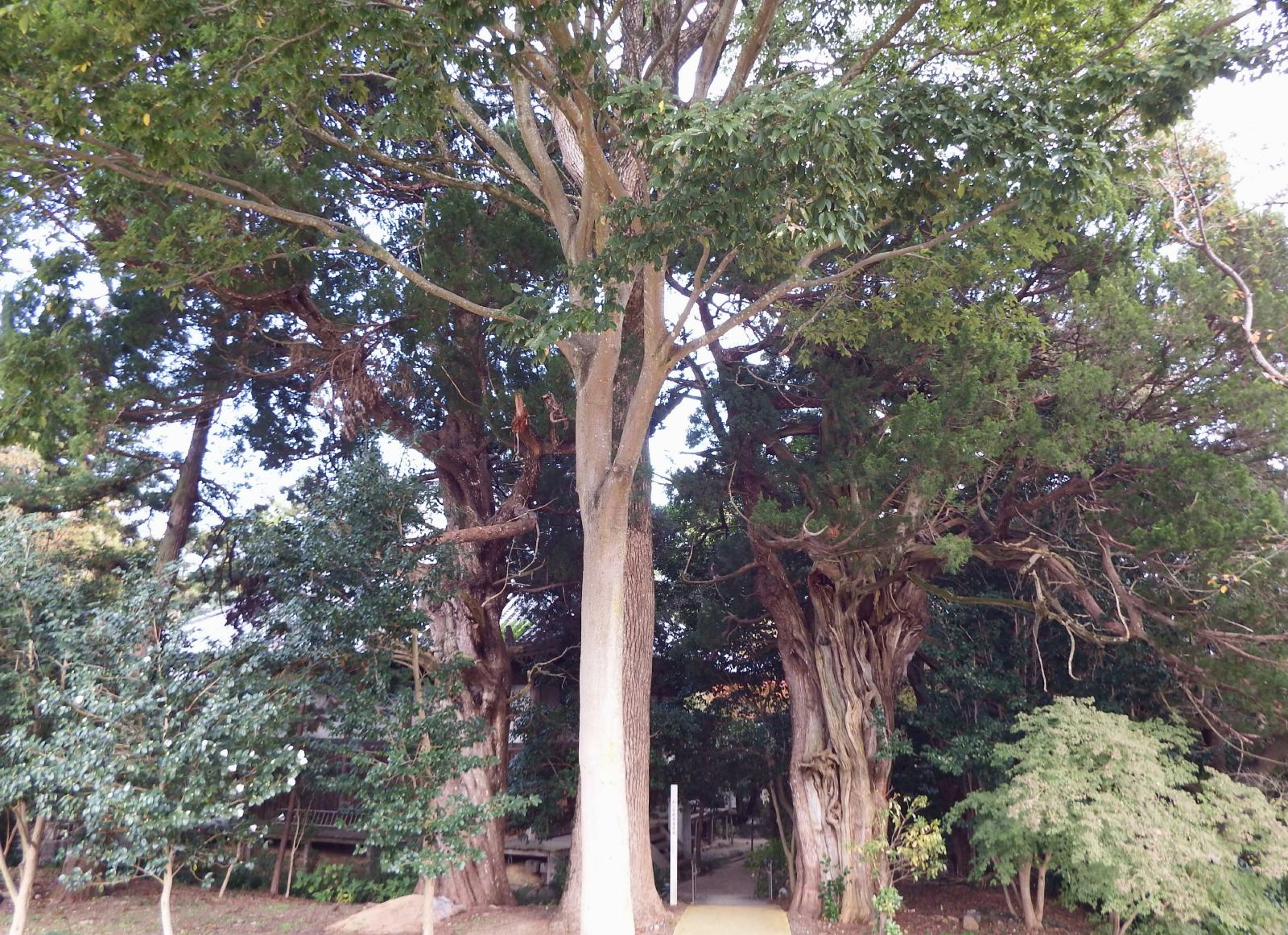
Two Ibuki junipers behind the Main Hall (City-Designated Natural Monuments).

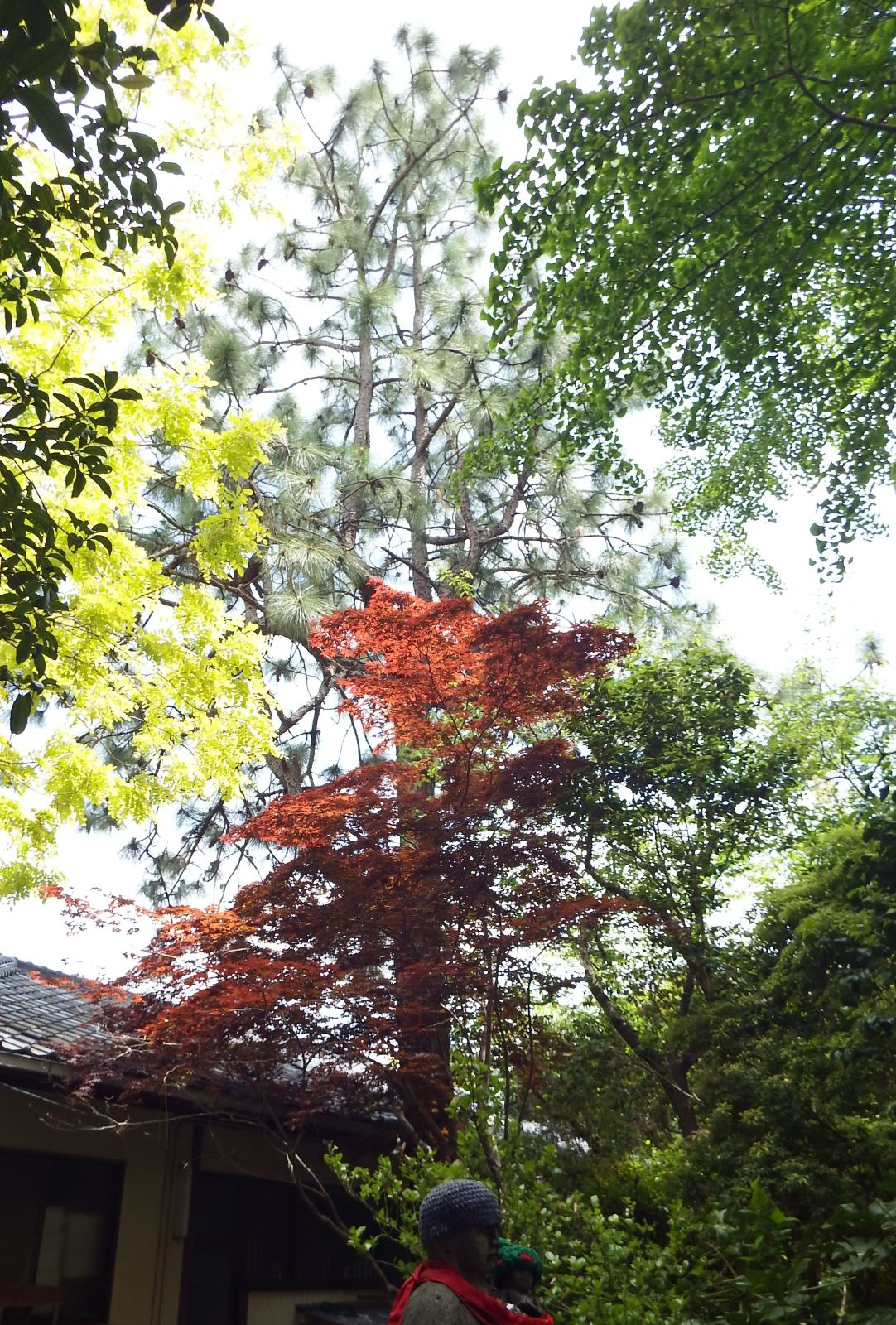
Longleaf Pine.

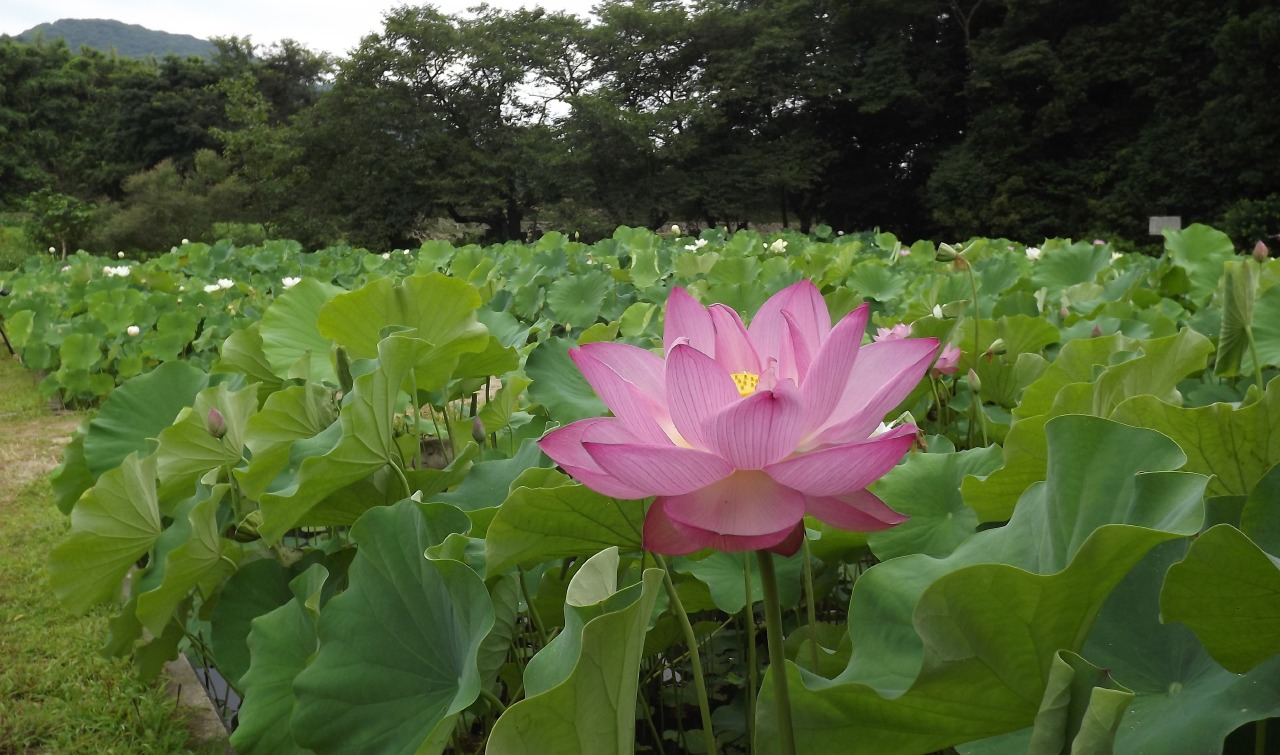
The Lotus Garden.

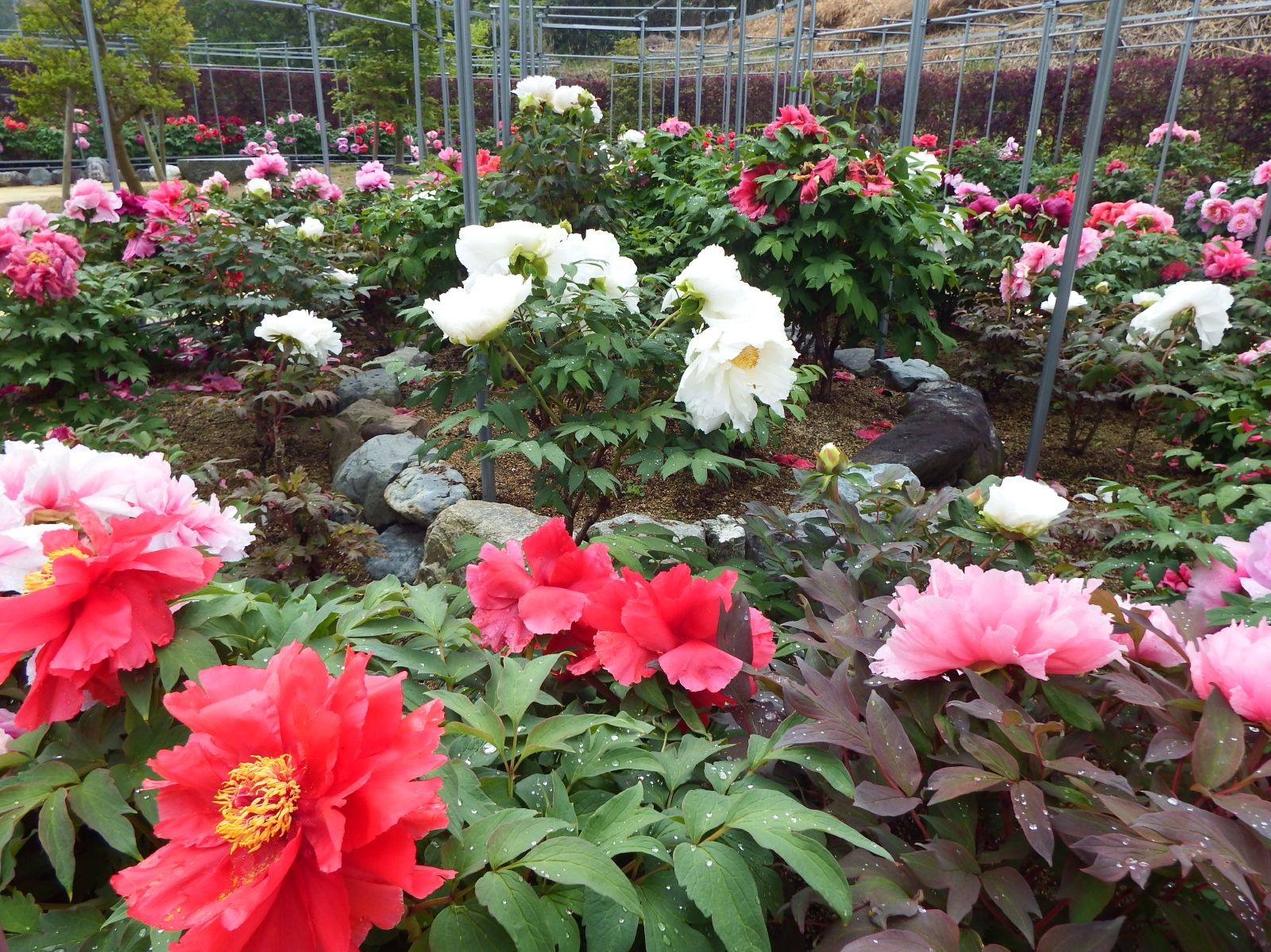
The Peony Garden.

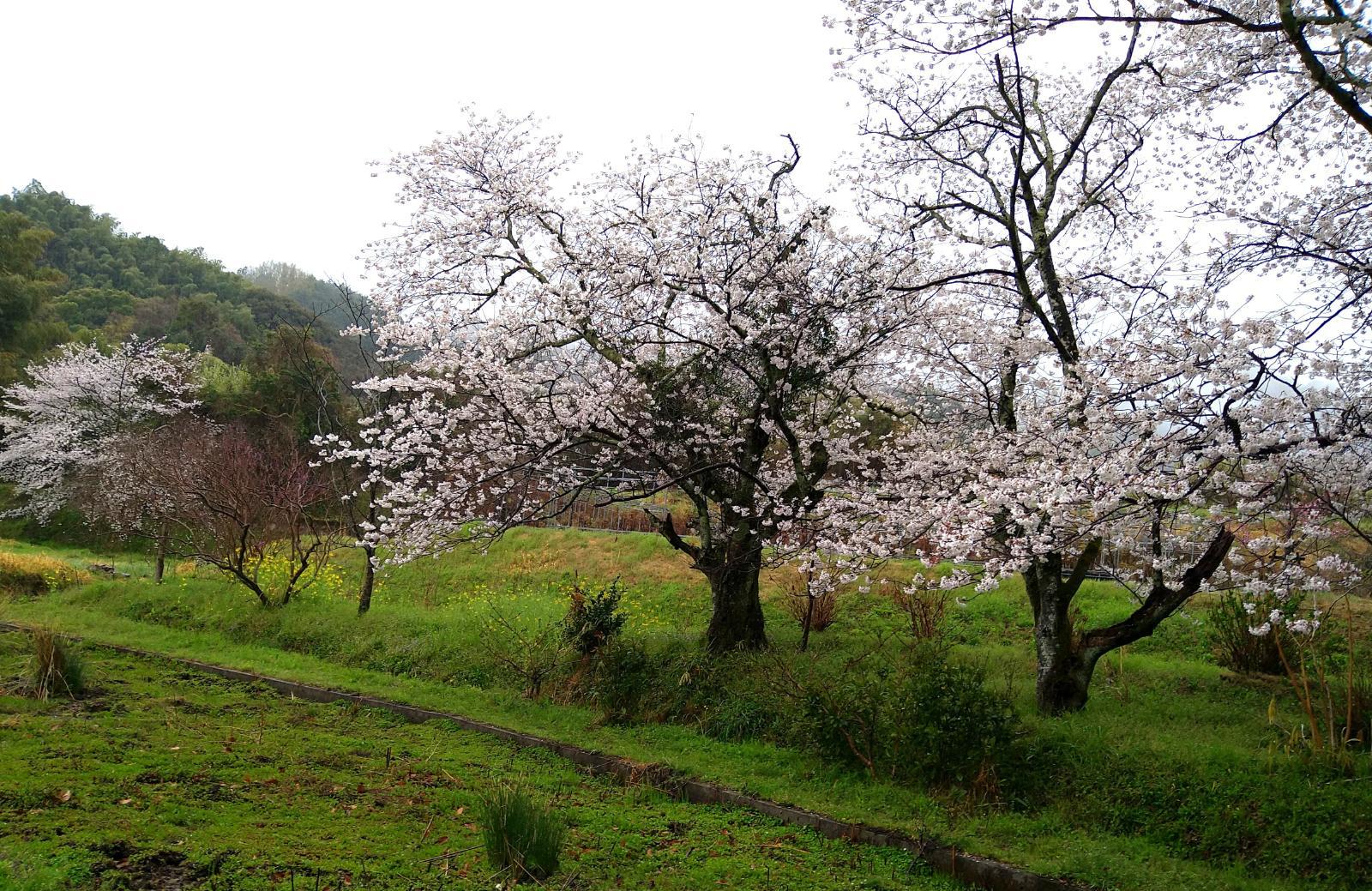
A tranquil, unspoiled rural landscape lies behind the temple grounds.

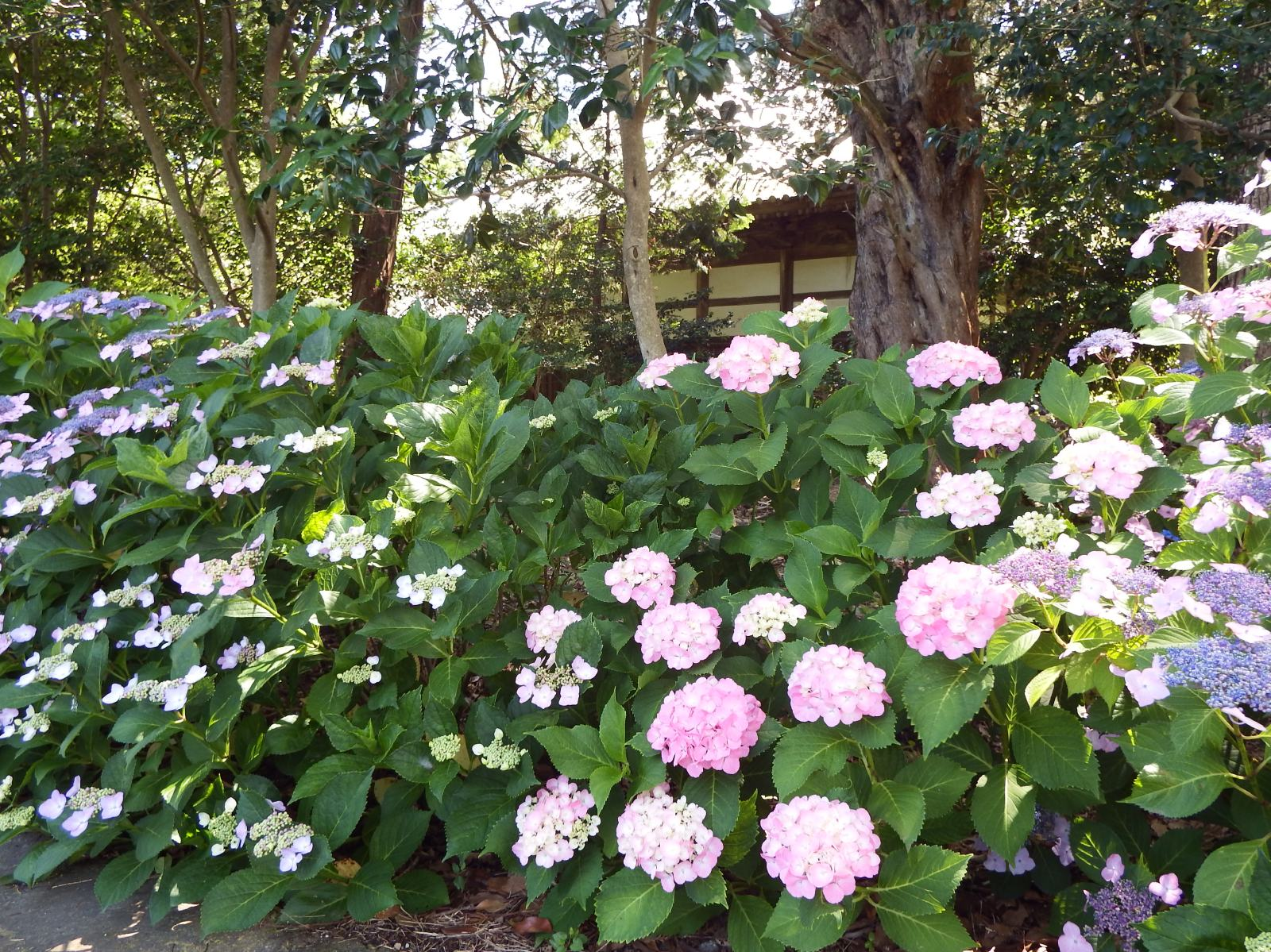
Hydrangeas behind the Main Hall.

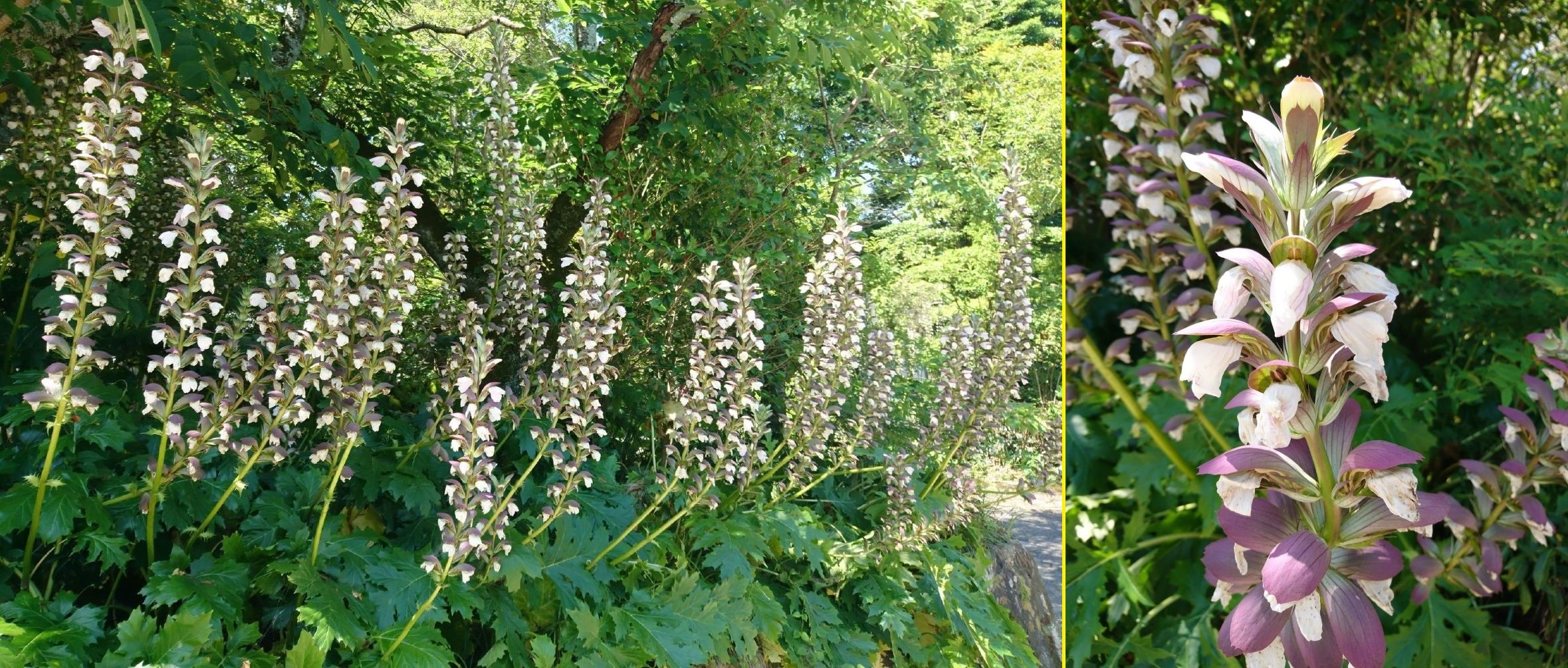
Acanthus flowers.

== Cultural Properties ==
=== National Historic Sites ===
- Iyo Pilgrimage Route: Joruriji Road and Joruriji Temple Precincts — Designated on March 20, 2023.

=== Matsuyama City Designated Natural Monuments ===
- Ibuki-byakushin (Chinese Junipers) — 3 Trees: Trunk circumferences are (1) 4.8 m, (2) 3.5 m, and (3) 3.2 m; height is 20 m; and the age of tree (1) is estimated at 600 years. Designated on October 25, 1968 (Showa 43).

== Access ==
=== Rail ===
- Iyo Railway Yokogawara Line – Takanoko Station (6.3 km)

=== Bus ===
- Iyotetsu Bus Jōruriji-mae Bus Stop (Route discontinued as of March 2021; now served by a reservation-based shared taxi service)
- Iyotetsu Bus Services bound for the Tobe area (Routes 15 & 18) → Alight at Morimatsu Eigyōsho Bus Stop → 10-minute taxi ride from the vicinity (fare applies)
- Iyotetsu Bus Services bound for Kodomo-no-Shiro (Route 15) → Alight at Nishino Bus Stop → Approx. 35-minute walk (smartphone map recommended)

=== Road ===
- Local Road: Ehime Prefectural Route 194 (Kutani-Morimatsu Station Line) – Jōruriji-mae (0.1 km)

== Nearby Unofficial Sacred Sites ==
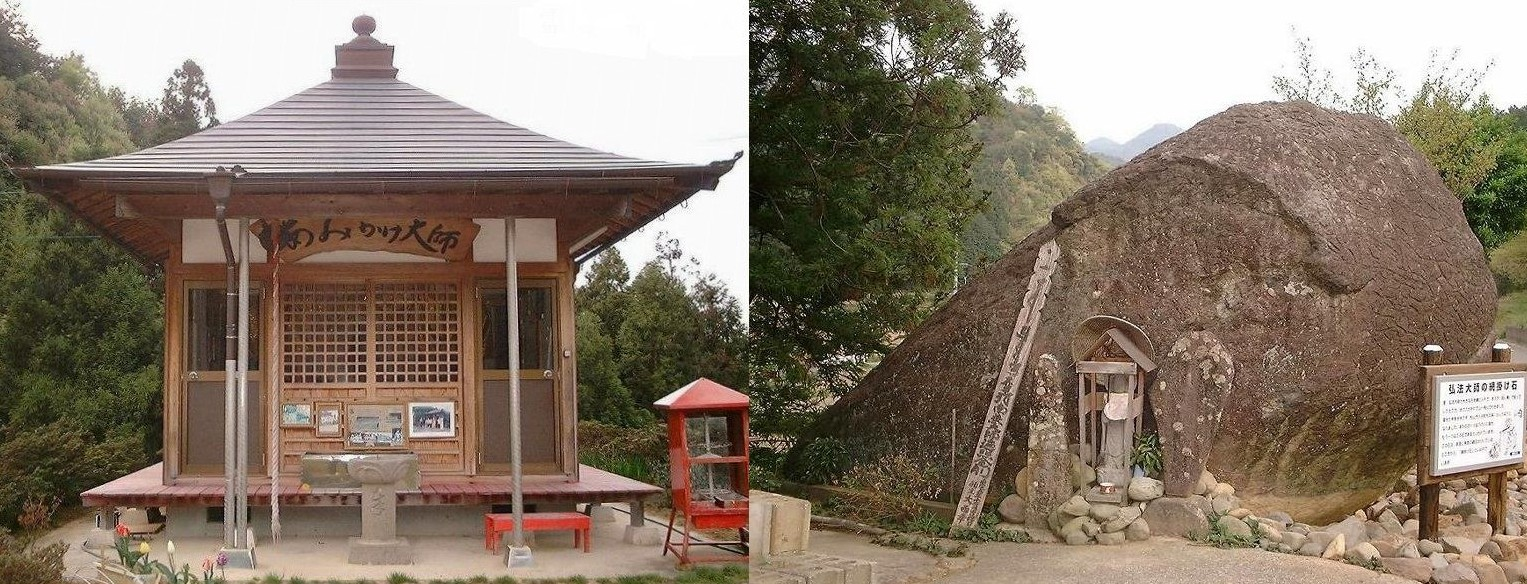
Amikake-ishi (The Net-Covered Stone)

=== Amikake-ishi (The Net-Covered Stone) ===
Located 4.3 km down the pilgrimage path from Misaka Pass in the direction of Joruri-ji Temple, there stands a large boulder with a pattern of net-like grooves carved into its surface, accompanied by a small hall dedicated to the Great Master (Daishi-do) situated nearby. According to legend, long ago, two massive stones lay across the road at Misaka, obstructing passage and causing great distress to travelers. Kukai, passing through the area, resolved to remove the stones for the sake of the villagers. He had the villagers weave a net out of kudzu vines, draped it over the two stones, and began to carry them away using an *oku* (a carrying pole). However, the stones were so incredibly heavy that the net bit deeply into them; eventually, the carrying pole snapped, sending the stones flying—one landing in the riverbed at Misaka, and the other at its current location. Furthermore, the spot where the broken carrying pole itself landed came to be known as "Okubo."

- Location: Enoki, Kutani-cho, Matsuyama City, Ehime Prefecture (33°43′58.47″N 132°50′27.22″E)

== Neighboring Temples ==
=== Shikoku Pilgrimage ===
45 Iwaya-ji --(29.5 km)-- 46 Jōruri-ji --(0.9 km)-- 47 Yasaka-ji

- Note: There are multiple routes for the pilgrimage path; the distances listed above are based on the standard route.

== Surroundings ==
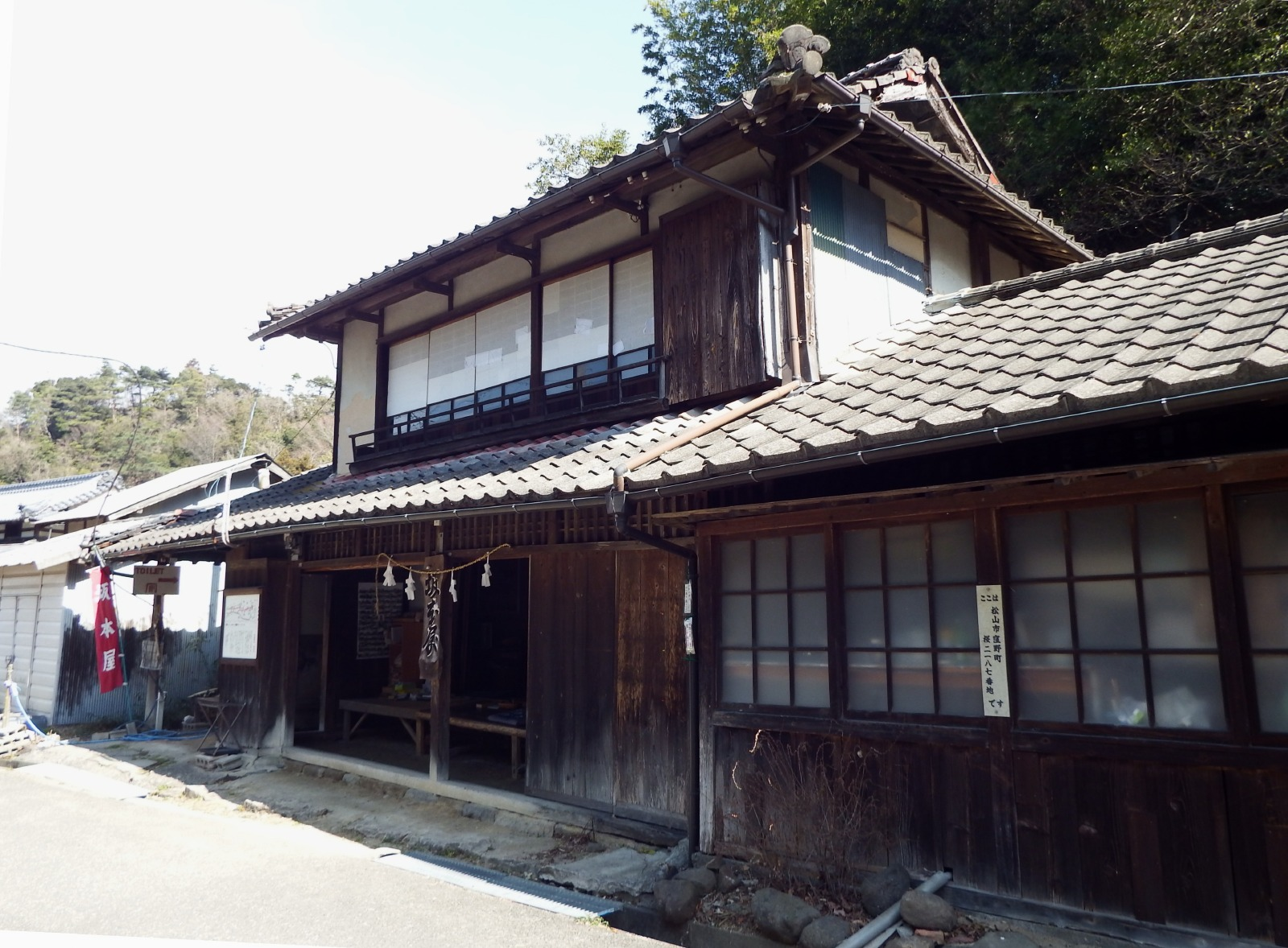
Sakamotoya

=== Sakamotoya ===
A former pilgrim's lodge situated approximately 3 km down the pilgrimage trail from Misaka Pass in the direction of Joruriji Temple. It currently serves as an osettai (hospitality) station and has also been used as a filming location for television dramas. Hospitality services provided by volunteers are offered on Saturdays and Sundays from March through November. For specific details, please refer to the "Scheduled Hospitality Dates" section on the linked website.

- Location: 2187 Kubono-cho, Matsuyama City, Ehime Prefecture (33°43′15.86″N 132°50′50.8″E)

== Bibliography ==
- Shikoku 88-Temple Pilgrimage Council, ed. (2006). Pilgrim Guide's Canon. Shikoku 88 Temple Pilgrimage Council.
- Tateki Miyazaki (2007). Shikoku Pilgrimage: Walking Alone, Yet Accompanied by Two. Vol. Map Edition (8th ed.). Henromichi Preservation Cooperation Association.

== See also ==
- Shikoku Pilgrimage
