= Thirteen Buddhist Sites of Iyo =

Group of Buddhist sacred sites in Japan

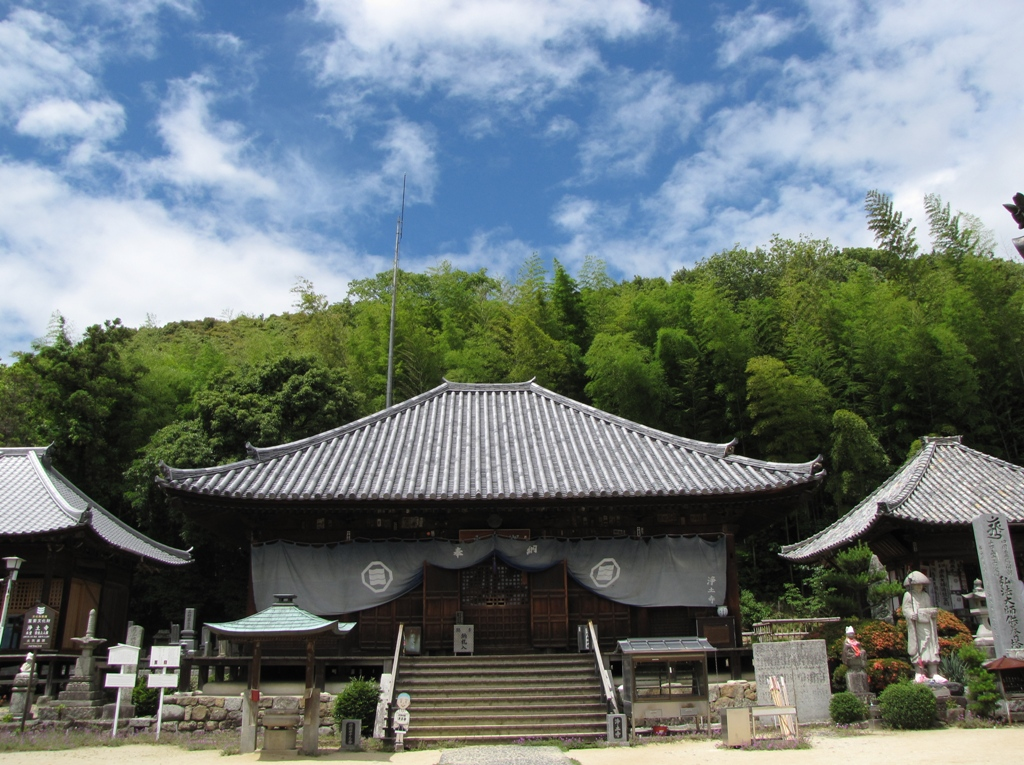
Jōdo-ji

The Thirteen Buddhist Sites of Iyo（伊予十三仏霊場, Iyo jūsan butsu reijō）are a group of fifteen Buddhist sacred sites in Ehime Prefecture dedicated to the Thirteen Buddhas. (Iyo Province was the former name of Ehime Prefecture on Shikoku Island.) The majority of the temples in this grouping are part of Japanese esoteric Shingon Buddhism. Several temples are also included in the Shikoku 88 temple pilgrimage.

== Directory ==
Number	Temple	Sect	Dedication	Location
Beginning temple	Myōjō-in	Tendai Jimon	Kannon Bosatsu	Matsuyama
1.	Dairen-ji (Matsuyama)	Shingon-shu Buzan-ha	Fudō-myōō	Matsuyama
2.	Jōdo-ji	Shingon-shu Buzan-ha	Shaka Nyorai	Matsuyama
3.	Taisan-ji	Shingon-shu Buzan-ha	Monju Bosatsu	Matsuyama
4.	Enpuku-ji	Tendai	Fugen Bosatsu	Matsuyama
5.	Jizō-in	Shingon-shu Buzan-ha	Jizō Bosatsu	Matsuyama
6.	Gokuraku-ji	Shingon-shu Buzan-ha	Miroku Bosatsu	Matsuyama
7.	Kōjaku-ji	Kōyasan Shingon-shū	Yakushi Nyorai	Tōon
8.	Sairin-ji	Shingon-shu Buzan-ha	Kannon Bosatsu	Matsuyama
9.	Dōon-ji	Shingon-shu Buzan-ha	Seishi Bosatsu	Tōon
10.	Yasaka-ji	Daigo Shingon	Amida Nyorai	Matsuyama
11.	Kōon-ji	Shingon-shu Buzan-ha	Ashuku Nyorai	Matsuyama
12.	Rishō-in	Shingon-shū Chizan-ha	Dainichi Nyorai	Iyo, Tobe
13.	Jōgan-ji	Shingon-shu Buzan-ha	Kokūzō Bosatsu	Matsuyama
Final temple	Konpira-ji	Shingon-shu Buzan-ha	Kompira Daigongen	Tōon

== See also ==
- Thirteen Buddhas
