= Jōdo-ji =

Jōdo-ji may refer to:

- Jōdo-ji (Matsuyama), a Buddhist temple in Matsuyama, Ehime Prefecture, Japan
- Jōdo-ji (Ono), a Buddhist temple in Ono, Hyōgo Prefecture, Japan
- Jōdo-ji (Onomichi), a Buddhist temple in Onomichi, Hiroshima Prefecture, Japan
