= Yasaka-ji =

Buddhist temple in Ehime Prefecture, Japan

Coordinates: 33.7579°N 132.8129°E

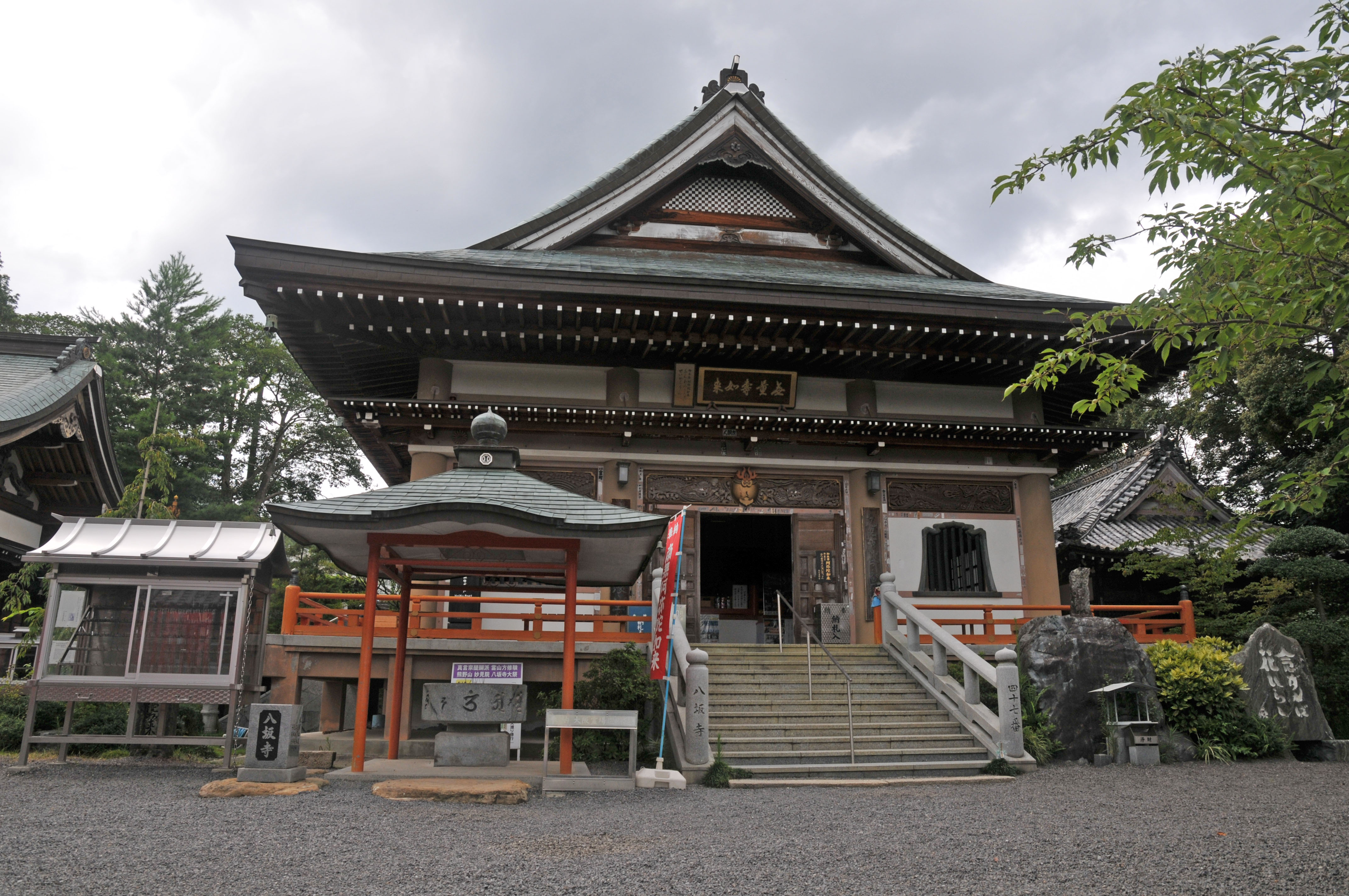
Main hall

Yasaka-ji (八坂寺) is a Buddhist temple in Matsuyama, Ehime Prefecture, Japan. Yasaka-ji is Temple 10 of the Thirteen Buddhist Sites of Iyo, and temple number 47 of the Shikoku 88 temple pilgrimage. It is traditionally believed to have been founded in 701.

== Founding ==
According to tradition, the temple was founded in 701 by Shugendo founder En no Gyōja, and the original main hall was built by Ochi Tamaoki the governor of Iyo province, who built it at the behest of Emperor Monmu. The temple was then later supposedly rebuilt by Kūkai in 815 during his time in Shikoku.

== History ==
In the Kamakura period, Yasaka-ji became an important Kumano temple, administering 48 branch temples and supporting numerous monks and soldiers. However, it was destroyed during the wars in the 1500s, and rebuilt as a smaller temple.

== Buildings ==
The temple consists of several buildings, the Main Hall, built in 1984, the Gongen Hall, the Enma Hall, the Daishi Hall, and the Juni-sha Gongen Hall.

== Statues ==
There are a number of statues on the grounds of the temple, including large statues of Fudō Myōō and En no Gyōja. There are also 8,000 ceramic Amida Buddha statues purchased by devotees and displayed by the temple, each with the name of the devotee written on them.

== Legends ==
The name of the temple, Yasaka-ji translates as "Eight Hill Temple". Close to the temple there are eight burial tumuli said to be the graves of Emon Saburō's sons. It is likely that it is there tumuli that the temple is named for.

== Shikoku 88 temple pilgrimage ==
Yasaka-ji is 47th temple on the Shikoku 88 temple pilgrimage circuit. It is approximately 17 minutes walk from Joruriji, the 46th temple, and 65 minutes walk to Sairinji, the 48th temple

== Principle deity ==
The principle image (deity) of the temple is Amida Nyorai. It is supposedly the work of high priest, Eshin Sozu Genshin (942–1017).

== See also ==
- Thirteen Buddhist Sites of Iyo
