= Taisan-ji (Matsuyama) =

Buddhist temple in Ehime Prefecture, Japan

Coordinates: 33°53′6.3″N 132°42′53.8″E

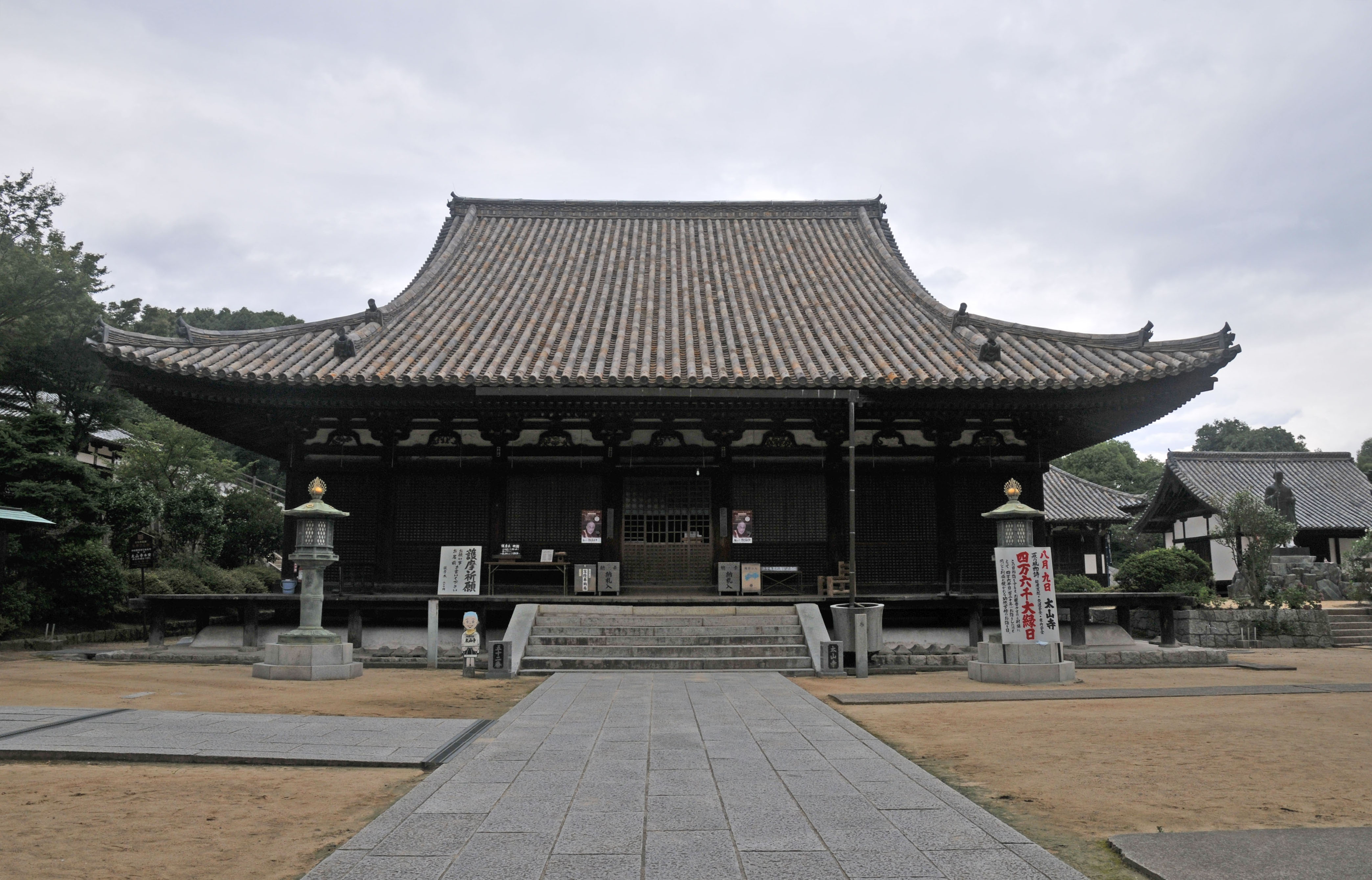
Taisan-ji Hondō (Kamakura period), a National Treasure

Taisan-ji (太山寺) is a Shingon temple in Matsuyama, Ehime Prefecture, Japan. It is Temple 52 on the Shikoku 88 temple pilgrimage, and Temple 3 on the Thirteen Buddhist Sites of Iyo. The Hondō is a National Treasure.

== History ==
Taisan-ji is said to have been founded by a wealthy merchant from Kyushu in the sixth century, after he had been saved from a shipwreck by Jūichimen Kannon. The temple enjoyed imperial patronage from the time of Emperor Shōmu.

== Buildings ==
- Hondō (Kamakura period), (National Treasure)
- Niōmon (Kamakura period) (Important Cultural Property)

== Treasures ==
- Wooden statue of Jūichimen Kannon (木造十一面観音立像) (Heian period) (Important Cultural Property)
- Wooden statue of Jūichimen Kannon (hibutsu) (木造十一面観音立像) (Heian period) (Important Cultural Property)

== See also ==
- Shikoku 88 temple pilgrimage
- List of National Treasures of Japan (temples)
- Thirteen Buddhist Sites of Iyo
