= Jōdo-ji (Matsuyama) =

Buddhist temple in Ehime Prefecture, Japan

Coordinates: 33°49′0.1″N 132°48′30.3″E

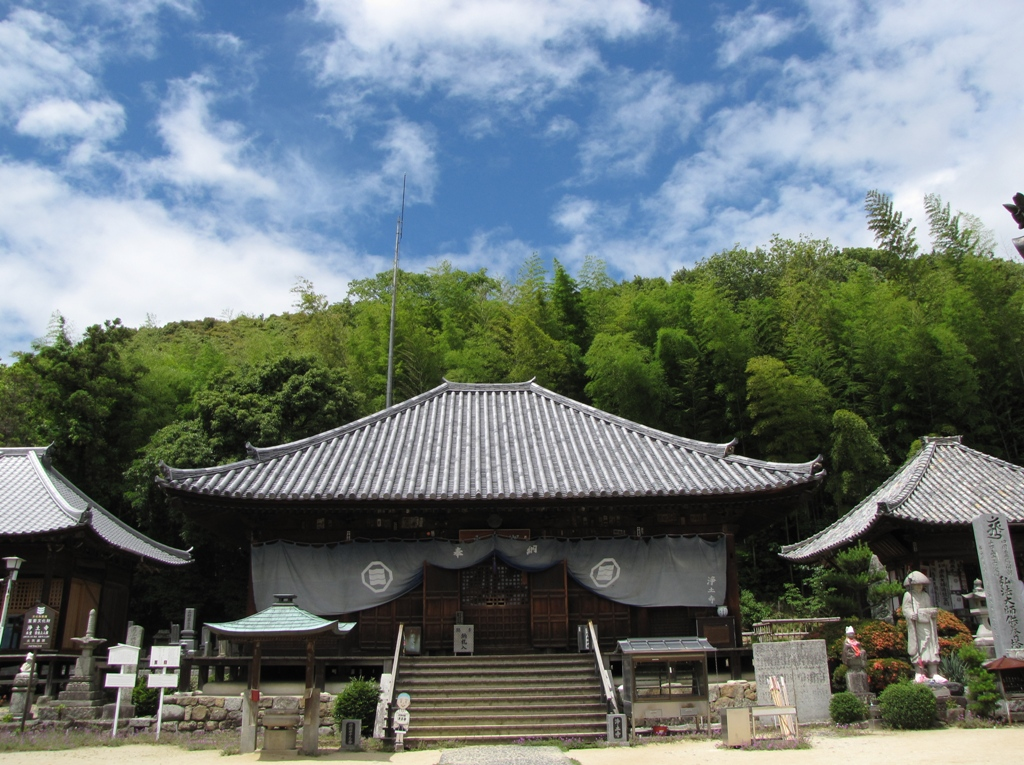
Jōdo-ji Hondō (1482), an Important Cultural Property

Jōdo-ji (浄土寺) is a Shingon temple in Matsuyama, Japan. It is Temple 49 on the Shikoku 88 temple pilgrimage, and temple two on The Thirteen Buddhist Sites of Iyo.

== History ==
Said to have been founded by Gyōki, Kūya lodged at the temple for three years. Burned during fighting in 1416, it was rebuilt by the Kōno clan. Sixteenth-century graffiti indicates that by that time Tendai priests and members of the peasantry had joined the ranks of pilgrims.

== Buildings ==
- Hondō (1482), an Important Cultural Property.

== Treasures ==
- Wooden statue of Kūya chanting (木造空也上人立像) (Kamakura period) (ICP)

== See also ==
- Shikoku 88 temple pilgrimage
