= Misaka Pass =

Mountain pass in Japan

Misaka Pass 神坂峠
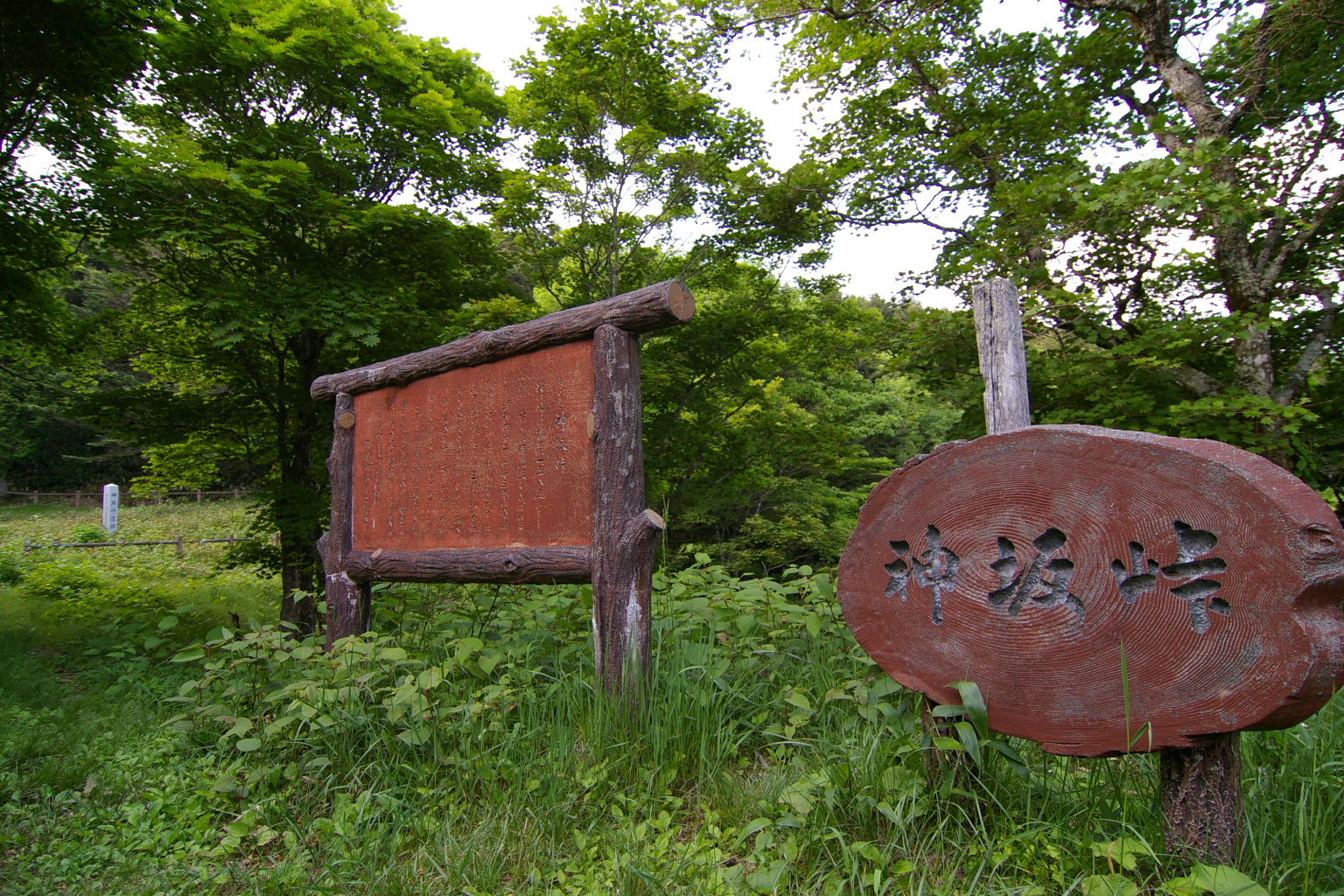
- Highest point of Misaka Pass

- Location within Nagano Prefecture Location within Japan
- Elevation: 1,569 m (5,148 ft)

Location
- Location: Nagano–Gifu border, Japan
- Range: Kiso Mountains
- Coordinates: 35°28′19″N 137°37′55″E
- National Historic Site of Japan

Misaka Pass (神坂峠, Misaka-tōge) is a mountain pass through the southern end of the Kiso Mountains, connecting the city of Nakatsugawa, Gifu with the village of Achi, Nagano. The highest point on the pass is 1,569 metres (5,148 ft). The pass is accessible by car via a forestry road from the Gifu side; however, due to the danger of falling rocks, the road on the Nagano side of the pass is closed to vehicular traffic. The modern 8600-meter Enayama Tunnel on the Chūō Expressway is located approximately a kilometer north of the pass.

== Overview ==
The Misaka Pass is the highest point on the ancient Tōsandō highway connecting Ina District in Shinano Province with Ena District in Mino Province. It is mentioned in the Nara period Nihon Shoki chronicles as a location where the legendary warrior Yamato Takeru was harassed by mountain kami on his way to conquer eastern Japan, and where he shot and killed a white deer which was an avatar of the kami on his return journey. This legend was a reflection of the evil reputation of the pass, which was steep, isolated, and long, and often plagued by bandits who preyed on travelers. The pass is mentioned in Nara and Heian period poetry anthologies, including the Man'yōshū and Kokin Wakashū, the Genji Monogatari, Konjaku Monogatarishū, and Ugetsu Monogatari. The route of the later Nakasendō highway avoided Misaka Pass by detouring through the Kiso Valley, and by the Kamakura period the original route was gradually abandoned.

== National Historic Site ==
In 1921, fragments of Sue ware pottery and other artifacts were discovered in the pass, and per an archaeological excavation in 1967, more than 1300 artifacts were discovered, including a kofun tumulus with a diameter of four meters and height of 0.7 meters. Artifacts ranged from fragments of bronze mirrors, knives and swords, various types of Sue ware and Haji ware pottery, and beads, including cylindrical, spherical, magatama and others. These artifacts dated from the Kofun period through the early Heian period and are presumed to have been ritual offerings from travelers for safety from the malevolent kami and other supernatural forces when attempting to cross the summit of the pass. The pass was designated a National Historic Site of Japan in 1981. It is located about one hour by car from Iida Station on the JR East Iida Line.

== See also ==
- List of Historic Sites of Japan (Nagano)
