= Sairin-ji (Matsuyama) =

Temple in Shikoku, Japan

Coordinates: 33.7937°N 132.8140°E

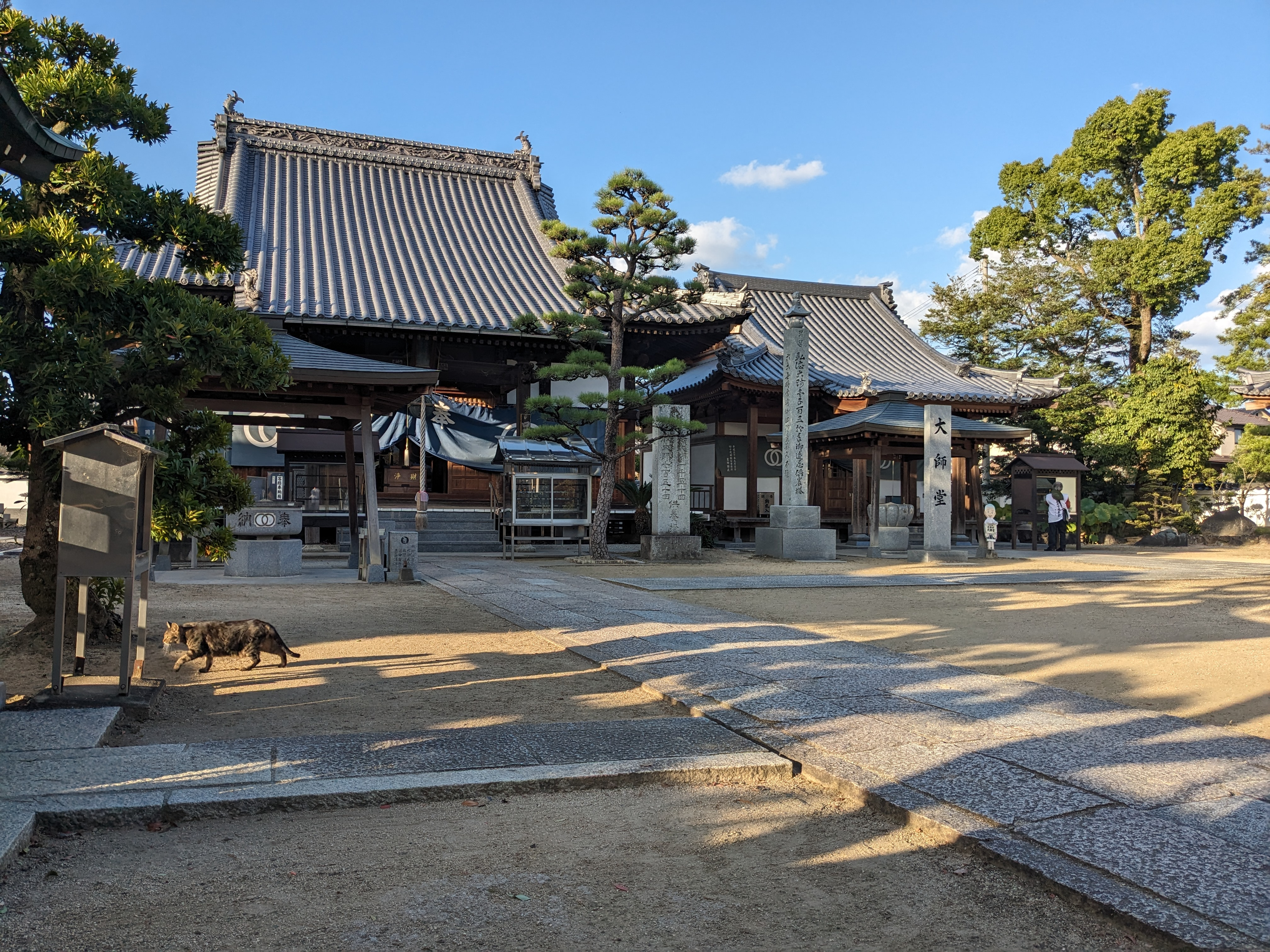
Sairin-ji main hall (left) and Daishidō (right)

Sairin-ji (Japanese: 西林寺) is a Shingon Buddhist temple in the city of Matsuyama (Ehime prefecture). It is temple number 48 of the Shikoku Pilgrimage. According to legend, a stream running by the temple was found by Kōbō Daishi striking the ground with his cane.
