= Guanyin =

East Asian manifestation of the Bodhisattva Avalokiteśvara

- Goddess of Mercy
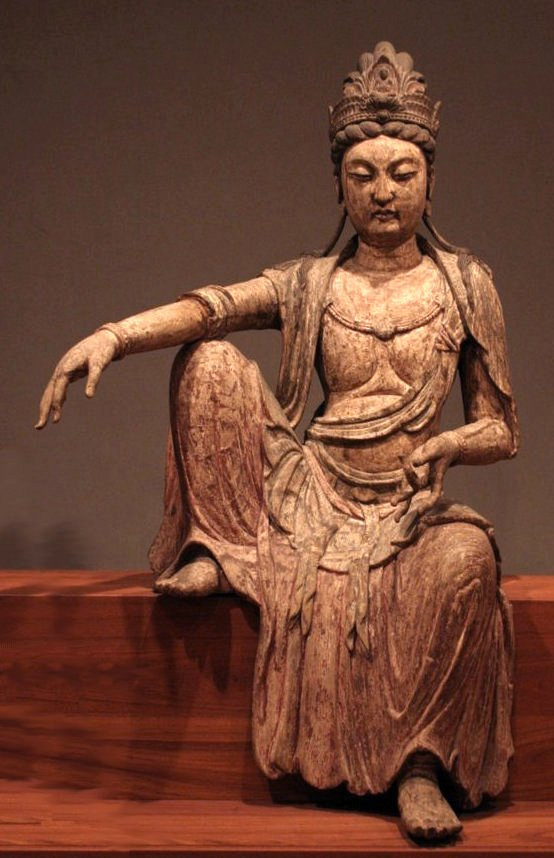
- Wood carving of Guanyin with Amitābha on their crown. Northern Song dynasty, c. 1025
- Venerated in: Buddhism; Taoism; Chinese folk religion Yiguandao
- Abode: Mount Putuo
- Animals: White parrot
- Symbols: Vase; Willow branch

Guanyin

Chinese name
- Traditional Chinese: 觀音
- Simplified Chinese: 观音
Transcriptions
Standard Mandarin
- Hanyu Pinyin: Guānyīn
- Wade–Giles: Kuan^{1}-yin^{1}
- IPA: [kwán.ín]
Wu
- Romanization: Kuoe^{1}-In^{1}
- Suzhounese: Kuoe^{1}-In^{1}
Gan
- Romanization: Guon In
Hakka
- Romanization: Guān Rhīm
Yue: Cantonese
- Yale Romanization: Gūnyām
- Jyutping: Gun1-jam1
- IPA: [kun˥.jɐm˥]
Southern Min
- Hokkien POJ: Koan-im
- Tâi-lô: Kuan-im

Full Chinese name
- Traditional Chinese: 觀世音
- Simplified Chinese: 观世音
- Literal meaning: "[The One Who] Perceives the Sounds of the World"
Transcriptions
Standard Mandarin
- Hanyu Pinyin: Guānshìyīn
- Wade–Giles: Kuan^{1}-shih^{4}-yin^{1}
Wu
- Romanization: Kuoe^{1}-Sy^{5}-In^{1}
- Suzhounese: Kuoe^{1}-Syu^{5}-In^{1}
Hakka
- Romanization: Guān Shè Rhīm
Yue: Cantonese
- Yale Romanization: Gūnsai Yām
- Jyutping: Gun1 Sai3 Jam1
Southern Min
- Hokkien POJ: Koan-sè-im
- Tâi-lô: Kuan-sè-im

Second alternative Chinese name
- Traditional Chinese: 觀自在
- Simplified Chinese: 观自在
- Literal meaning: "Lord who Gazes down on the World"
Transcriptions
Standard Mandarin
- Hanyu Pinyin: Guānzìzài
- Wade–Giles: Kuan^{1}tzu^{4}tsai^{4}
Yue: Cantonese
- Jyutping: Gun1 Zi6 Zoi6

Third alternative Chinese name
- Traditional Chinese: 觀音媽
- Simplified Chinese: 观音妈
Transcriptions
Southern Min
- Hokkien POJ: Koan-im-má
- Tâi-lô: Kuan-im-má

Burmese name
- Burmese: ကွမ်ယင်
- IPA: [kwàɴ jɪ̀ɴ]

Tibetan name
- Tibetan: སྤྱན་རས་གཟིགས

Vietnamese name
- Vietnamese alphabet: Quan Âm (Quán Âm); Quán Thế Âm (Quan Thế Âm); Quán Tự Tại
- Chữ Hán: 觀音 觀世音 觀自在

Thai name
- Thai: กวนอิม, พระอวโลกิเตศวรโพธิสัตว์
- RTGS: Kuan Im, Phra Awalokitesuanphotisat

Korean name
- Hangul: 관음, 관세음, 관자재
- Hanja: 觀音, 觀世音, 觀自在
Transcriptions
- Revised Romanization: Gwaneum, Gwanseeum, Gwanjajae
- McCune–Reischauer: Kwanŭm, Kwanseŭm, Kwanjajae

Mongolian name
- Mongolian Cyrillic: Жанрайсаг, Арьяабал
- Mongolian script: ᠵᠠᠨᠷᠠᠢᠰᠠᠭ᠂ ᠠᠷᠢᠶᠠᠪᠠᠯᠣ
Transcriptions
- SASM/GNC: Janraisag, Ariyabalu

Japanese name
- Kanji: 観音, 観世音, 観自在
- Hiragana: かんのん, かんぜおん, かんじざい
Transcriptions
- Romanization: Kannon, Kanzeon, Kanjizai

Indonesian name
- Indonesian: Kwan Im, Kwan She Im, Awalokiteswara

Filipino name
- Tagalog: Kuan im ma (ᜃᜓᜀᜈ᜔ᜁᜋ᜔ᜋ)

Sanskrit name
- Sanskrit: अवलोकितेश्वर (Avalokiteśvara)

Khmer name
- Khmer: អវលោកិតេស្វរៈ (Avalokitesvarak), អវលោកេស្វរៈ (Avalokesvarak), លោកេស្វរៈ (Lokesvarak)

Hmong name
- Hmong: Kabyeeb, Niam-Txiv Kabyeeb, Dabpog, Niam-Txiv Dabpog

Guanyin (Chinese: 觀音; pinyin: Guānyīn; Jyutping: Gun1 jam1) is a common Chinese name of the Bodhisattva associated with compassion known as Avalokiteśvara (Sanskrit: अवलोकितेश्वर). Guanyin is short for Guanshiyin, which means "[The One Who] Perceives the Sounds of the World". Originally regarded as male in Indian Buddhism, Guanyin has been more commonly depicted as female in China and most of East Asia since about the 12th century. Due to sociogeographical factors, Guanyin may also be historically depicted as genderless or androgynous. On the 19th day of the sixth lunar month, Guanyin's attainment of Buddhahood is celebrated. Guanyin has been incorporated in other religions, including Taoism and Chinese folk religion. (Note: For Details, see the #Role in other Eastern religions.)

Some Buddhists believe that when one of their adherents departs from this world, they are placed by Guanyin in the heart of a lotus and then sent to the western pure land of Sukhāvatī. Guanyin is often referred to as the "most widely beloved Buddhist Divinity" with miraculous powers to assist all those who pray to her, as is mentioned in the universal gate chapter of the Lotus Sutra and the Kāraṇḍavyūha Sūtra.

Several large temples in East Asia are dedicated to Guanyin, including Shaolin Monastery, Longxing Temple, Dule Temple, Puning Temple, Nanhai Guanyin Temple, Kwan Im Thong Hood Cho Temple, Shitennō-ji, Sensō-ji, Kiyomizu-dera, Sanjūsangen-dō, and many others. Guanyin's abode and bodhimaṇḍa in India are recorded as being on Mount Potalaka. With the localization of the belief in Guanyin, each area adopted its own Potalaka. In Chinese Buddhism, Mount Putuo is considered the bodhimaṇḍa of Guanyin. Naksansa is considered to be the Potalaka of Guanyin in Korea. Japan's Potalaka is located at Fudarakusan-ji. Tibet's is the Potala Palace. Vietnam's Potalaka is the Hương Temple.

There are several pilgrimage centers for Guanyin in East Asia. Putuoshan (Mount Putuo) is the main pilgrimage site in China. There is a 33-temple Guanyin pilgrimage in Korea, which includes Naksansa. In Japan, there are several pilgrimages associated with Guanyin. The oldest one of them is the Saigoku Kannon Pilgrimage, a pilgrimage through 33 temples with Guanyin shrines. Guanyin is beloved by most Buddhist traditions in a nondenominational way and is found in most Tibetan temples under the name Chenrézik (Wylie: Spyan ras gzigs). Guanyin is also beloved and worshipped in the temples in Nepal. The Hiranya Varna Mahavihar, located in Patan, is one example. Guanyin is also found in some influential Theravada temples, such as Gangaramaya Temple, Kelaniya, and Natha Devale, near the Temple of the Tooth in Sri Lanka. Guanyin can also be found in Thailand's Temple of the Emerald Buddha, Wat Huay Pla Kang (where the huge statue of her is often mistakenly called the "Big Buddha"), and Myanmar's Shwedagon Pagoda. Statues of Guanyin are a widely depicted subject of Asian art and are found in the Asian art sections of most museums in the world.

== Etymology and usage ==
=== Avalokitasvara ===
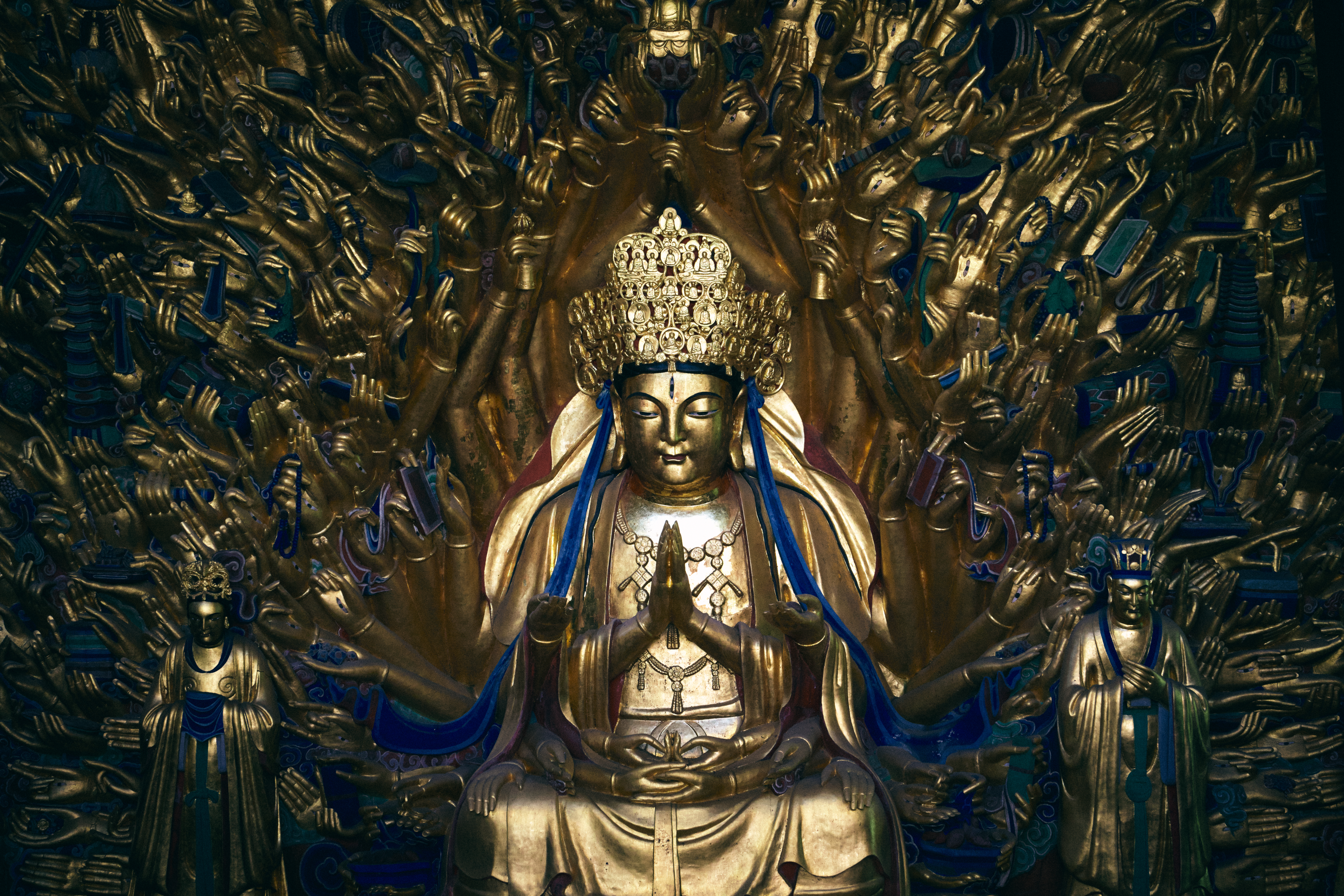
Tang dynasty (618–907) rock statue of the Thousand-Armed Guanyin (Qianshou Guanyin) at Baodingshan at the Dazu Rock Carving in Chongqing, China.

Guānyīn is a translation from the Sanskrit Avalokitasvara, the name of the Mahāyāna Bodhisattva. Another name for this Bodhisattva is Guānzìzài (traditional Chinese: 觀自在; simplified Chinese: 观自在; pinyin: Guānzìzài), from Sanskrit Avalokiteśvara. It was initially thought that early translators mistook Avalokiteśvara for Avalokitasvara and thus mistranslated Avalokiteśvara as Guānyīn, which explained why Xuanzang translated Avalokiteśvara as Guānzìzài. However, the original form was indeed Avalokitasvara which contained morpheme svara ("sound, noise") and was a compound meaning "sound perceiver", literally "he who looks down upon sound" (i.e., the cries of sentient beings who need help). This is the exact equivalent of the Chinese translation Guānyīn. This etymology was furthered in the Chinese by the tendency of some Chinese translators, notably Kumārajīva, to use the variant Guānshìyīn, literally " One who perceives the world's lamentations"—wherein lok was read as simultaneously meaning both "to look" and "world" (Skt. loka; Ch. 世, shì).

Direct translations from the Sanskrit name Avalokitasvara include:

- Chinese: Guanyin (觀音), Guanshiyin (觀世音)

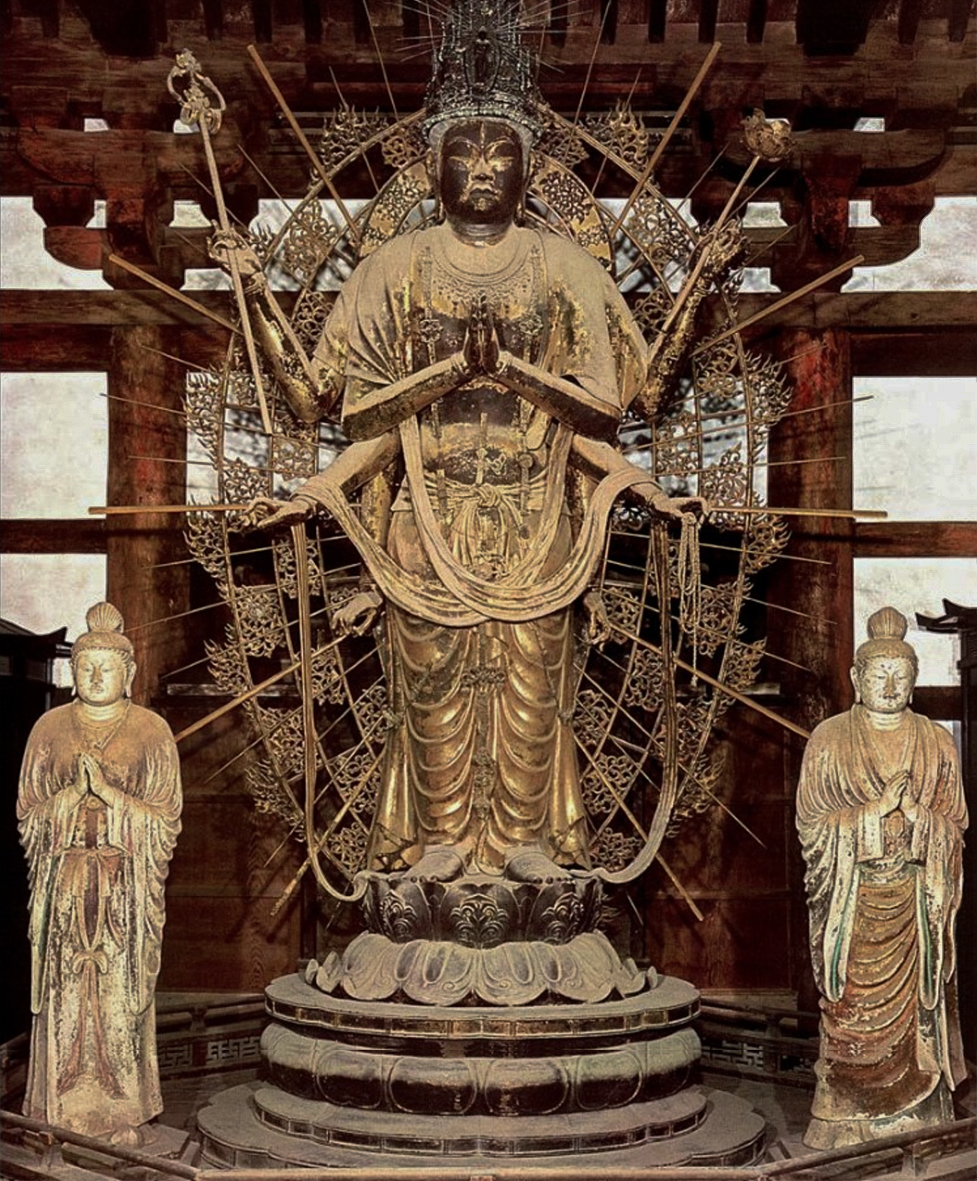
Amoghapāśa Lokesvara (Japanese: Fukūkenjaku Kannon) with devas Brahma and Indra on either side dated to late 8th century) located at Tōdai-ji, Nara, Japan.

=== Avalokiteśvara ===
The name Avalokitasvara was later supplanted by the Avalokiteśvara form containing the ending -īśvara, which does not occur in Sanskrit before the seventh century. The original form Avalokitasvara appears in Sanskrit fragments of the fifth century. The original meaning of the name "Avalokitasvara" fits the Buddhist understanding of the role of a Bodhisattva.

While some of those who revered Avalokiteśvara upheld the Buddhist rejection of the doctrine of any creator god, Encyclopædia Britannica does cite Avalokiteśvara as the creator god of the world. This position is taken in the widely used Kāraṇḍavyūha Sūtra with its well-known mantra Oṃ maṇi padme hūṃ. In addition, the Lotus Sutra is the first time the Avalokiteśvara is mentioned. Chapter 25 refers to him as Lokeśvara "Lord God of all beings" and Lokanātha "Lord and Protector of all beings" and ascribes extreme attributes of divinity to him.

Direct translations from the Sanskrit name Avalokiteśvara include:

- Chinese: 觀自在; pinyin: Guānzìzài
- Tibetan: སྤྱན་རས་གཟིགས་དབང་ཕྱུག།, THL: Chenrézig Wangchuk

== Names in other Asian languages ==
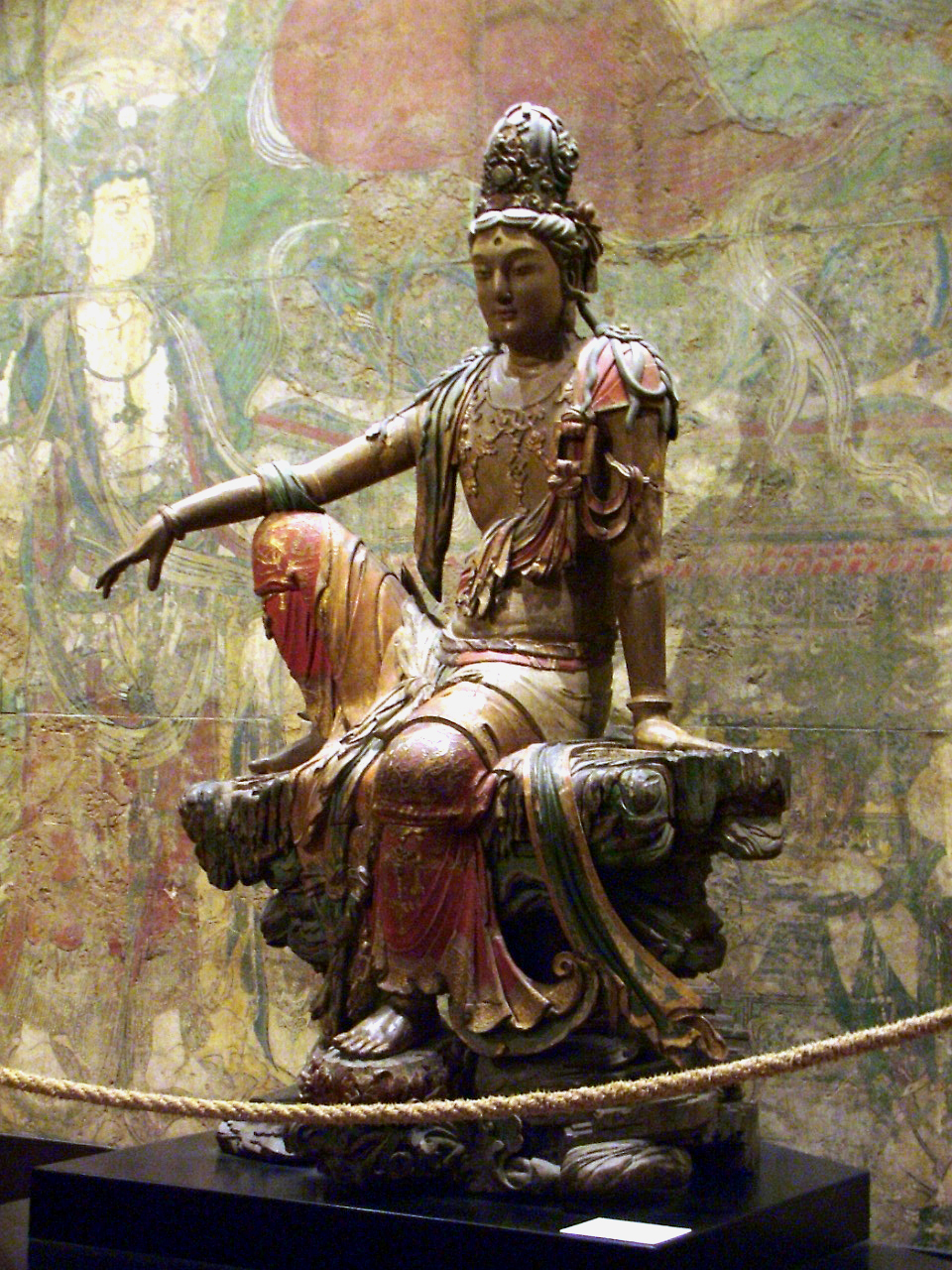
Liao dynasty (AD 907–1125) Chinese statue of the Guanyin Of The Southern Seas; Shanxi Province, China; 11th/12th century AD; Polychromed Wood – Wood with multiple layers of paint, H : 241.3 x L : 165.1 cm.; Nelson-Atkins Museum Collection; Kansas City, Missouri.

Due to the devotional popularity of Guanyin in Asia, she is known by many names, most of which are simply the localised pronunciations of "Guanyin" or "Guanshiyin":

- The name is pronounced G(w)ūn Yām (Yale: g(w)un1 yam1, Jyutping: g(w)un1 jam1) in Cantonese, also encountered as Kwun Yam in Hong Kong or Kun Iam in Macau.
- In Hokkien, she is called Kuan Im (POJ: Koan-im) or Kuan Se Im (POJ: Koan-sè-im)
- In Teochew, she is called Kuang Im
- In Malaysian Mandarin, the name is Guanyin Pusa (Guanyin Bodhisattva), Guan Shi Yin Pusa (Guanyin Bodhisattva).
- In Tibetan, the name is Chenrézik (སྤྱན་རས་གཟིགས).
- In Vietnamese, the name is Quan Âm, Quan Thế Âm or Quán Tự Tại.
- In Japanese, Guanyin is pronounced Kannon (観音), occasionally Kan'on, or more formally Kanzeon (観世音, the same characters as Guanshiyin); the spelling Kwannon, based on a premodern pronunciation, is sometimes seen. This rendition was used for an earlier spelling of the well-known camera manufacturer Canon Inc., which was named for Guanyin.
- In Korean, Guanyin is called Gwan-eum (Korean: 관음) or Gwanse-eum (Korean: 관세음).
- In Khmer, the name is Preah Mae Kun Si Im (ព្រះម៉ែ គង់សុីអុិម, "Goddess Mother Si Im") or Preah Neang Kun Si Im (ព្រះនាង គង់សុីអុិម, "Goddess Princess Si Im"). Her full name is always used. When referring to her more than once, the name can be shortened down to her title, Preah Mae (Goddess Mother).
- In Thai the pronunciation is a duplicate from Teochew Kuang Im (กวนอิม), Phra Mae Kuan Im (พระแม่กวนอิม; Phra Mae means "goddess") or Chao Mae Kuan Im (Thai: เจ้าแม่กวนอิม; Chao Mae usually means "madam", but here, means "goddess").
- In Burmese, the name of Guanyin is Kwan Yin Medaw, literally meaning Mother Kwan Yin (Goddess Guanyin) (ကွမ်ယင်မယ်တော်).
- In Indonesian, the name is Kwan Im or Dewi Kwan Im. She is also called Mak Kwan Im "Mother Guanyin".
- In Sinhala, the name is Natha Deviyo (නාථ දෙවියෝ).
- In Hmong, the name is Kab Yeeb.
- In Nepali, the name is Seto Machindranath (White Fish Lord) due to his association with the Hindu saint Matsendranatha. He is also known as Janabaha Dyo (Deity of Jana Bahal) as that is the site of the main temple.

In these same countries, the variant Guanzizai "Lord of Contemplation" and its equivalents are also used, such as in the Heart Sutra, among other sources.

== Depiction ==
=== Lotus Sūtra ===
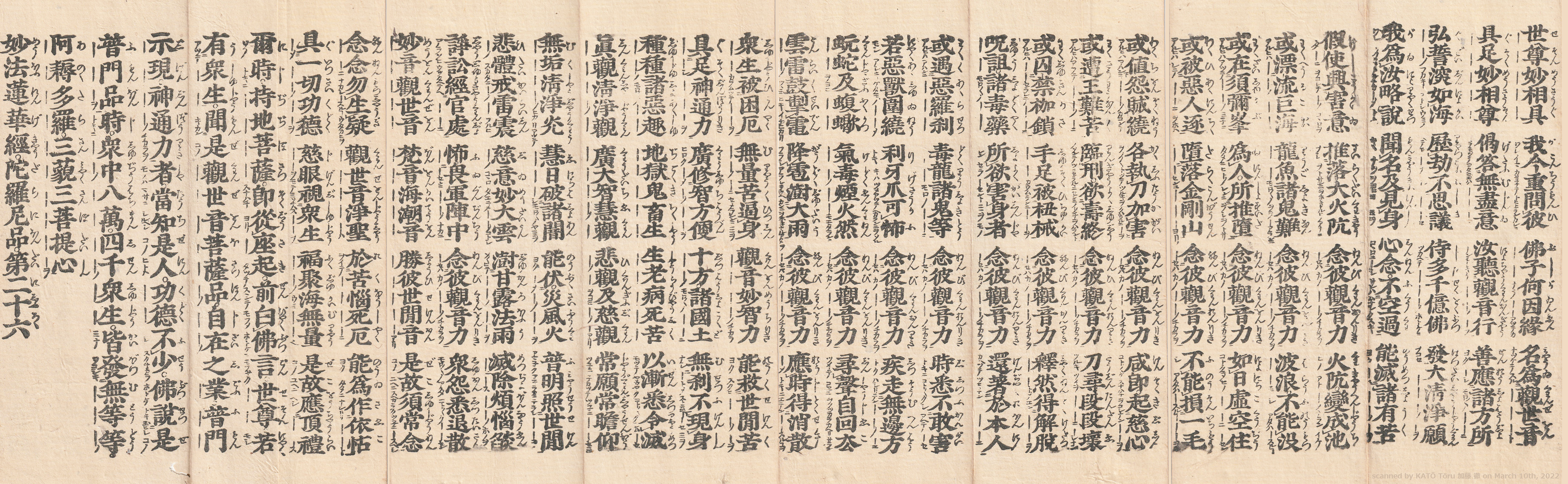
Chapter 25: The Universal Gateway of Avalokiteśvara Bodhisattva (Published in Edo period).

The Lotus Sūtra (Sanskrit Saddharma Puṇḍarīka Sūtra) is generally accepted to be the earliest literature teaching about the doctrines of Avalokiteśvara. These are found in the twenty fifth chapter of the Lotus Sūtra. This chapter is devoted to Avalokitesvara, describing him as a compassionate bodhisattva who hears the cries of sentient beings, and who works tirelessly to help those who call upon his name.

The Buddha answered Bodhisattva Akṣayamati, saying: "O son of a virtuous family! If innumerable hundreds of thousands of myriads of koṭis of sentient beings who experience suffering hear of Bodhisattva Avalokiteśvara and wholeheartedly chant his name, Bodhisattva Avalokiteśvara will immediately perceive their voices and free them from their suffering"

— The Lotus Sutra

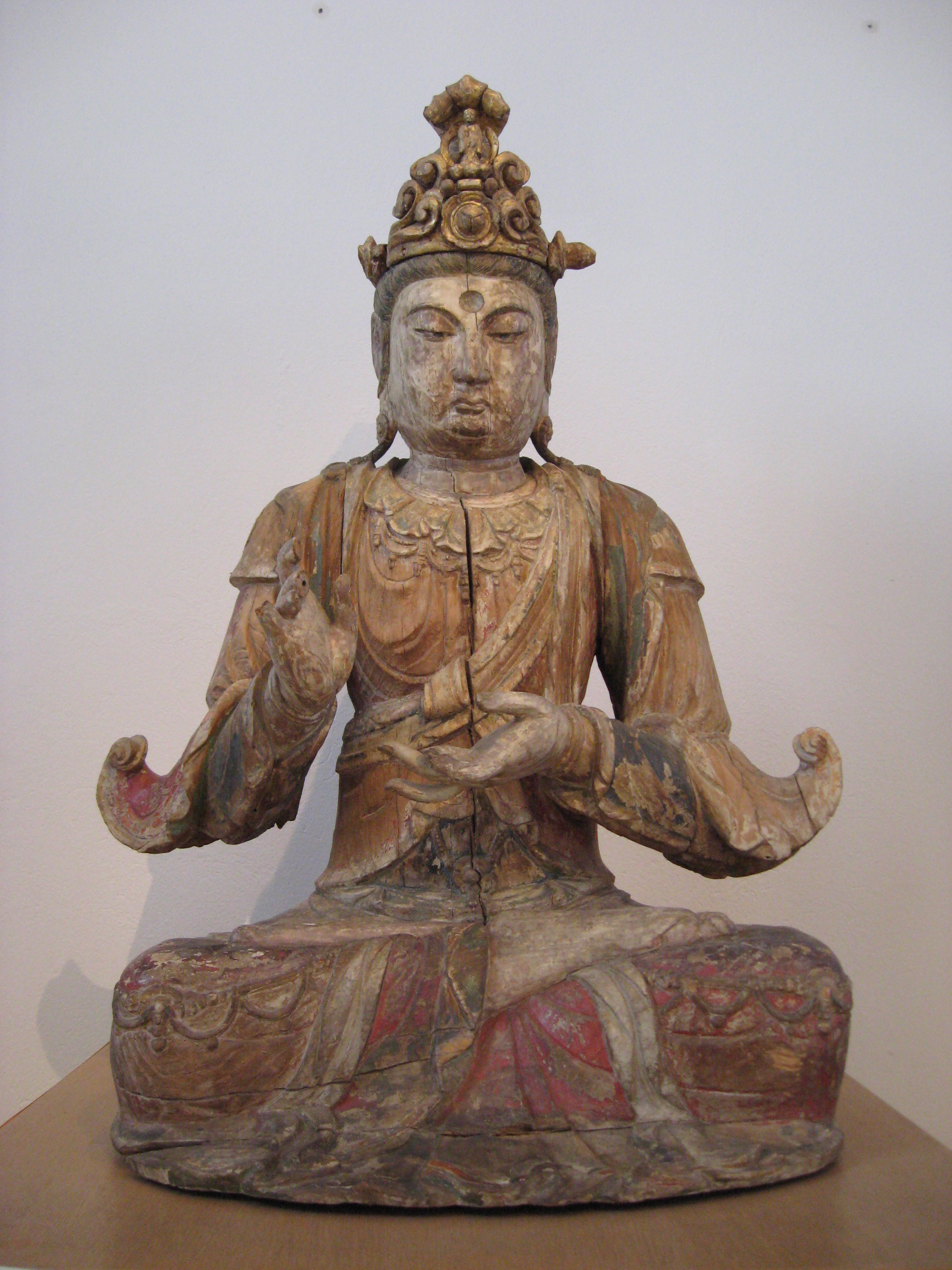
Guanyin Bodhisattva, sitting in the lotus position, the damaged hands probably performing dharmacakramudra, a gesture that signifies the moment when Buddha put the wheel of learning in motion; painted and gilded wood, China, Song/Jin period, late 13th century.

The Lotus Sutra describes Avalokiteśvara as a Bodhisattva who can take the form of any type of god including Indra or Brahma; any type of Buddha, any type of king or Chakravartin or even any kind of Heavenly Guardian including Vajrapani and Vaisravana as well as any gender male or female, adult or child, human or non-human being, in order to teach the Dharma to sentient beings. Local traditions in China and other East Asian countries have added many distinctive characteristics and legends to Guanyin c.q. Avalokiteśvara. Avalokiteśvara was originally depicted as a male Bodhisattva, and therefore wears chest-revealing clothing and may even sport a light moustache. Although this depiction still exists in the Far East, Guanyin is more often depicted as a woman in modern times. Additionally, some people believe that Guanyin is androgynous or perhaps without gender.

A total of 33 different manifestations of Avalokitasvara are described, including female manifestations, all to suit the minds of various beings. Chapter 25 consists of both a prose and a verse section. This earliest source often circulates separately as its own sūtra, called the Avalokitasvara Sūtra (Ch. 觀世音經), and is commonly recited or chanted at Buddhist temples in East Asia. The Lotus Sutra and its thirty-three manifestations of Guanyin, of which seven are female manifestations, is known to have been very popular in Chinese Buddhism as early as in the Sui and Tang dynasties. Additionally, Tan Chung notes that according to the doctrines of the Mahāyāna sūtras themselves, it does not matter whether Guanyin is male, female, or genderless, as the ultimate reality is in emptiness (Skt. śūnyatā).

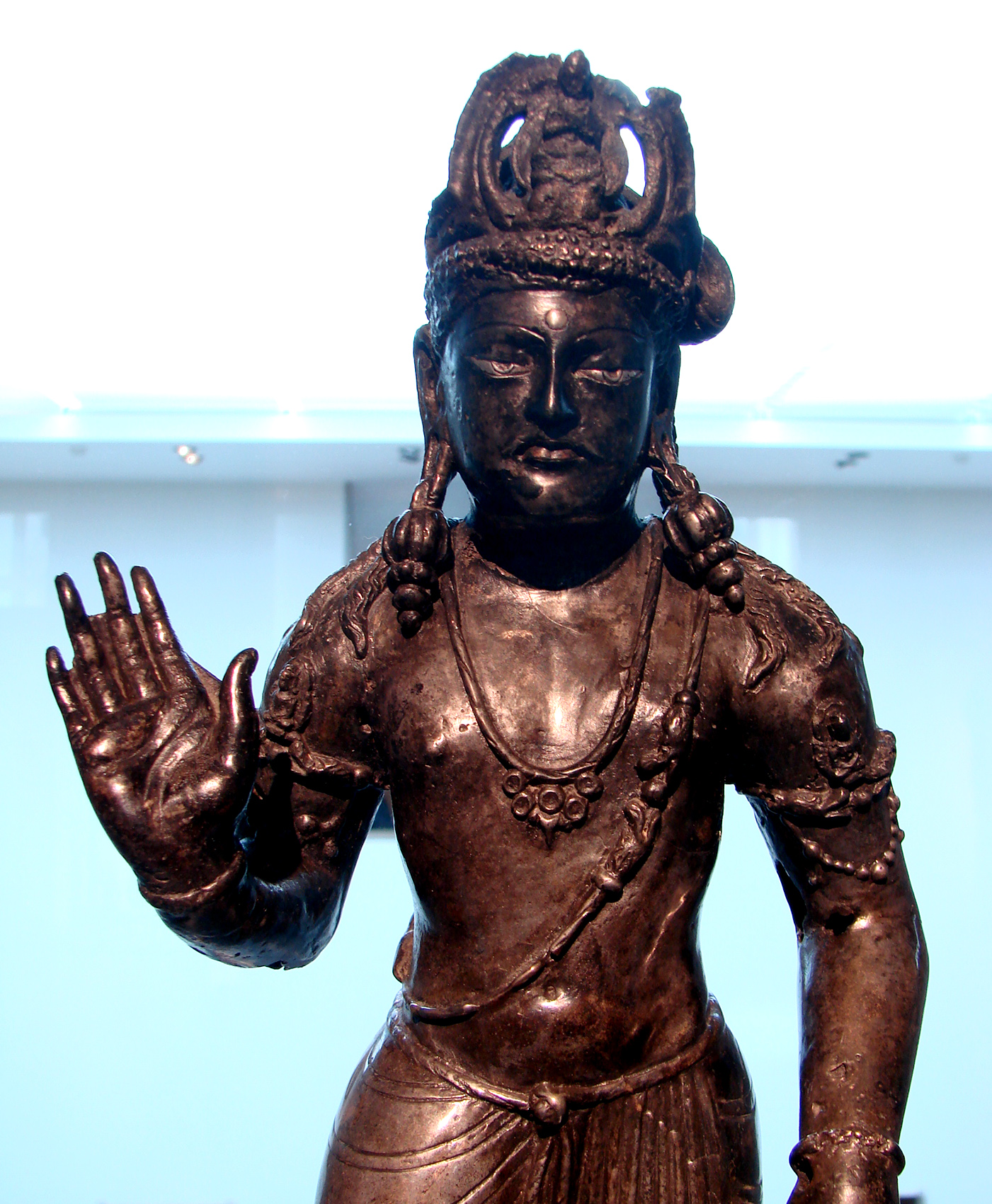
Early Indian statue of Avalokitaśvara Bodhisattva; Gandhāra, 3rd century.

=== Iconography ===
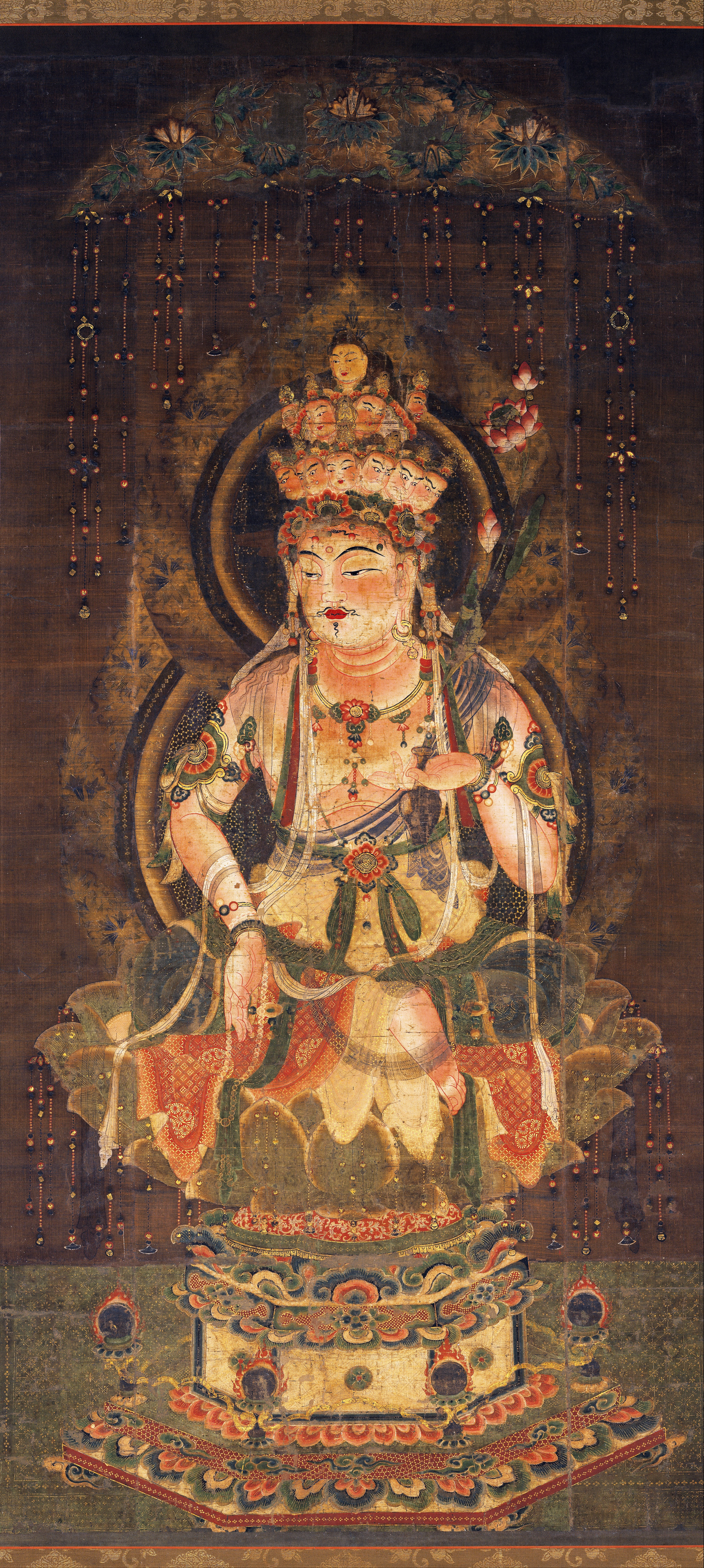
Kannon as a male bodhisattva. Eleven faced Ekādaśamukha form. Japan, 12th century.

Representations of the Bodhisattva in China prior to the Song dynasty (960–1279) were masculine in appearance. Images which later displayed attributes of both genders are believed to be in accordance with the Lotus Sutra, where Avalokitesvara has the supernatural power of assuming any form required to relieve suffering, and also has the power to grant children. Because this Bodhisattva is considered the personification of compassion and kindness, a mother goddess and patron of mothers and seamen, the representation in China was further interpreted in an all-female form around the 12th century. On occasion, Guanyin is also depicted holding an infant in order to further stress the relationship between the Bodhisattva, maternity, and birth. In the modern period, Guanyin is most often represented as a beautiful, white-robed woman, a depiction which derives from the earlier Pandaravasini form.

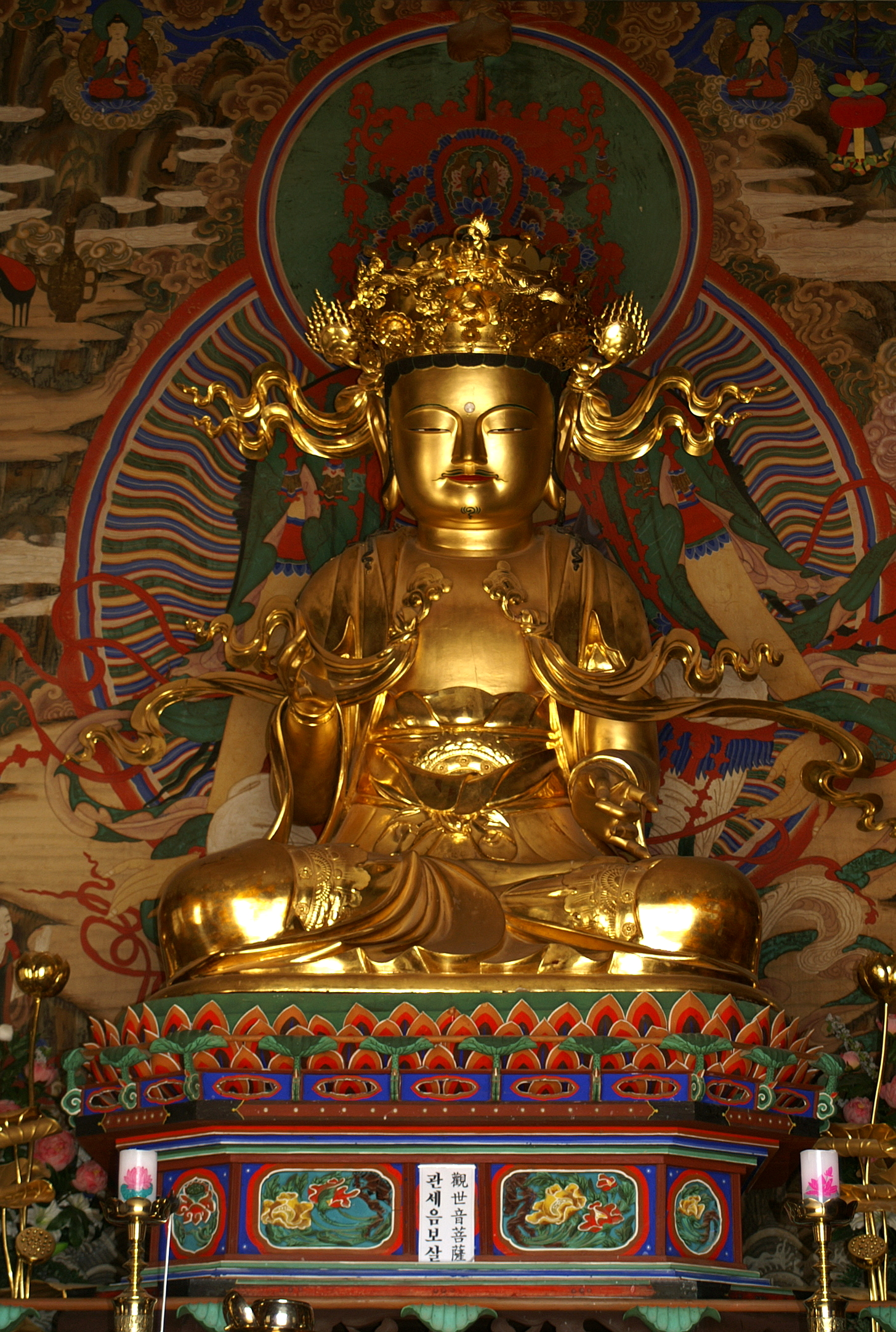
Joseon dynasty (1392–1897) statue of Gwaneum at Beopjusa in Boeun County, North Chungcheong, South Korea. Carved in 1655.

In some Buddhist temples and monasteries, Guanyin's image is occasionally that of a young man dressed in Northern Song Buddhist robes and seated gracefully. He is usually depicted looking or glancing down, symbolising that Guanyin continues to watch over the world.

In China, Guanyin is generally portrayed as a young woman wearing a flowing white robe, and usually also necklaces symbolic of Indian or Chinese royalty. In her left hand is a jar containing pure water, and the right holds a willow branch. The crown usually depicts the image of Amitābha.

There are also regional variations of Guanyin depictions. In Fujian, for example, a popular depiction of Guanyin is as a maiden dressed in Tang hanfu carrying a fish basket. A popular image of Guanyin as both Guanyin of the South Sea and Guanyin with a Fish Basket can be seen in late 16th-century Chinese encyclopedias and in prints that accompany the novel Golden Lotus.

In Chinese art, Guanyin is often depicted either alone, standing atop a dragon, accompanied by a white cockatoo and flanked by two children or two warriors. The two children are her acolytes who came to her when she was meditating at Mount Putuo. The girl is called Longnü and the boy Shancai. The two warriors are the historical general Guan Yu from the late Han dynasty (deified and regarded as the Buddhist protector deity Qielan) and the deva Weituo (who is sometimes referred to as a Bodhisattva). The Buddhist tradition also displays Guanyin, or other Buddhas and Bodhisattvas, flanked with the above-mentioned warriors, but as Bodhisattvas who protect the temple and the faith itself. In Pure Land Buddhist traditions, Guanyin is often depicted and venerated with the Buddha Amitabha and the Bodhisattva Mahasthamaprapta as part of a trio collective called the "Three Noble Ones of the West" (Chinese: 西方三聖; Pinyin: Xīfāng sānshèng).

Chinese Iconography of Guanyin
Element	Notes
CLOTHING
White robes	Influenced by tantric sutras and mandalas such as the Mandala of the Two Realms which frequently depict Guanyin as being clad in white.
Robes sometimes loose or open at chest	Recalling Guanyin's androgynous origins as a male Bodhisattva and her ability to change forms. If drawn androgynously, the breasts may, rarely, be wholly exposed, though sometimes jewels may be placed so as to cover the nipples. Very rarely, Guanyin may be shown unambiguously female with breasts fully exposed.
Necklace	
Crown	Usually contains an image of Buddha Amitabha, her teacher.
CARRYING
Vase, often in left hand, often upright though may be shown pouring water.	One of the Eight Symbols of Good Fortune. Contains pure water capable of relieving suffering. Sometimes when poured may form a bubble and surround a young child.
Willow branch, often in right hand, sometimes in the vase.	Used to sprinkle divine water. Willow bends without breaking. Influenced by tantric rites where willow branches were used in offering rituals to esoteric forms of Guanyin.
Fly whisk	
Lotus bloom	Common Buddhist symbol of purity.
Rice sheaths	Fertility, providing the necessities for life.
Basket, possibly a fish basket	Patroness of fishermen
Mālā	
ANIMALS AND PEOPLE
Infant	Specifically in the Songzi Guanyin manifestation (See below). Association with maternity. (See also Songzi Niangniang.) May be a representation of her disciple Hui'an / Muzha as an infant.
Qilin	Symbol of fertility and a wholly vegetarian creature dedicated strongly to avoiding harm, though will punish the wicked.
Dragon	Guanyin may be standing on the dragon which swims in the sea, showing her spiritual powers as well as her status of a patroness of fishermen. The dragon may also be flying and is shown surrounded by clouds.
Sea-turtle	Guanyin will be shown standing on the large turtle which swims in the sea as patroness of fishermen.
Shancai (Sanskrit: Sudhana)	Translated as "boy skilled in wealth". His presence in Guanyin's iconography was influenced by the Gaṇḍavyūha Sutra within the Avatamsaka Sutra which mention him as seeking out 53 spiritual masters in his quest for enlightenment, with Guanyin being the 28th master. Shancai may sometimes also be shown with bent legs to indicate his former status as crippled.
Longnü (Sanskrit: nāgakanyā)	Translated as "dragon girl". Is the daughter of a Dragon King. Her presence in Guanyin's iconography was influenced by tantric sutras celebrating the esoteric Amoghapāśa and Thousand-armed forms of Guanyin, which mention Longnü offering Guanyin a priceless pearl in gratitude for the latter visiting the Dragon King's palace at the bottom of the ocean to teach the inhabitants her salvific dharani.
Two warriors	Guan Yu and Weituo (Skanda), two dharmapalas who protect the Buddha-dharma.
White parrot	A faithful disciple, see below.
OTHER
Standing or seated on a large lotus bloom	A common posture for buddhas and boddhisattvas. The lotus bloom is commonly shown floating on the sea.
Halo	To indicate her sacredness or spiritual elevation.

In Chinese mythology, Guanyin (觀音) is the goddess of mercy and considered to be the physical embodiment of compassion. She is an all-seeing, all-hearing being who is called upon by worshipers in times of uncertainty, despair, and fear. Guanyin is originally based on the Bodhisattva Avalokiteśvara. Avalokiteśvara's myth spread throughout China during the advent of Buddhism and mixed with local folklore in a process known as syncretism to become the modern day understanding of Guanyin.

== Localization of Guanyin in East Asia ==
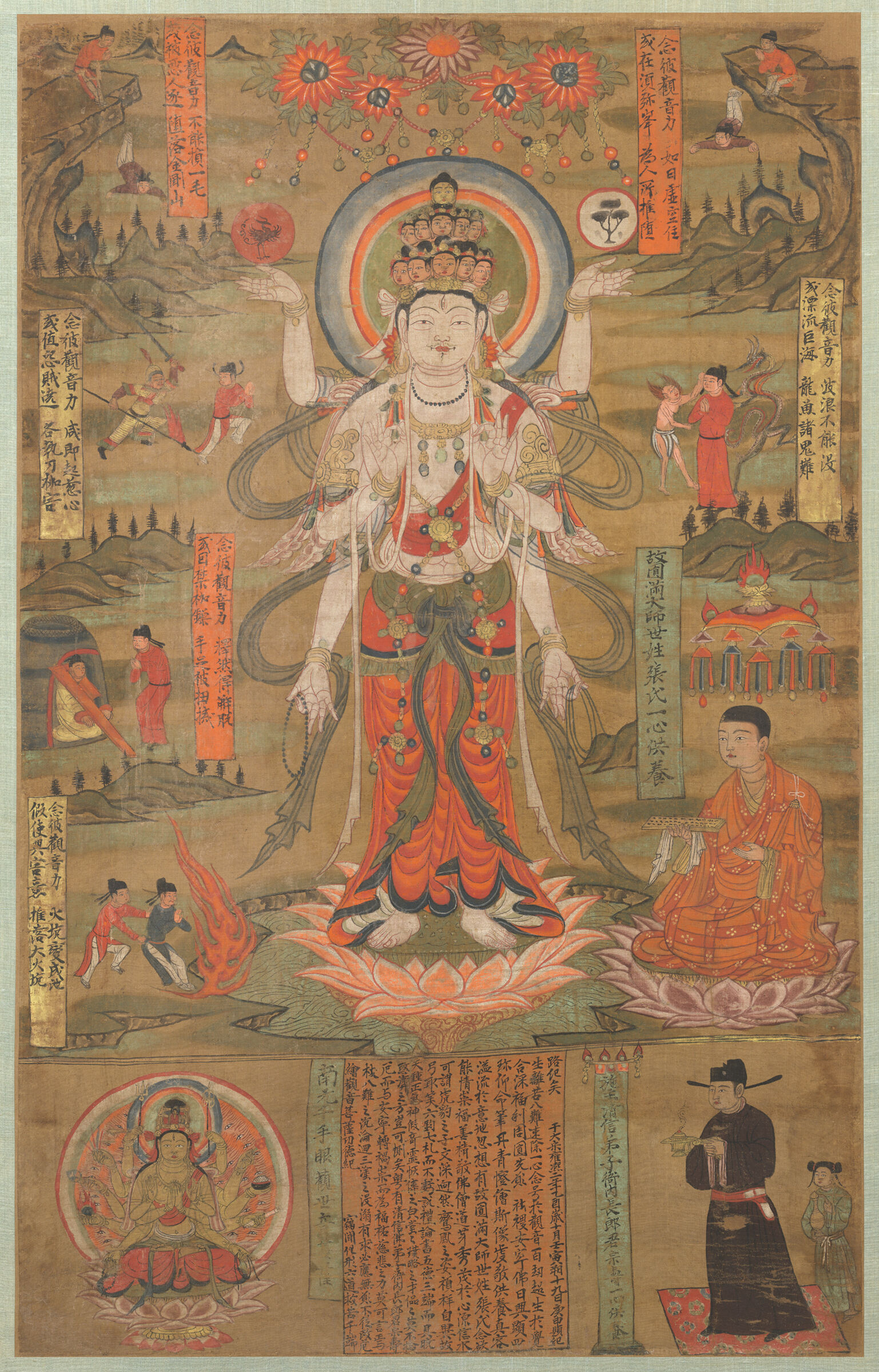
Song dynasty (960 - 1279) painting of Shiyimian Guanyin, or the Eleven Headed Guanyin, from Dunhuang in Gansu, China.

=== Manifestations of Guanyin ===
The twenty-fifth chapter of the Lotus Sutra, one of the most popular sacred texts in the Buddhist canon, describes thirty-three specific manifestations that Guanyin can assume to assist other beings seeking salvation. These forms encompass a Buddha, a pratyekabuddha, an arhat, King Brahma, Sakra (Indra), Isvara, Mahesvara (Shiva), a great heavenly general, Vaiśravaṇa, a Cakravartin, a minor king, an elder, a householder, a chief minister, a Brahmin, a bhikkhu, a bhikkhunī, a Upāsaka, a Upāsikā, a wife, a young boy, a young girl, a deva, a nāga, a yaksha, a gandharva, an asura, a garuḍa, a kinnara, a Mahoraga, a human, a non-human and Vajrapani.

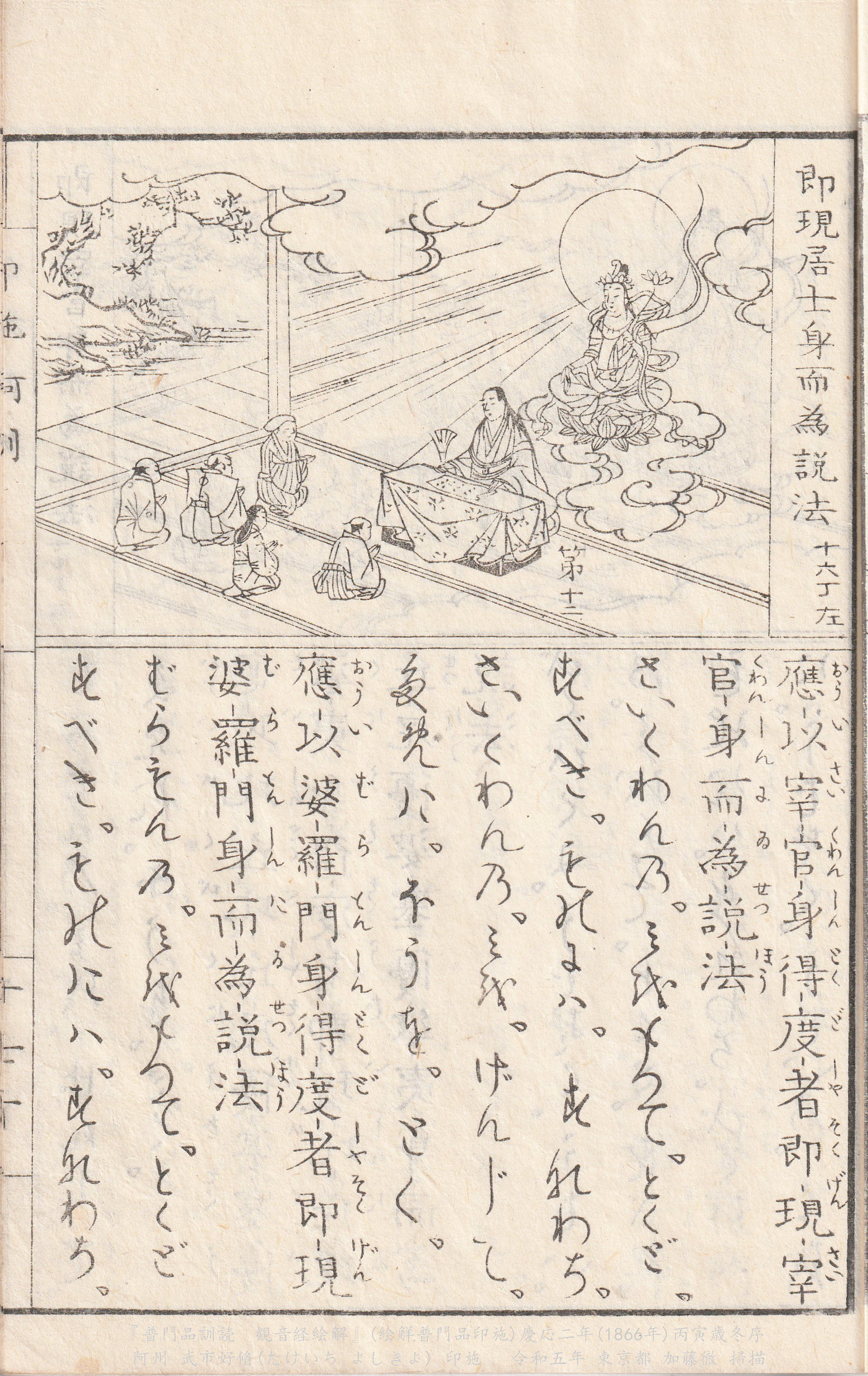
Householder

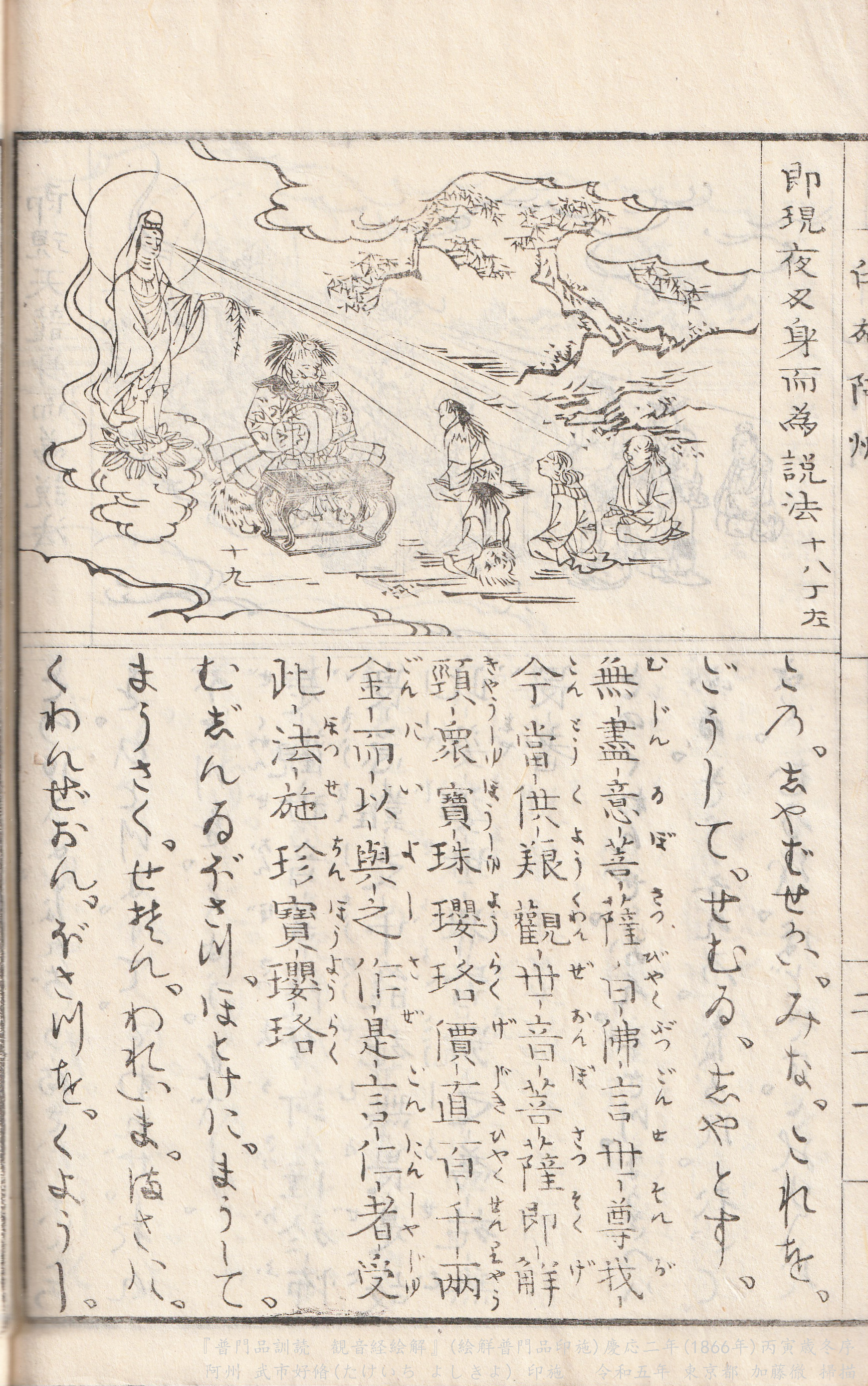
Yaksha

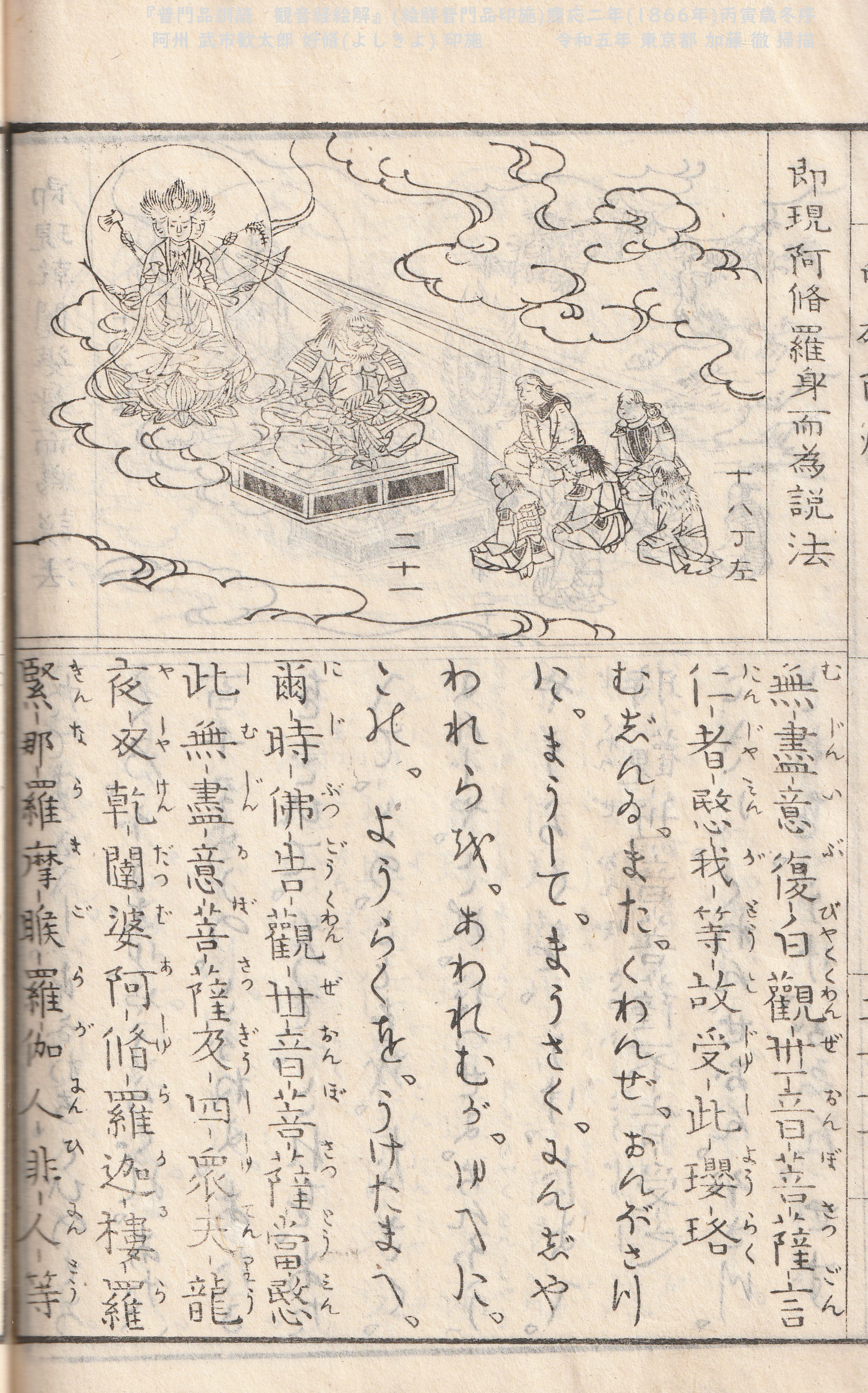
Asura

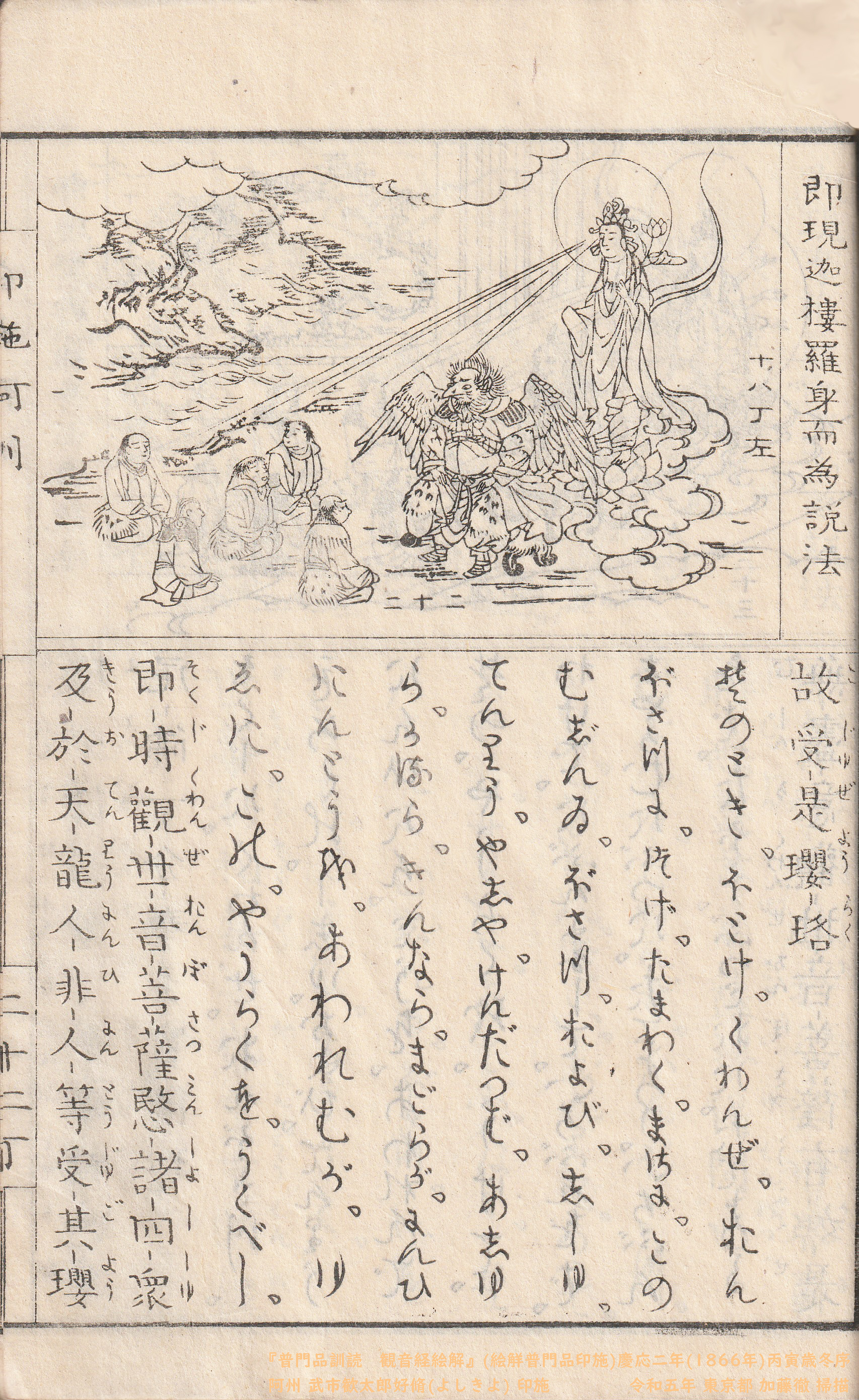
Garuḍa

The Śūraṅgama Sūtra also mentions thirty-two manifestations of Guanyin, which follow closely those in the Lotus Sutra, with the omission of Vajrapani, and the substitution of Vaiśravaṇa (Heavenly King of the North) with the Four Heavenly Kings. These manifestations of Guanyin have been nativized in China and Japan to form a traditional list of iconographic forms corresponding to each manifestation.

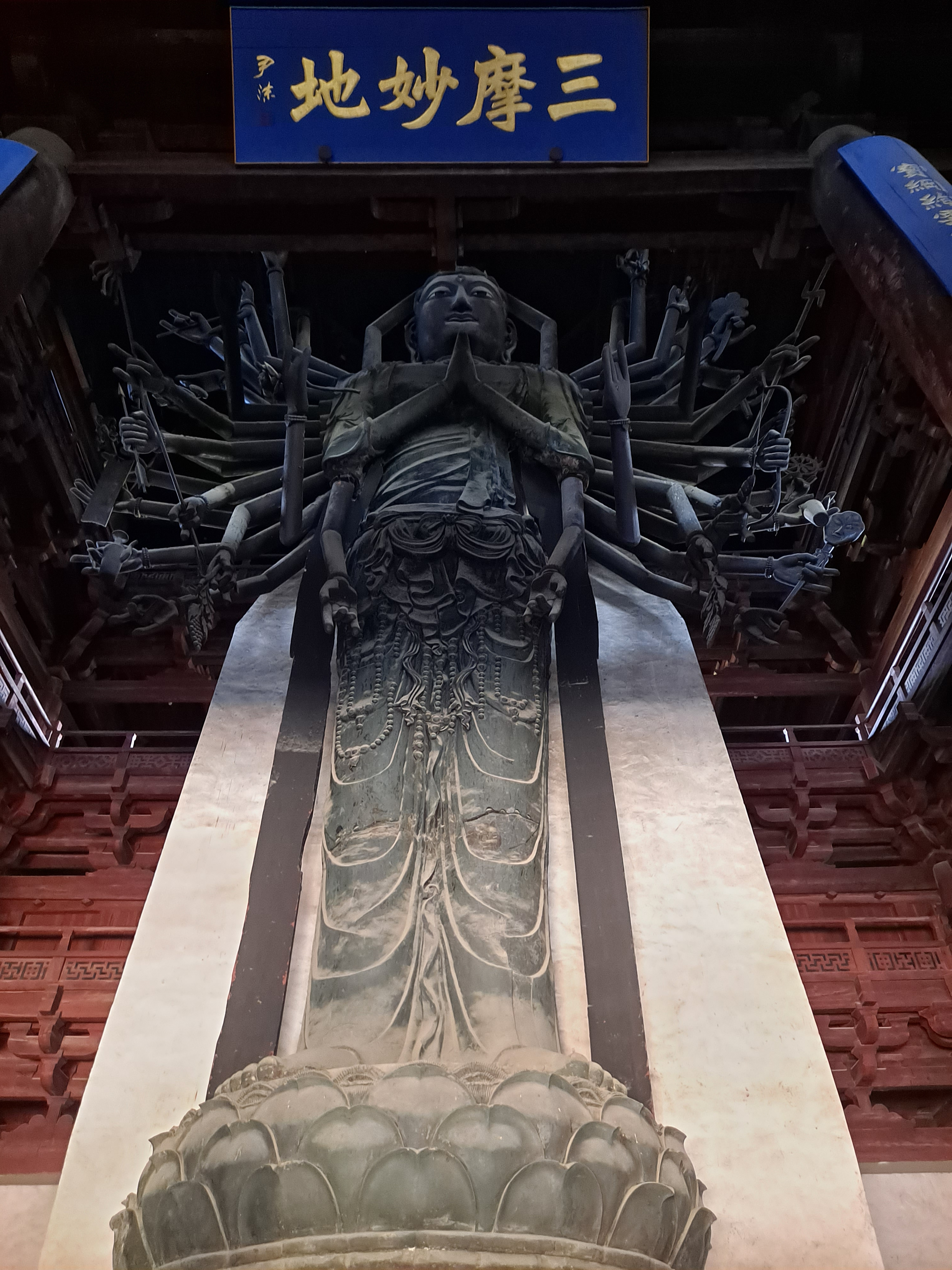
Colossal bronze Song dynasty (960 - 1279) statue of Qianshou Guanyin (Thousand-Armed Guanyin) located at the Guanyin dian of Longxing Temple in Hebei, China.

Guanyin is also venerated in various other forms. In the Chinese Tiantai and Tangmi and the Japanese Shingon and Tendai traditions, Guanyin can take on six forms, each corresponding to a particular realm of samsara. This grouping originates from the Mohe Zhiguan (Chinese: 摩訶止観; pinyin: Móhē Zhǐguān) written by the Tiantai patriarch Zhiyi (538–597) and are attested to in various other textual sources, such as the Essential Record of The Efficacy of The Three Jewels (Chinese: 三寶感應要略錄; pinyin: Sānbǎo Gǎnyìng Yàolüèlù). They are:

1. Guanyin as Great Mercy (Chinese: 大慈觀音; pinyin: Dàcí Guānyīn), also known as Noble Guanyin (Chinese: 聖觀音; pinyin: Shèng Guānyīn), who corresponds to the preta realm.
2. Guanyin as Great Compassion (Chinese: 大悲觀音; pinyin: Dàbēi Guānyīn), also known as Thousand-Armed Guanyin (Chinese: 千手觀音; pinyin: Qiānshǒu Guānyīn), who corresponds to the hell realm.
3. Guanyin of the Universally Shining Great Light (Chinese: 大光普照觀音; pinyin: Dàguāng Pǔzhào Guānyīn), also known as Eleven-Headed Guanyin (Chinese: 十一面觀音; pinyin: Shíyīmiàn Guānyīn), who corresponds to the asura realm.
4. Guanyin as The Divine Hero (Chinese: 天人丈夫觀音; pinyin: Tiānrén Zhàngfū Guānyīn), also known as Cundī Guanyin (Chinese: 準提觀音; pinyin: Zhǔntí Guānyīn), who corresponds to the human realm.
5. Guanyin as Mahābrahmā the Profound (Chinese: 大梵深遠觀音; pinyin: Dàfàn Shēnyuǎn Guānyīn), also known as Cintāmaṇicakra Guanyin (Chinese: 如意輪觀音; pinyin: Rúyìlún Guānyīn), who corresponds to the deva realm.
6. Fearless Lion-like Guanyin (Chinese: 獅子無畏觀音; pinyin: Shīzǐ Wúwèi Guānyīn), also known as Hayagriva Guanyin (Chinese: 馬頭觀音; pinyin: Mǎtóu Guānyīn), who corresponds to the animal realm.

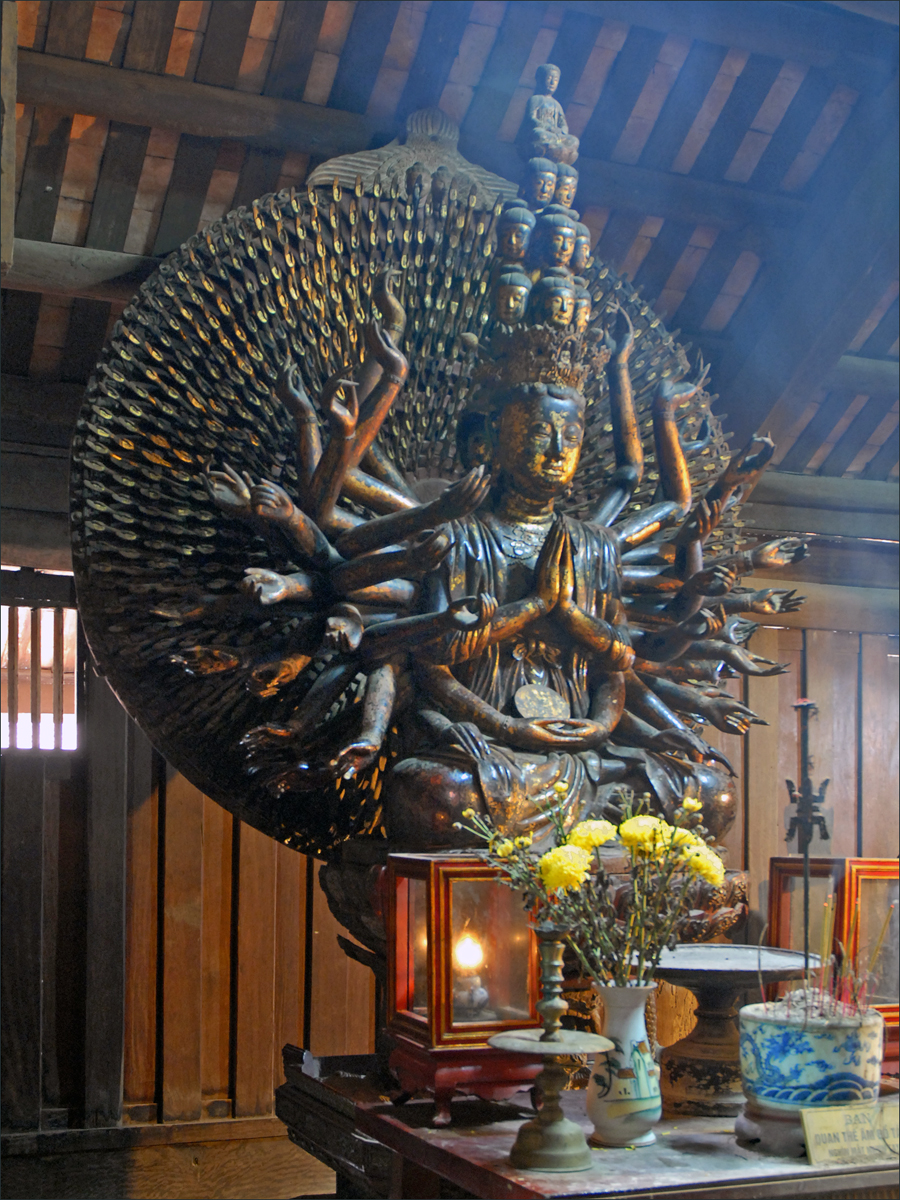
Wooden statue of Quan Âm Nghìn Mắt Nghìn Tay (Quan Âm Bodhisattva with One Thousand Arms and One Thousand Eyes), lacquered and gilded wood. Restored in 1656 CE. Bút Tháp Temple, Bắc Ninh Province, Vietnam.

In China, the Thousand-Armed manifestation of Guanyin is the most popular among her different esoteric forms. In the Karandavyuha Sutra, the Thousand-Armed and Thousand-Eyed Guanyin (Chinese: 千手千眼觀音; pinyin: Qiānshǒu Qiānyǎn Guānyīn) is described as being superior to all gods and buddhas of the Indian pantheon. The Sutra also states that "it is easier to count all the leaves of every tree of every forest and all the grains of sand in the universe than to count the blessings and power of Avalokiteshvara". This version of Guanyin with a thousand arms depicting the power of all gods also shows various buddhas in the crown depicting the wisdom of all buddhas. In temples and monasteries in China, iconographic depictions of this manifestation of Guanyin is often combined with iconographic depiction of her Eleven-Headed manifestation to form statues with a thousand arms as well as eleven heads. The mantra associated with this manifestation, the Nīlakaṇṭha Dhāraṇī, is one of the most popular mantras commonly recited in East Asian Buddhism. In Chinese Buddhism, the popularity of the mantra influenced the creation of a repentance ceremony known as the Dabei Chan (Chinese: 大悲懺; pinyin: Dàbēi chàn, lit: "Great Compassion Repentance") during the Song dynasty (960–1279) by the Tiantai monk Siming Zhili (Chinese: 四明知禮; pinyin: Sìmíng Zhīlǐ), which is still regularly performed in modern Chinese Buddhist temples in Mainland China, Hong Kong, Taiwan and overseas Chinese communities.

Colossal clay Liao dynasty (916 - 1125) statue of Shiyimian Guanyin, or the Eleven Headed Guanyin, in Dule Temple, Tianjin, China. The two smaller statues on both side of the main Guanyin statue features Bodhisattvas wearing crowns depicting the Five Tathāgatas.

One Chinese Buddhist legend from the Complete Tale of Guanyin and the Southern Seas (Chinese: 南海觀音全撰; pinyin: Nánhǎi Guānyīn Quánzhuàn) recounts how Guanyin almost emptied hell by reforming almost all of its denizens until sent out from there by the Ten Kings. Despite strenuous effort, she realised that there were still many unhappy beings yet to be saved. After struggling to comprehend the needs of so many, her head split into eleven pieces. The buddha Amitābha, upon seeing her plight, gave her eleven heads to help her hear the cries of those who are suffering. Upon hearing these cries and comprehending them, Avalokiteśvara attempted to reach out to all those who needed aid, but found that her two arms shattered into pieces. Once more, Amitābha came to her aid and appointed her a thousand arms to let her reach out to those in need. Many Himalayan versions of the tale include eight arms with which Avalokitesvara skillfully upholds the dharma, each possessing its own particular implement, while more Chinese-specific versions give varying accounts of this number. In Japan, statues of this nature can be found at the Sanjūsangen-dō temple of Kyoto.

In both Chinese Buddhism and Japanese Buddhism, Hayagriva Guanyin (lit. 'Horse Headed Guanyin') is venerated as a guardian protector of travel and transportation, especially for cars. His statue is placed at the entrance and exits of some Chinese Buddhist temples to bless visitors. In certain Chinese Buddhist temples, visitors are also allowed to have their license plates enshrined in front of an image of this deity to invoke his protection over their vehicle. He is also counted as one of the 500 Arhats, where he is known as Mǎtóu Zūnzhě 馬頭尊者 (lit. 'The Venerable Horse Head'). In Taoism, Hayagriva Guanyin was syncretized and incorporated within the Taoist pantheon as the god Mǎ Wáng 馬王 (lit. Horse King), who is associated with fire. In this form, he is usually portrayed with six arms and a third eye on the forehead.

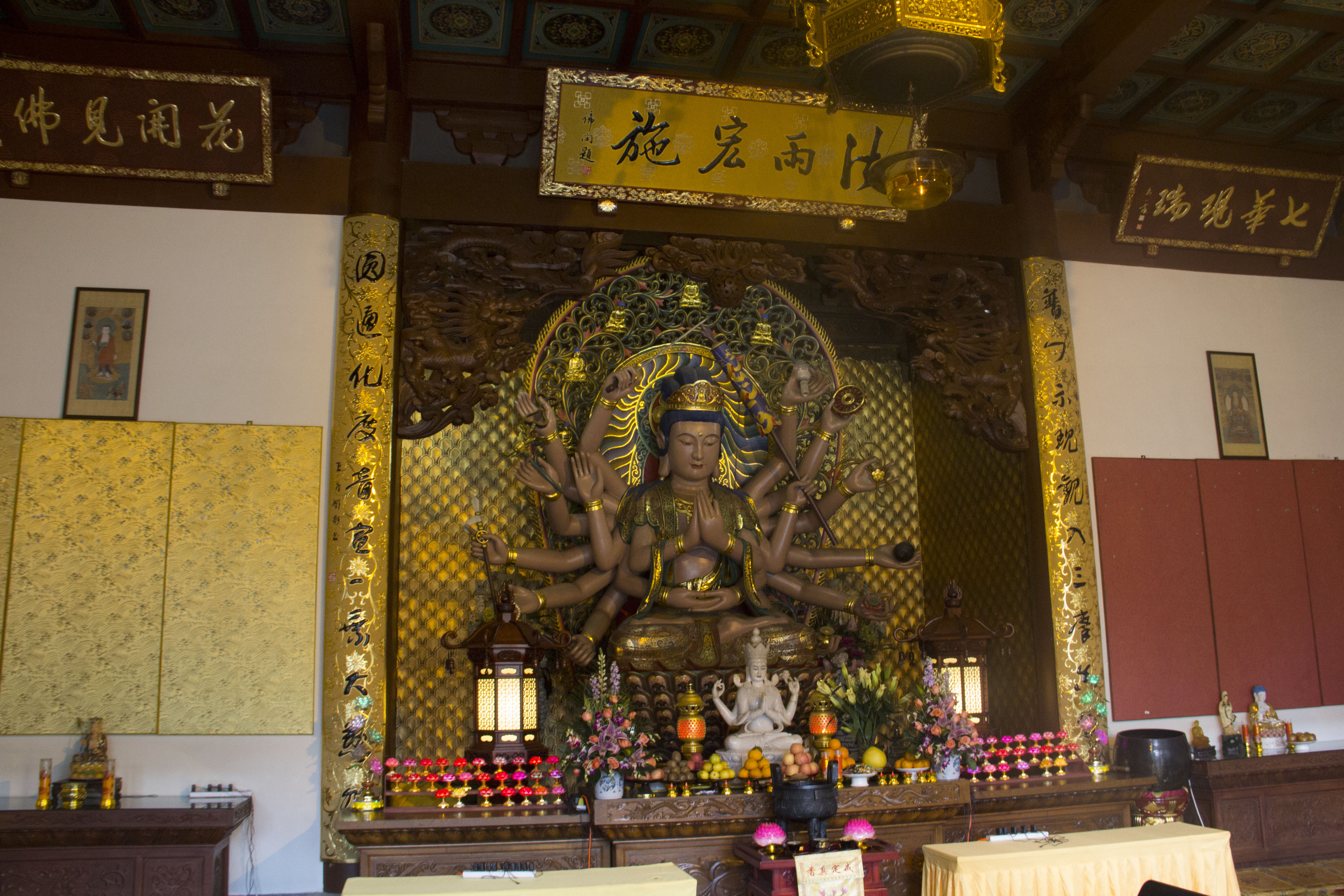
Statue of Cundī Guanyin (Zhunti Guanyin) with 18 arms from the Mahavira Hall of Lingyin Temple in Hangzhou, Zhejiang, China.

Guanyin's Cundī manifestation is an esoteric form of Guanyin that is venerated widely in China and Japan. The first textual source of Cundī and the Cundī Dhāraṇī is the Kāraṇḍavyūhasūtra, a sūtra centered around the Bodhisattva Avalokiteśvara that introduced the popular mantra oṃ maṇipadme hūṃ. This text is first dated to around the late 4th century CE to the early 5th century CE. Cundī and the Cundī Dhāraṇī are also featured in the Cundī Dhāraṇī Sūtra, which was translated three times from Sanskrit into Chinese in the late 7th century and early 8th century by the Indian esoteric masters Divākara (685 CE), Vajrabodhi (723 CE), and Amoghavajra (8th century). In iconographic form, she is depicted with eighteen arms, all wielding different implements and weaponry that symbolize skillful means of the Dharma, sitting on a lotus flower. This manifestation is also referred to as the "Mother of the Seventy Million [Buddhas]" (Chinese: 七俱胝佛母; pinyin: Qījùzhī fómǔ). Her mantra, the Mahācundi Dhāraṇī (Chinese: 準提神咒; pinyin: Zhǔntí Shénzhòu), is one of the Ten Small Mantras (Chinese: 十小咒; pinyin: Shí xiǎo zhòu), which is a collection of dharanis that are commonly recited in most Chinese Buddhist temples during morning liturgical services.

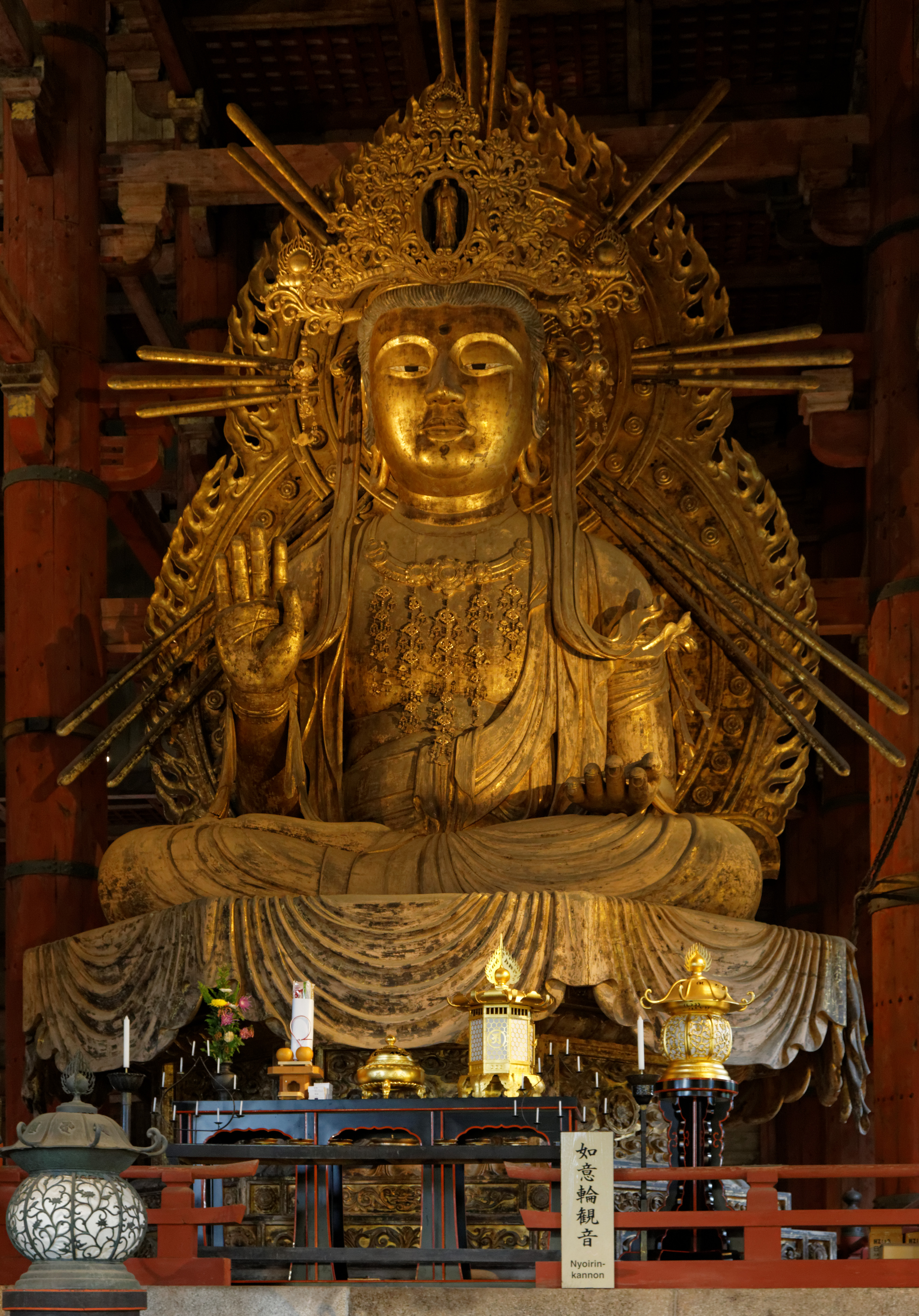
Edo period (1600–1868) statue of Nyoirin Kannon, or Cintāmaṇicakra Guanyin, at the kondō of Tōdai-ji in Nara, Nara, Japan. Carved in 1738.

Guanyin's Cintāmaṇicakra manifestation is also widely venerated in China and Japan. In iconographic form, this manifestation is often portrayed as having six arms, with his first right hand touches the cheek in a pensive mudra, his second right hand holds a wish granting jewel (cintamani), his third right hand holds prayer beads, his first left hand holds Mount Meru, his second left hand holds a lotus flower and the third left hand holds a Dharma wheel (cakra). Her mantra, the Cintāmaṇicakra Dharani (Chinese: 如意寶輪王陀羅尼; pinyin: Rúyì Bǎolún Wáng Tuóluóní), is also one of the Ten Small Mantras.

Another common manifestation of Guanyin is the hungry ghost king Ulkāmukha Pretarāja, popularly known in Chinese as Mianran Dashi (Chinese: 面燃大士, pinyin: Miànrán Dàshì, lit: "Burning-Face Mahāsattva"). According to a sūtra, Ānanda, one of the Buddha's ten principal disciples, was once meditating in a forest at night when he encountered a ghost king named either Mianran (面燃, Miànrán, lit: "Burning Face") or Yankou (燄口, Yànkǒu, lit: "Flaming Mouth") that warned him about his impending death and rebirth in the realm of hungry ghosts which would happen unless he was able to give one measure of food and drink the size of a bushel used in Magadha to each of the one hundred thousand nayutas of hungry ghosts and other beings. The encounter prompted Ānanda to beg Śākyamuni Buddha for a way to avert his fate, at which point the Buddha revealed a ritual and a dhāraṇī that he had been taught in a past life when he was a Brahmin by the Bodhisattva Guanyin. According to the sūtra, the performance of the ritual would not only feed the hungry ghosts but would also ensure the longevity of the performing ritualist. The sūtra ends with Ānanda performing the rite according to the Buddha's instructions and avoiding the threat of rebirth into the realm of the hungry ghosts. Buddhist traditions hold that he eventually achieved longevity and attained the state of arhathood. Chinese Buddhist tradition regards the ghost king Mianran as an emanation of Guanyin herself, and suffixes his name with the title Dashi (Chinese: 大士, pinyin: Dàshì), meaning "Mahāsattva". The account in this sūtra forms the basis for most ghost-feeding rituals in East Asian Buddhist traditions, and an effigy or statue of Mianran Dashi is typically enshrined during certain Chinese ghost-feeding rituals in particular as well as during festivals like the Zhongyuan Festival. Other than ghost-feeding rites, the sūtra's account was also influential in the development of universal salvation ceremonies such as the Chinese Buddhist Shuilu Fahui and Korean Buddhist Suryukjae. A painting of Mianran Dashi is typically among the many shuilu ritual paintings enshrined during the Chinese Shuilu Fahui in particular.

In China, it is said that fishermen used to pray to her to ensure safe voyages. The titles Guanyin of the Southern Ocean (南海觀音) and "Guanyin (of/on) the Island" stem from this tradition.

=== Miaoshan ===
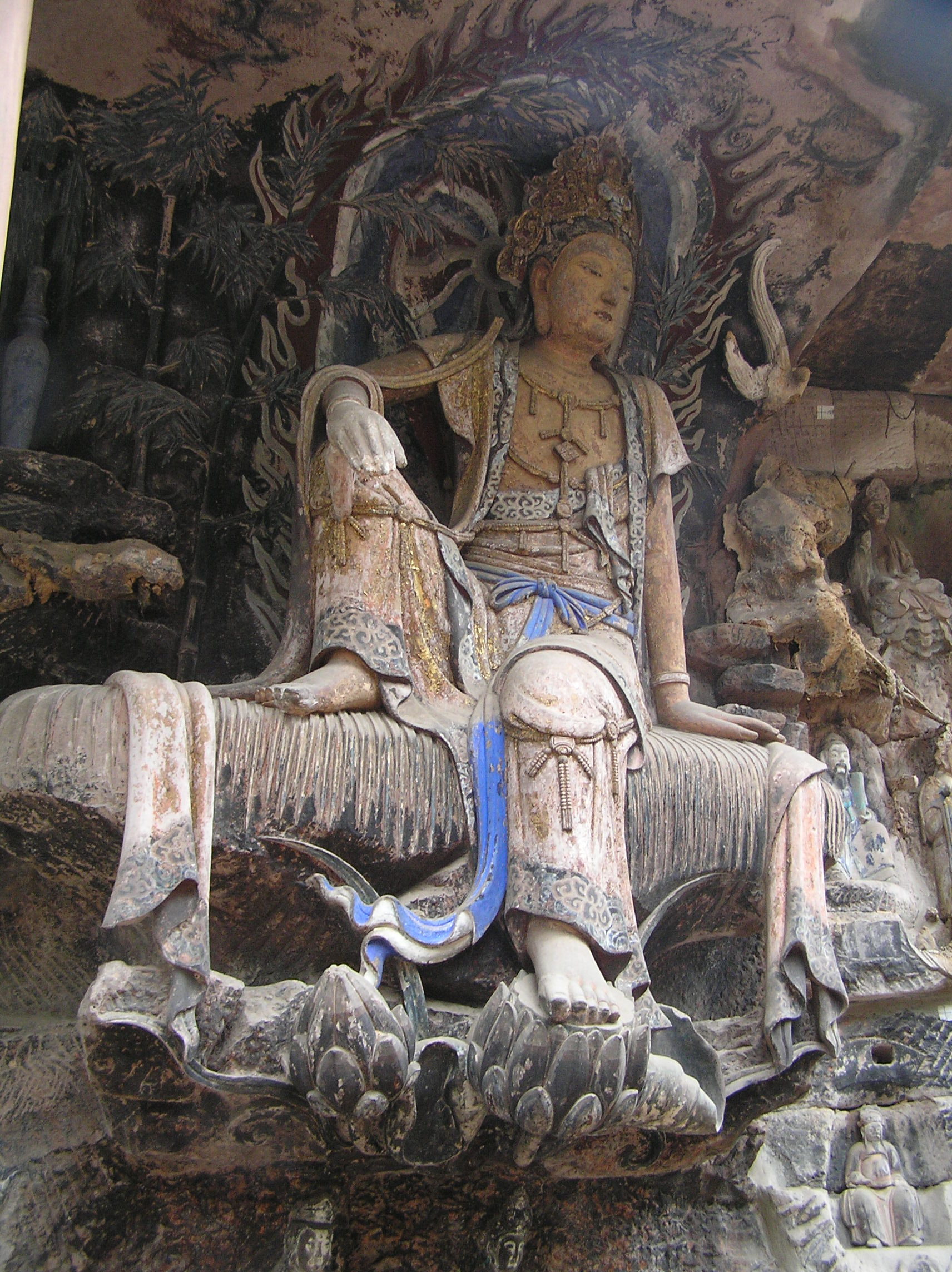
Song dynasty (960–1279) statue of Zizhu Guanyin, or Purple Bamboo Guanyin, carved some time between 936 and 944 at the Anyue Rock Carvings in Sichuan, China.

Another story from the Precious Scroll of Fragrant Mountain (香山寶卷) describes an incarnation of Guanyin as the daughter of a cruel king Miaozhuang Wang who wanted her to marry a wealthy but uncaring man. The story is usually ascribed to the research of the Buddhist monk Jiang Zhiqi during the 11th century. The story is likely to have its origin in Taoism. When Jiang penned the work, he believed that the Guanyin we know today was actually a princess called Miaoshan (妙善), who had a religious following on Fragrant Mountain. Despite this there are many variants of the story in Chinese mythology.

According to the story, after the king asked his daughter Miaoshan to marry the wealthy man, she told him that she would obey his command, so long as the marriage eased three misfortunes.

The king asked his daughter what were the three misfortunes that the marriage should ease. Miaoshan explained that the first misfortune the marriage should ease was the suffering people endure as they age. The second misfortune it should ease was the suffering people endure when they fall ill. The third misfortune it should ease was the suffering caused by death. If the marriage could not ease any of the above, then she would rather retire to a life of religion forever.

When her father asked who could ease all the above, Miaoshan pointed out that a doctor was able to do all of these. Her father grew angry as he wanted her to marry a person of power and wealth, not a healer. He forced her into hard labour and reduced her food and drink but this did not cause her to yield.

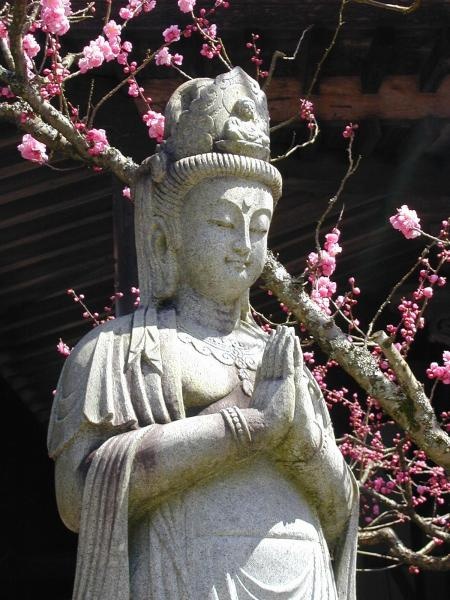
Kannon statue in Daien-in on Mount Kōya in Wakayama, Japan.

Every day she begged to be able to enter a temple and become a nun instead of marrying. Her father eventually allowed her to work in the temple, but asked the monks to give her the toughest chores in order to discourage her. The monks forced Miaoshan to work all day and all night while others slept in order to finish her work. However, she was such a good person that the animals living around the temple began to help her with her chores. Her father, seeing this, became so frustrated that he attempted to burn down the temple. Miaoshan put out the fire with her bare hands and suffered no burns. Now struck with fear, her father ordered her to be put to death.

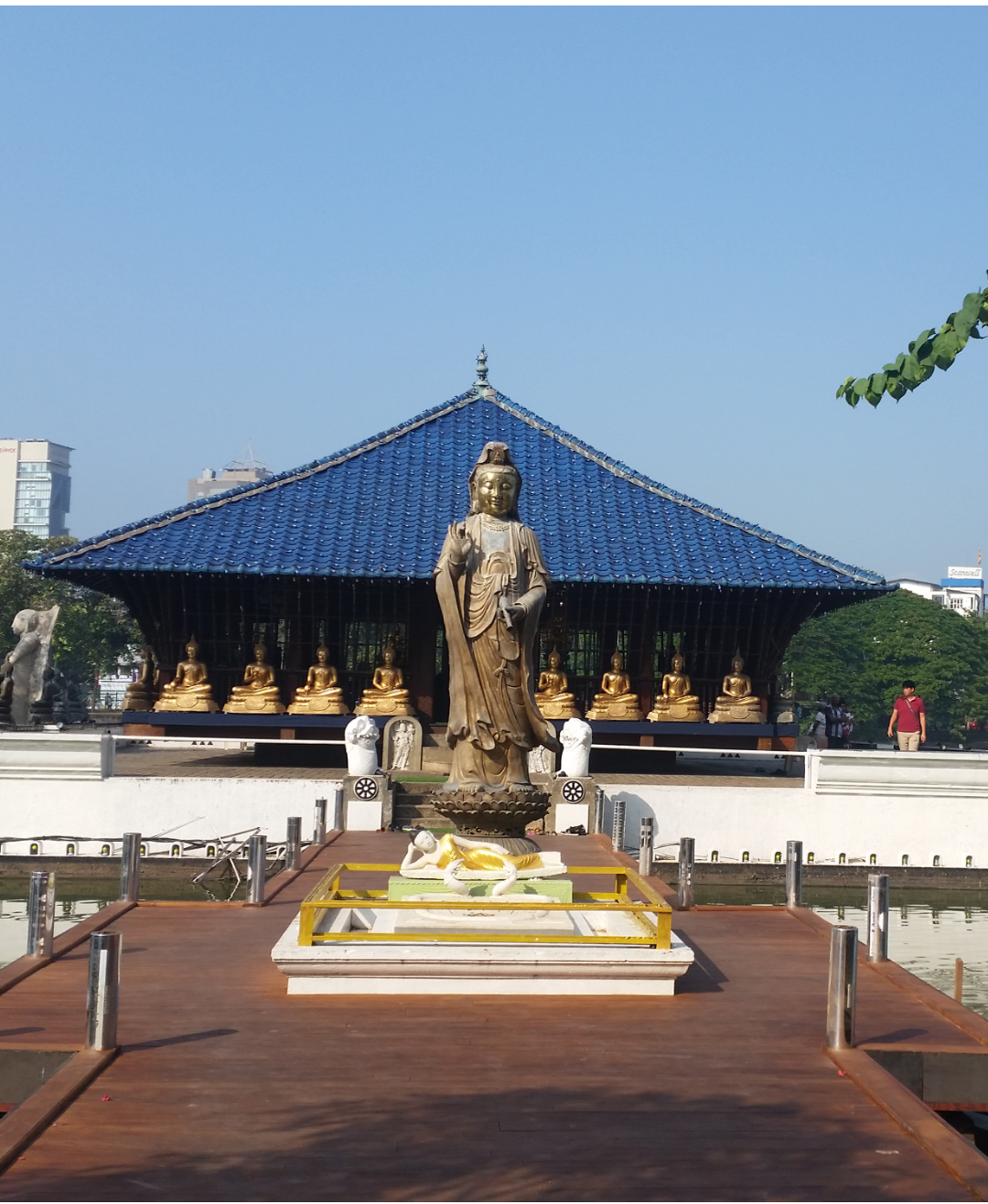
Guanyin statue at Seema Malaka in Colombo, Sri Lanka.

In one version of this legend, when Guanyin was executed, a supernatural tiger took her to one of the more hell-like realms of the dead. However, instead of being punished like the other spirits of the dead, Guanyin played music, and flowers blossomed around her. This completely surprised the hell guardian. The story says that Guanyin, by merely being in that Naraka (hell), turned it into a paradise.

A variant of the legend says that Miaoshan allowed herself to die at the hand of the executioner. According to this legend, as the executioner tried to carry out her father's orders, his axe shattered into a thousand pieces. He then tried a sword which likewise shattered. He tried to shoot Miaoshan down with arrows but they all veered off.

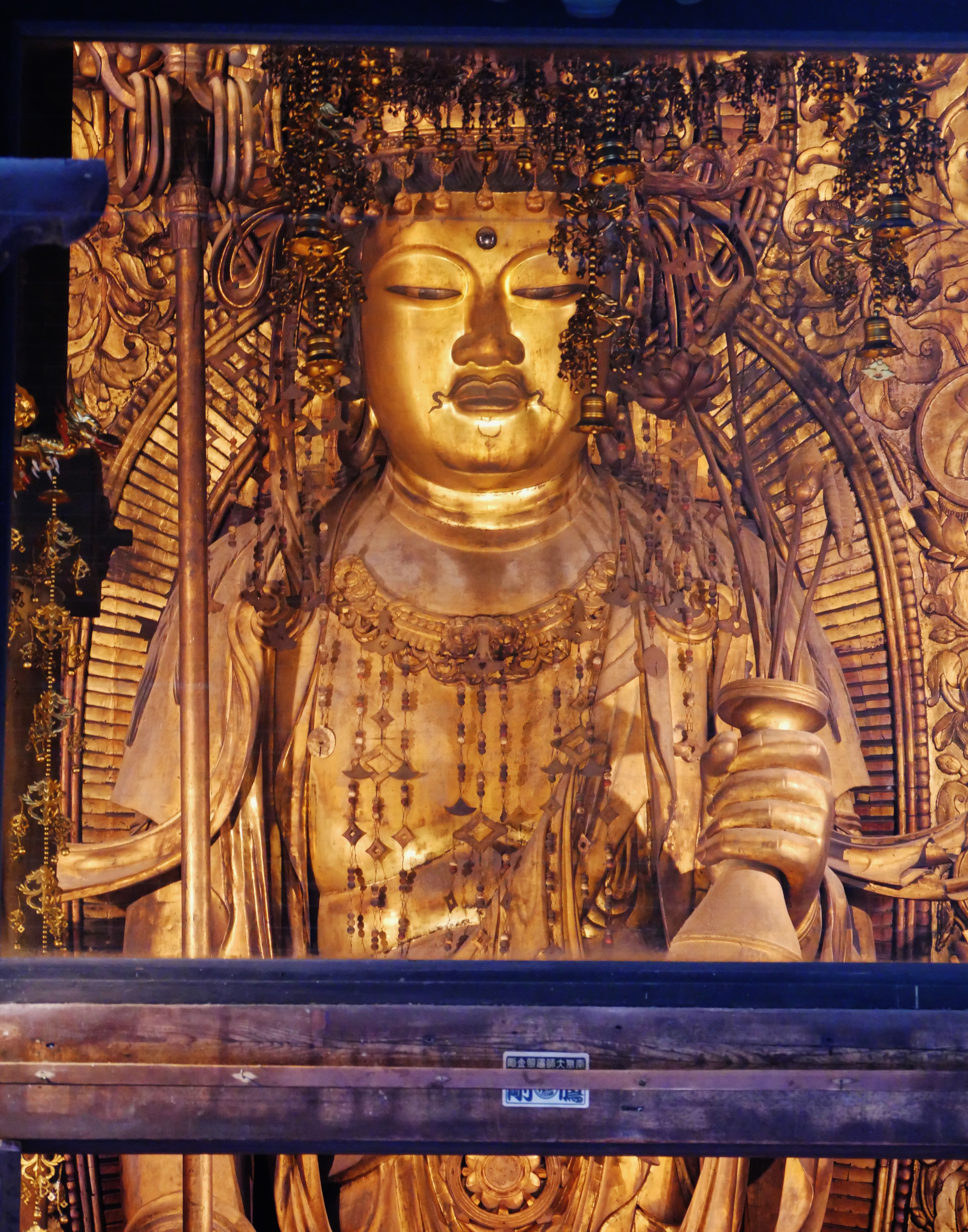
Muromachi period (1336 - 1573) statue of Jūichimen Kannon (Thousand-Armed Kannon) located at the hondō of Hasadera in Sakurai, Nara, Japan. Carved in 1538.

Finally in desperation he used his hands. Miaoshan, realising the fate that the executioner would meet at her father's hand should she fail to let herself die, forgave the executioner for attempting to kill her. It is said that she voluntarily took on the massive karmic guilt the executioner generated for killing her, thus leaving him guiltless. It is because of this that she descended into the Hell-like realms. While there, she witnessed first-hand the suffering and horrors that the beings there must endure, and was overwhelmed with grief. Filled with compassion, she released all the good karma she had accumulated through her many lifetimes, thus freeing many suffering souls back into Heaven and Earth. In the process, that Hell-like realm became a paradise. It is said that Yama, the ruler of hell, sent her back to Earth to prevent the utter destruction of his realm, and that upon her return she appeared on Fragrant Mountain.

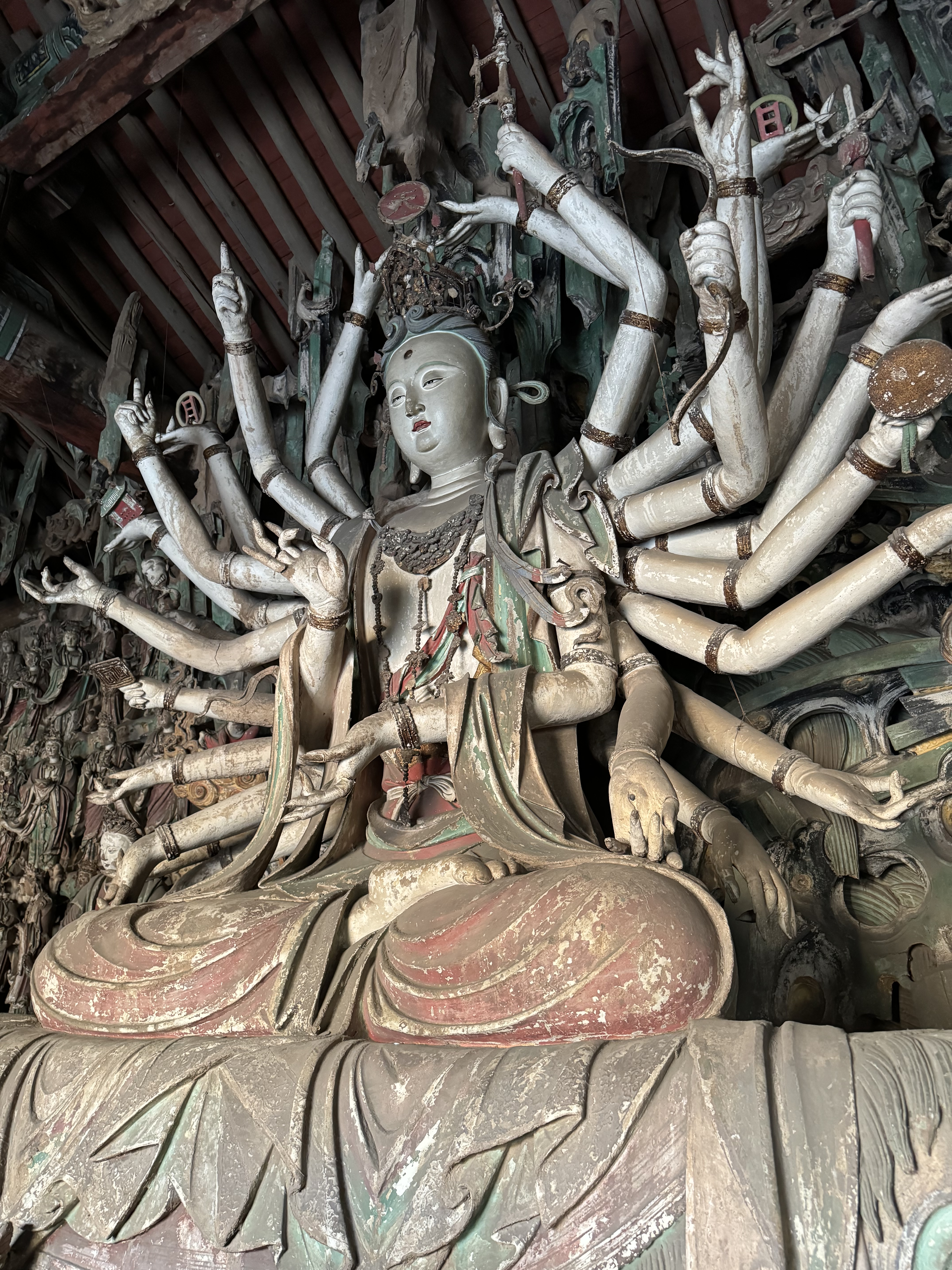
Ming dynasty statue of Guanyin with twenty-six arms at Shuanglin Temple in Shanxi, China.

Another tale says that Miaoshan never died, but was in fact transported by a supernatural tiger, believed to be the Deity of the Mountain, to Fragrant Mountain. The legend of Miaoshan usually ends with Miaozhuang Wang, Miaoshan's father, falling ill with jaundice. No physician was able to cure him. Then a monk appeared saying that the jaundice could be cured by making a medicine out of the arm and eye of one without anger. The monk further suggested that such a person could be found on Fragrant Mountain. When asked, Miaoshan willingly offered up her eyes and arms. Miaozhuang Wang was cured of his illness and went to the Fragrant Mountain to give thanks to the person. When he discovered that his own daughter had made the sacrifice, he begged for forgiveness. The story concludes with Miaoshan being transformed into the Thousand-Armed Guanyin, and the king, queen and her two sisters building a temple on the mountain for her. She began her journey to a pure land and was about to cross over into heaven when she heard a cry of suffering from the world below. She turned around and saw the massive suffering endured by the people of the world. Filled with compassion, she returned to Earth, vowing never to leave till such time as all suffering has ended.

After her return to Earth, Guanyin was said to have stayed for a few years on the island of Mount Putuo where she practised meditation and helped the sailors and fishermen who got stranded. Guanyin is frequently worshipped as patron of sailors and fishermen due to this. She is said to frequently becalm the sea when boats are threatened with rocks. After some decades Guanyin returned to Fragrant Mountain to continue her meditation.

=== Guanyin and Shancai ===
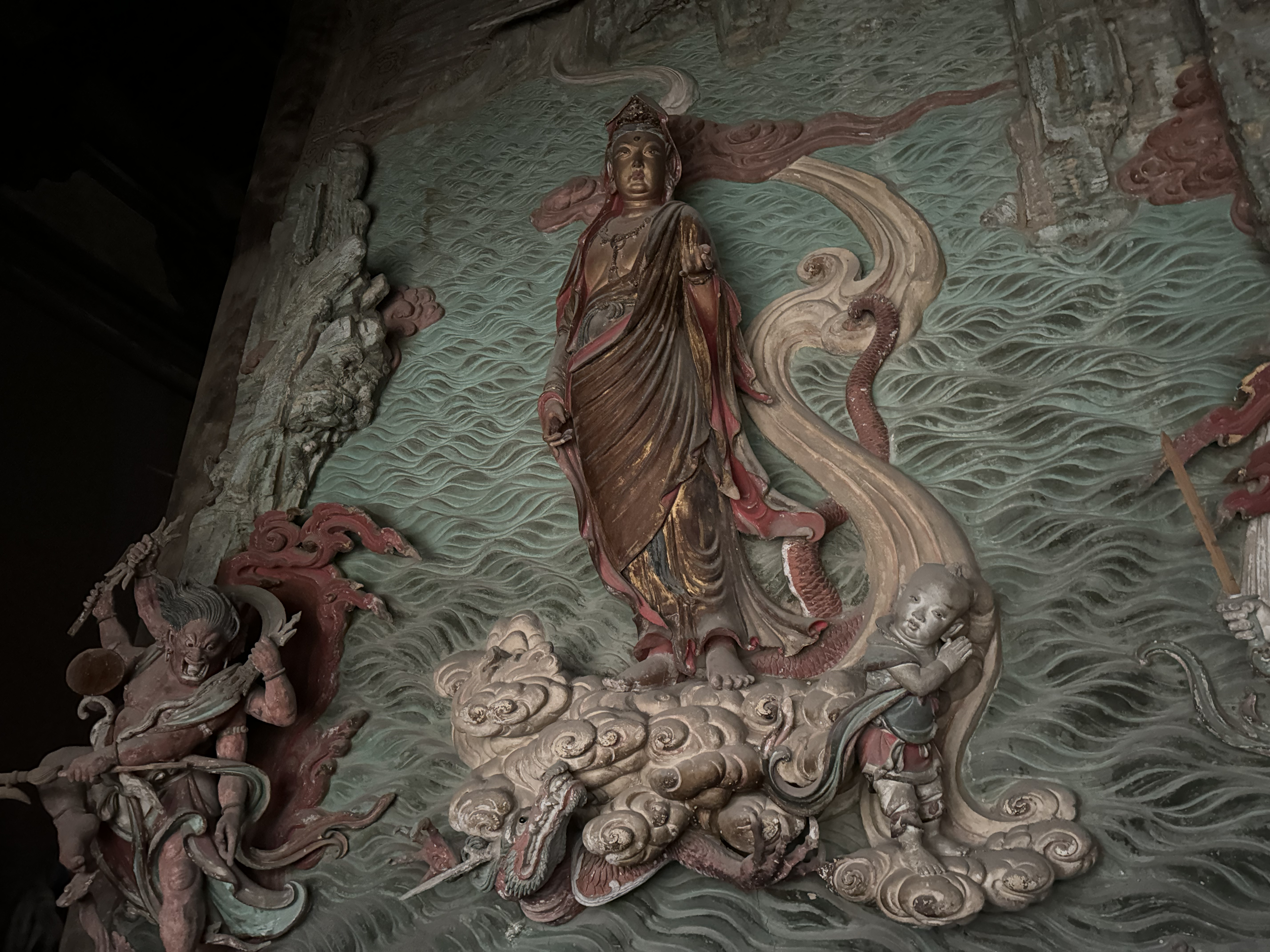
Yuan Dynasty (1271–1368) hanging sculpture depicting Guanyin crossing the sea at Fusheng Temple in Yuncheng, Shanxi, China. Guanyin rides on a cloud supported by a dragon, while two Wisdom Kings flank her and Shancai clasps his hand in reverence at her feet.

Legend has it that Shancai (also called Sudhana in Sanskrit) was a disabled boy from India who was very interested in studying the dharma. When he heard that there was a Buddhist teacher on the rocky island of Putuo, he quickly journeyed there to learn. Upon arriving at the island, he managed to find Guanyin despite his severe disability.

Guanyin, after having a discussion with Shancai, decided to test the boy's resolve to fully study the Buddhist teachings. She conjured the illusion of three sword-wielding pirates running up the hill to attack her. Guanyin took off and dashed to the edge of a cliff, the three illusions still chasing her. Shancai, seeing that his teacher was in danger, hobbled uphill. Guanyin then jumped over the edge of the cliff, and soon after this the three bandits followed. Shancai, still wanting to save his teacher, managed to crawl his way over the cliff edge.

Shancai fell down the cliff but was halted in midair by Guanyin, who now asked him to walk. Shancai found that he could walk normally and that he was no longer crippled. When he looked into a pool of water he also discovered that he now had a very handsome face. From that day forth, Guanyin taught Shancai the entire dharma.

=== Guanyin and Longnü ===
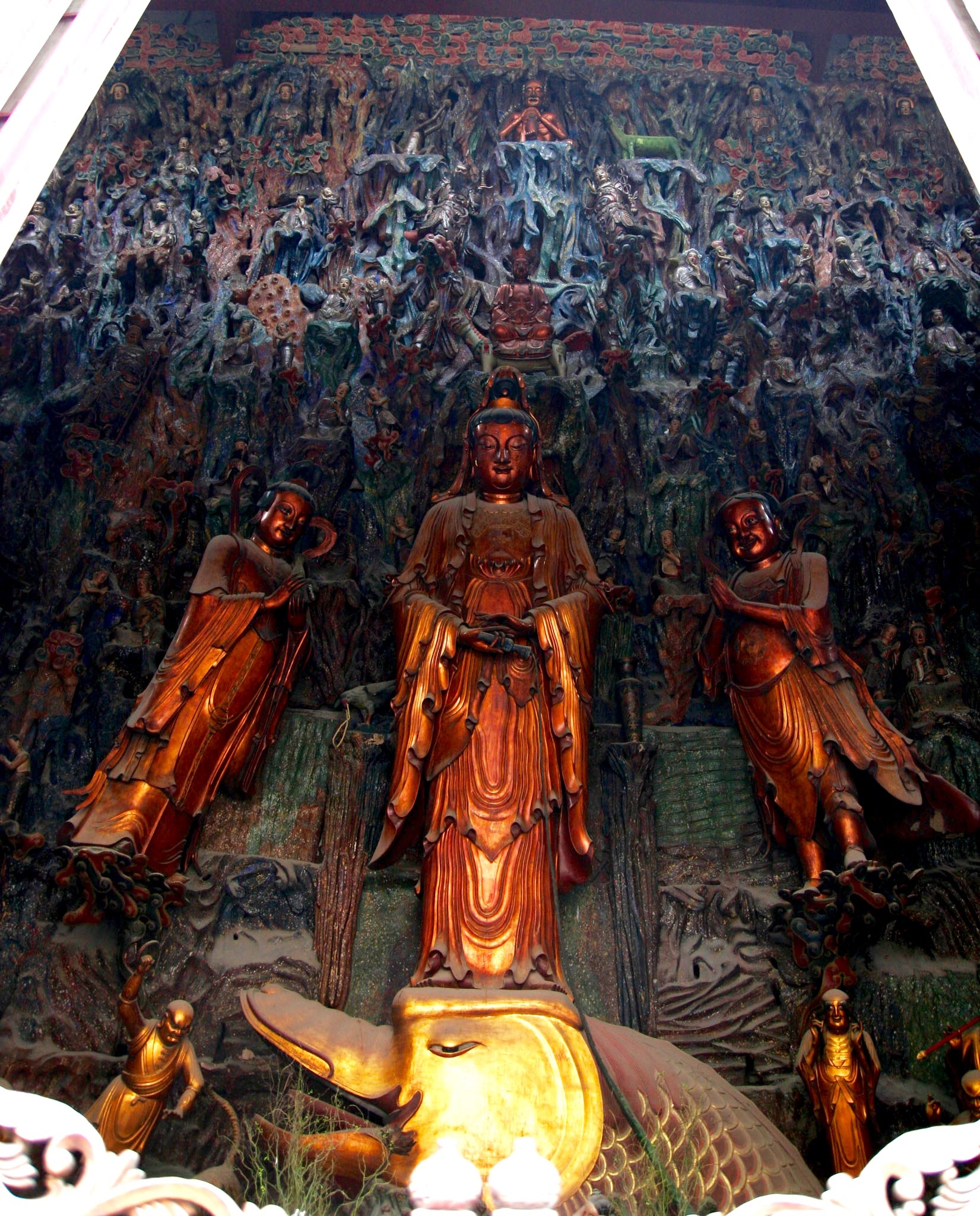
Statue of Guanyin flanked by Shancai and Longnü at Lingyin Temple in Hangzhou, China. The mural behind them depicts the penultimate chapter of the Avataṃsaka Sūtra, centering on Shancai. In the chapter, Shancai, in pursuit of enlightenment, goes on a pilgrimage to 53 different spiritual teachers. Other than the teachers in the sūtra, the 150 clay sculptures in the mural also depict other Buddhist figures such the main characters of Journey to the West, the Four Heavenly Kings and Ji Gong. Figures of Dizang and Shijiamounifo (depicting his cultivation prior to becoming the Buddha) are also incorporated into the top and middle portions of the mural respectively.

Many years after Shancai became a disciple of Guanyin, a distressing event happened in the South China Sea. The third son of one of the Dragon Kings was caught by a fisherman while swimming in the form of a fish. Being stuck on land, he was unable to transform back into his dragon form. His father, despite being a mighty Dragon King, was unable to do anything while his son was on land. Distressed, the son called out to all of Heaven and Earth.

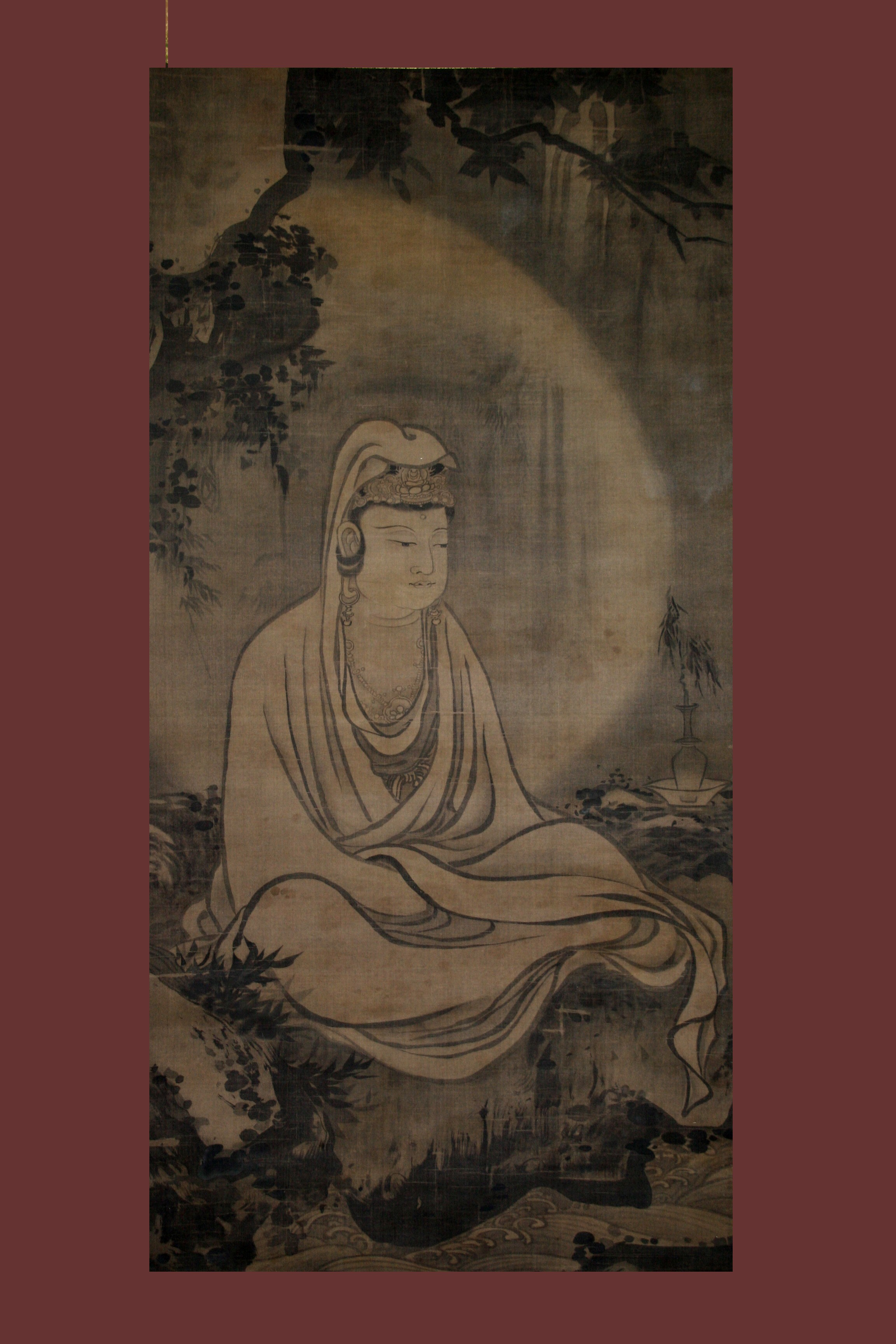
14th-century Song dynasty painting of Baiyi Guanyin (Chinese: 白衣觀音, Sanskrit: Pāṇḍaravāsinī Avalokiteśvara, lit: "White-Robed Guanyin") by the Chinese painter Muqi.

Hearing this cry, Guanyin quickly sent Shancai to recover the fish and gave him all the money she had. The fish at this point was about to be sold in the market. It was causing quite a stir as it was alive hours after being caught. This drew a much larger crowd than usual at the market. Many people decided that this prodigious situation meant that eating the fish would grant them immortality, and so all present wanted to buy the fish. Soon a bidding war started, and Shancai was easily outbid.

Shancai begged the fish seller to spare the life of the fish. The crowd, now angry at someone so daring, was about to pry him away from the fish when Guanyin projected her voice from far away, saying "A life should definitely belong to one who tries to save it, not one who tries to take it."

The crowd, realising their shameful actions and desire, dispersed. Shancai brought the fish back to Guanyin, who promptly returned it to the sea. There the fish transformed back to a dragon and returned home. Paintings of Guanyin today sometimes portray her holding a fish basket, which represents the aforementioned tale.

As a reward for Guanyin saving his son, the Dragon King sent his daughter, a girl called Longnü ("dragon girl"), to present Guanyin with the Pearl of Light. The Pearl of Light was a precious jewel owned by the Dragon King that constantly shone. Longnü, overwhelmed by the presence of Guanyin, asked to be her disciple so that she might study the dharma. Guanyin accepted her offer with just one request: that Longnü be the new owner of the Pearl of Light.

In popular iconography, Longnü and Shancai are often seen alongside Guanyin as two children. Longnü is seen either holding a bowl or an ingot, which represents the Pearl of Light, whereas Shancai is seen with palms joined and knees slightly bent to show that he was once crippled.

=== Guanyin and the Filial Parrot ===
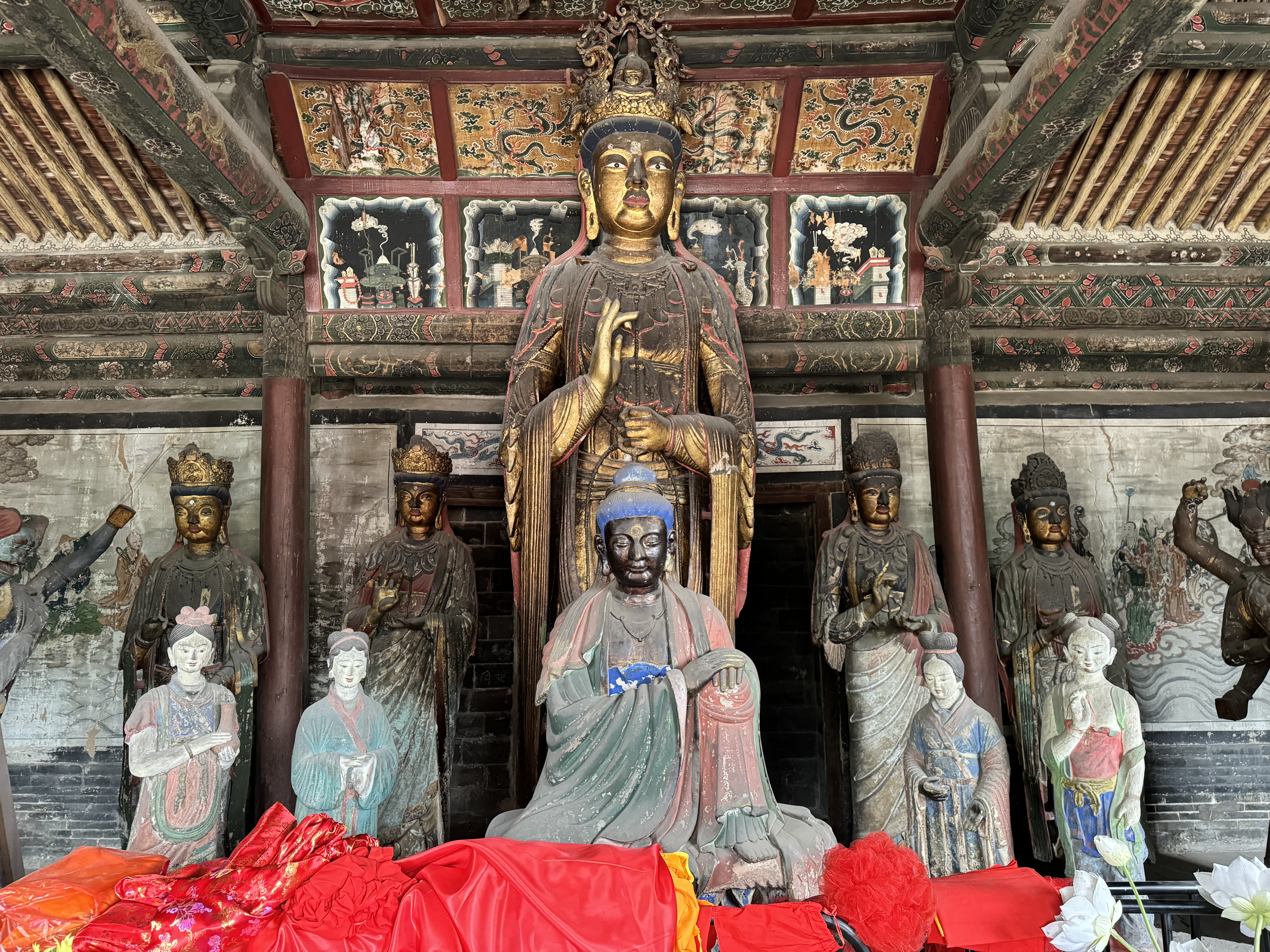
Liao dynasty (916–1125) statue of Guanyin surrounded by attendant Bodhisattvas and humans, with a statue of a Buddha enshrined in front, and statues of the Eight Wisdom Kings arrayed on both flanks, at Datong Guanyin-tang, Datong, Shanxi, China.

In a story first dating to the Ming dynasty, a parrot becomes a disciple of Guanyin. Set during the prosperous Tang dynasty, the story focuses on a family of white parrots who nest in a tree. One young parrot in the family is especially intelligent, and can recite sutras, chant the name of Amitābha, and in some versions is even able to compose poetry. One day, the father parrot is killed by hunters. When the mother parrot goes to see what happened, she is blinded by the hunters. When the intelligent young parrot goes to find cherries (sometimes specified as lychees) to feed its mother, it is captured by the same hunters. By the time it escapes, its mother has died. After it has mourned the death of its mother and provided her with a proper funeral, the Earth God suggests that the parrot worship Guanyin. Guanyin, moved by the filial piety of the parrot, allows its parents to be reborn in the Pure Land. This story was told in the Tale of the Filial Parrot (Chinese: 鶯哥孝義傳; pinyin: Yīnggē xiàoyì zhuàn) and then retold in the later Precious Scroll of the Parrot (Chinese: 鸚哥寶卷; pinyin: Yīnggē bǎojuàn).

In popular iconography, the parrot is coloured white and usually seen hovering to the right side of Guanyin with either a pearl or a prayer bead clasped in its beak. The parrot became a symbol of filial piety.

=== Guanyin and Chen Jinggu ===
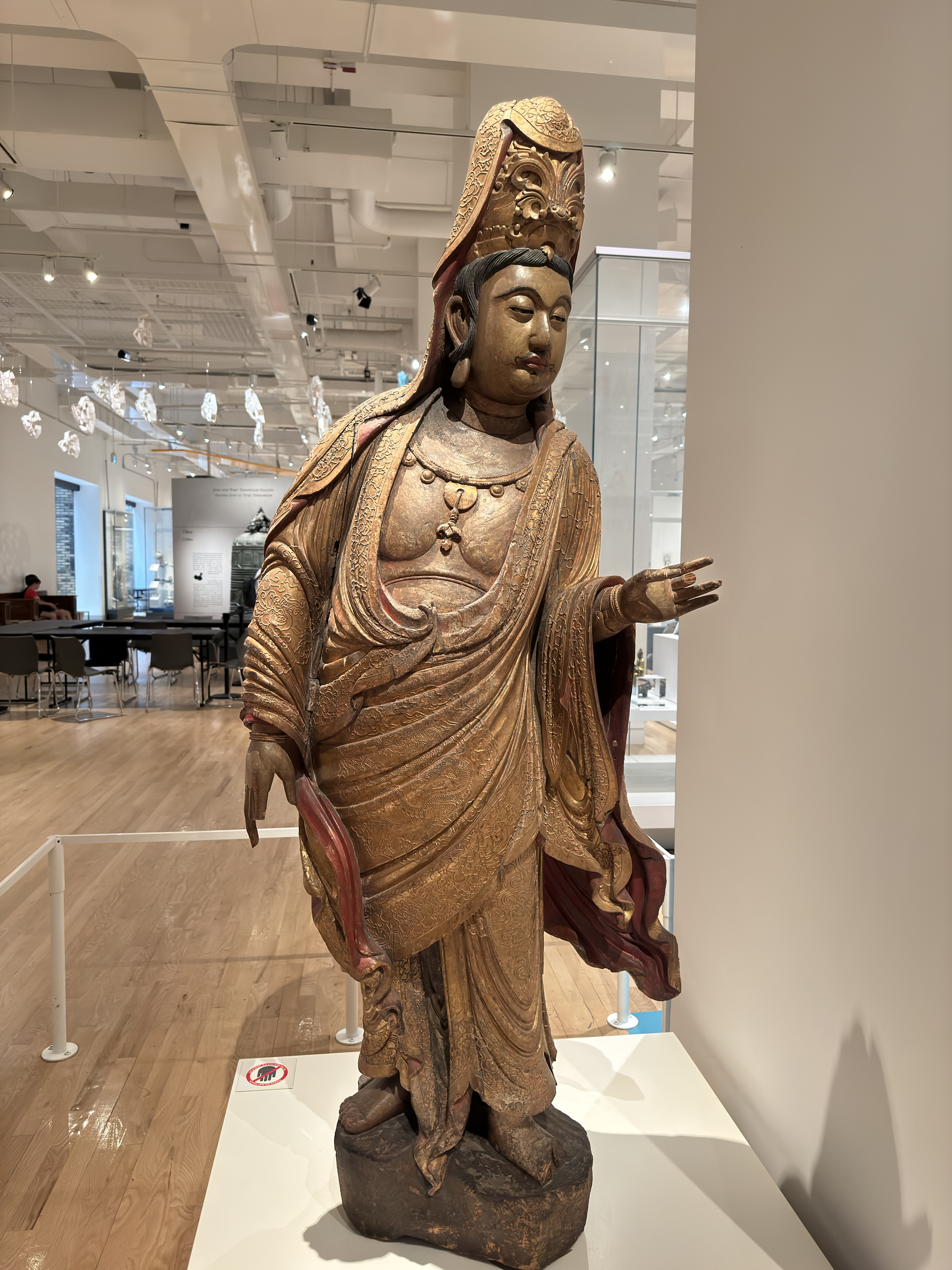
Chinese Yuan dynasty (1271 - 1368) gold-lacquered wooden statue of Guanyin, held at the Royal Ontario Museum. Reportedly from a temple in Zezhou, Shanxi, China.

Chen Jinggu is said to be related to Guanyin via the following story. One day in Quanzhou, Fujian, the people needed money to build a bridge. Guanyin turned into an attractive lady and said she would marry any man who could hit her with silver. Many tried, and Guanyin was able to accumulate a lot of silver ingots through this process. Eventually one of the Eight Immortals, Lü Dongbin, helped a merchant hit her hair with some silver.

- Guanyin's hair then floated away and became a white demon female snake. The snake would seduce men and kill other women.
- Guanyin then disappeared, but she let some of her blood from her finger flow down the river. A woman named Ge Furen (葛妇人 Lady Ge), whose husband was from the Chen family, then drank some of Guanyin's blood from the water and became pregnant, giving birth to Chen Jinggu. Later Chen Jinggu would fight and kill the white demon snake.
- As for the merchant, he later reincarnated as Liu Qi (劉杞) and would marry Chen Jinggu.

The story continues with how Chen Jinggu grew up, studied at Lüshan, and eventually saved Northern Fujian from drought while defeating the white demon snake, but at the cost of sacrificing her own child. It is said that she died of either miscarriage or hemorrhage from the self-abortion.

Parallels have also been argued between the tale of Chen Jinggu and another Fujian legend, the tale of Li Ji slays the Giant Serpent.

=== Quan Âm Thị Kính ===
Quan Âm Thị Kính (觀音氏敬) is a Vietnamese verse recounting the life of a woman, Thị Kính. She was accused falsely of having intended to kill her husband, and when she disguised herself as a man to lead a religious life in a Buddhist temple, she was again falsely blamed for having committed sexual intercourse with a girl named Thị Mầu. She was accused of impregnating her, which was strictly forbidden by Buddhist law. However, thanks to her endurance of all indignities and her spirit of self-sacrifice, she could enter into Nirvana and became Goddess of Mercy (Phật Bà Quan Âm). P. Q. Phan's 2014 opera The Tale of Lady Thị Kính is based on this story.

=== Other manifestations of Guanyin ===
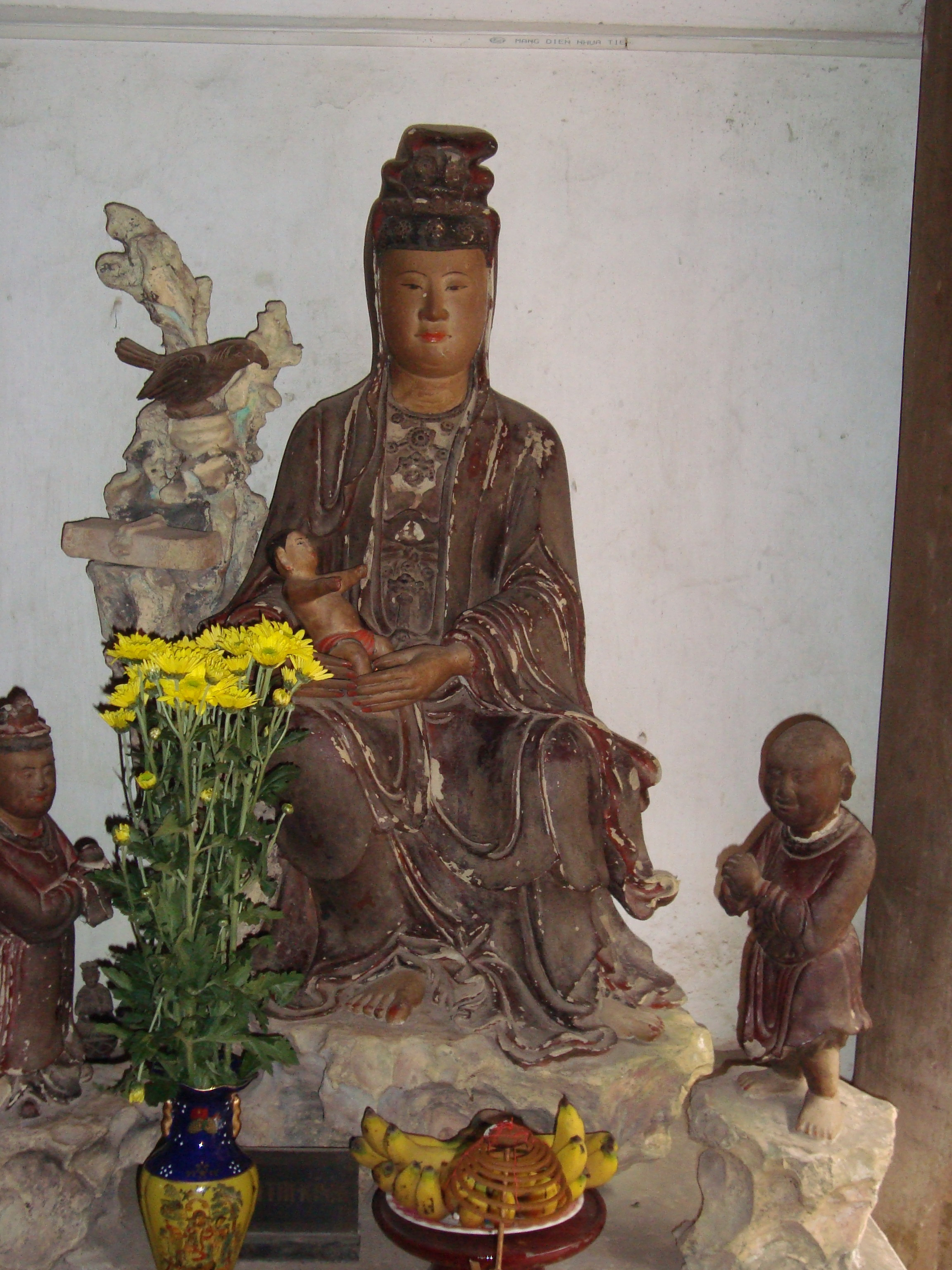
Quan Âm Tống Tử (Chữ Hán: 觀音送子, Statue of the Child-giving Quan Âm) in Tây Phương Temple in Thạch Thất, Hanoi, Vietnam.

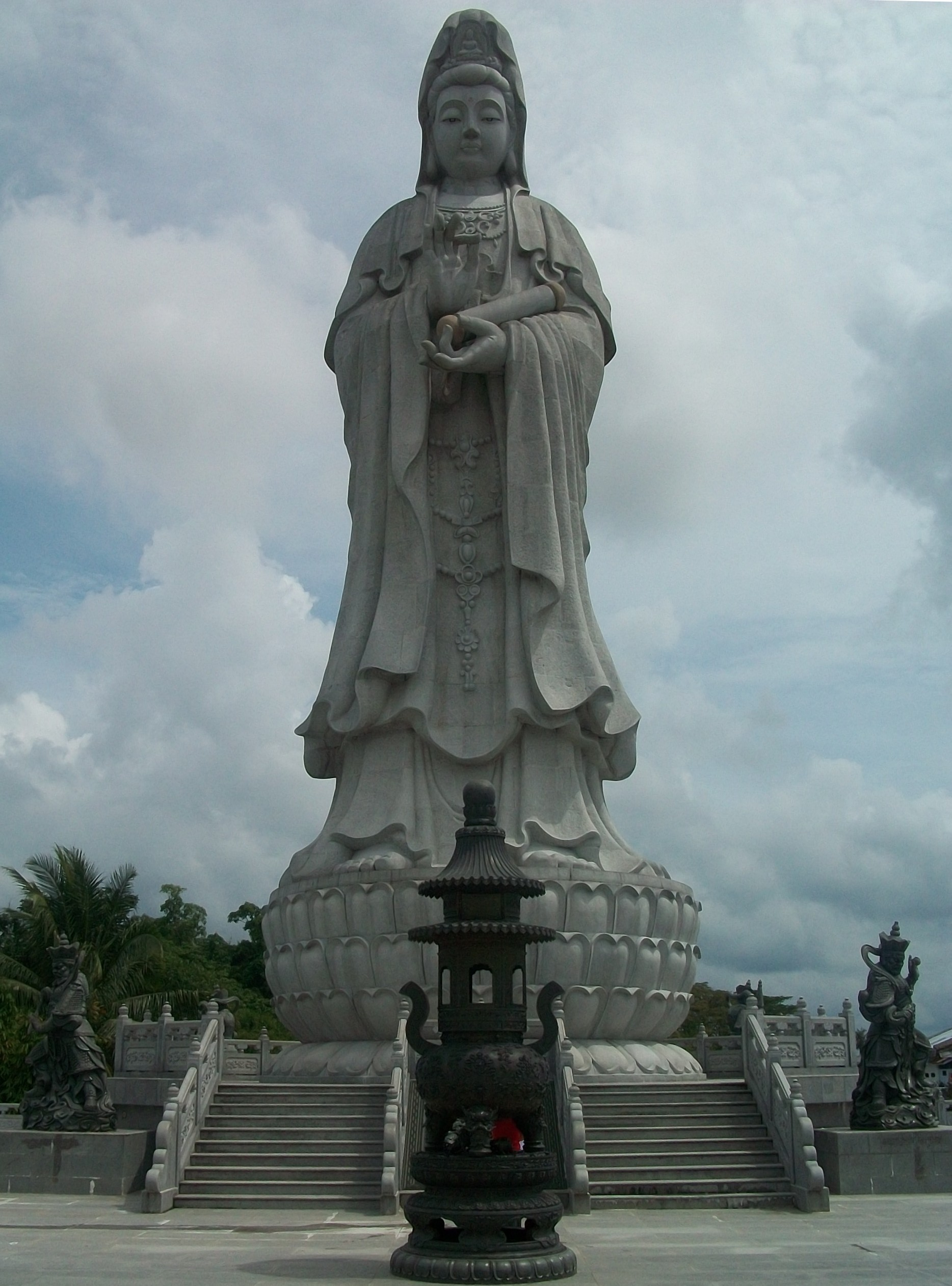
Guanyin statue as pose of The Guanyin of the Southern Seas in Avalokitesvara Buddhist temple at Pematangsiantar, North Sumatra, Indonesia.

In China, various native indigenous forms and aspects of Guanyin have been developed, along with associated legends, and portrayed in religious iconography. Aside from religious veneration, many of these manifestations also tended to appear in medieval and modern Chinese Buddhist miracle tales, fantasy fiction novels and plays. Some local forms include:

- Shuiyue Guanyin (Chinese: 水月觀音; pinyin: Shuǐyuè Guānyīn) – "Water-Moon Guanyin". A traditionally masculine form of Guanyin who is closely linked to and sometimes regarded as a further manifestation of the Thousand-Armed Guanyin. Traditionally invoked for good rebirth, safe childbirth as well as enlightenment, he is usually portrayed in statues and paintings as a young man or woman in a relaxed lalitasana pose beside a pond or lake with the moon reflected in the water, with the moon in the water being a metaphor for the Buddhist tenet of Śūnyatā.
- Songzi Guanyin (Chinese: 送子觀音; pinyin: Sòngzi Guānyīn) – "Child-giving Guanyin". An aspect of Guanyin which is closely linked to another manifestation, Baiyi Guanyin. She is primarily venerated as a fertility goddess and frequently invoked in prayers for children; usually portrayed in statues and paintings as a reclining white-robed young woman with a child sitting on her lap. Iconographic forms of this manifestation were noted by European travelers during the Ming and Qing dynasties to bear a striking resemblance to depictions of the Virgin Mary as the Madonna with Child. This manifestation is also syncretized into Taoism and Chinese folk religion as Songzi Niangniang.
- Baiyi Guanyin (Chinese: 白衣觀音; pinyin: Báiyī Guānyīn) – "White Robed Guanyin". A traditionally feminine form of Guanyin who is closely linked to another manifestation, Songzi Guanyin. Like that manifestation, Baiyi Guanyin is usually venerated as a fertility goddess and invoked in prayers for children. She is usually portrayed in statues and painting as a young woman dressed in a white robe which sometimes covers the head, acting as a veil. The significance of the color white in this manifestation was influenced by tantric sutras as well as mandalas such as the Mandala of the Two Realms which frequently depict Guanyin as being clad in white.
- Yulan Guanyin (Chinese: 魚籃觀音; pinyin: Yúlán Guānyīn) – "Fish Basket Guanyin". A form of Guanyin that originates from a legend about Guanyin descending as an avatar in the form of a beautiful young fisherwoman in order to convert a town of vicious, evil men into Buddhists. Usually portrayed in statues and paintings as a young woman holding a fish-basket, this manifestation also appears in the popular Ming dynasty novel Journey To The West, one of the Four Classic Chinese Novels, where she uses the fish basket to capture a sea demon.
- Nanhai Guanyin (Chinese: 南海觀音; pinyin: Nánhǎi Guānyīn) – "Guanyin Of The Southern Seas". A form of Guanyin that became popularized after the establishment of Mount Putuo as Guanyin's bodhimaṇḍa and a major Chinese Buddhist pilgrimage center. Usually portrayed in statues and paintings as a young woman in a relaxed rājalīlā pose meditating on Mount Putuo, or Potalaka. Certain iconographic details vary from depiction to depiction, with some including a stand of bamboo before the Bodhisattva, or a vase with willow branches, or Shancai and Longnü standing beside her as attendants.

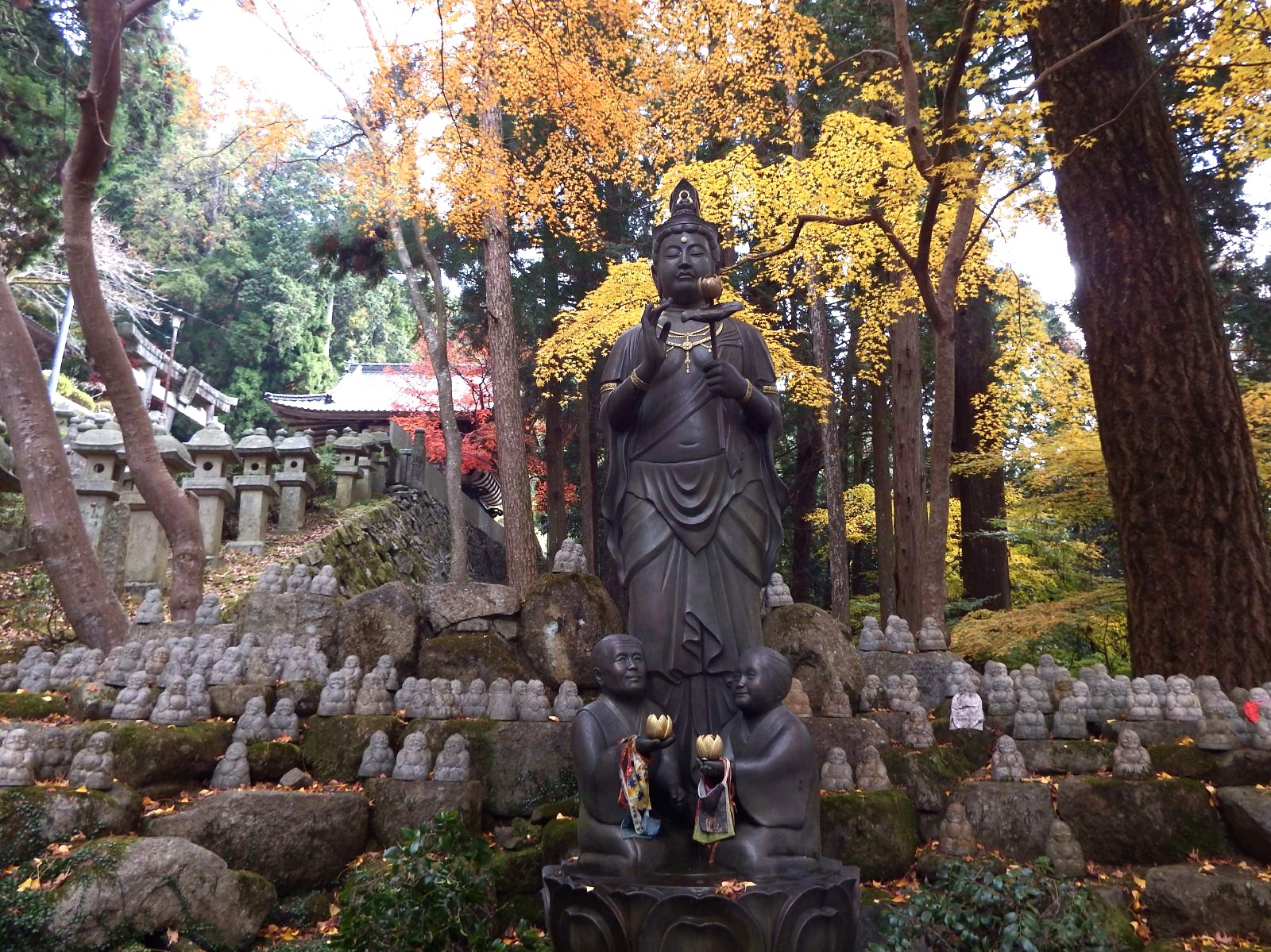
Statue of Bokefuji Kannon at Imakumano Kannonji Temple in Kyoto, Japan.

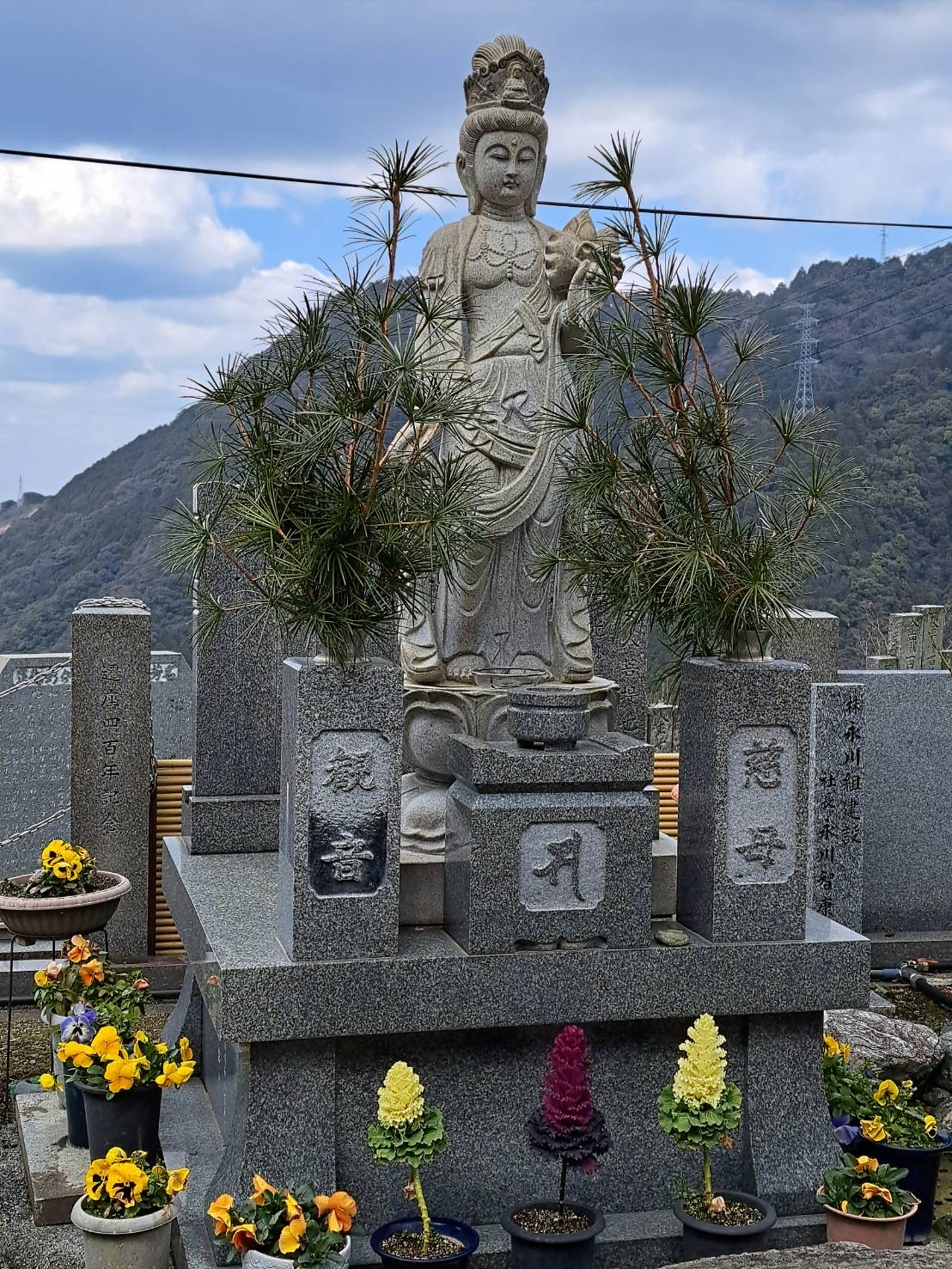
Statue of Jibo Kannon at Daifuku-ji in Saijo, Ehime, Japan.

Similarly in Japan, several local manifestations of Guanyin, known there primarily as Kannon or, reflecting an older pronunciation, Kwannon, have also been developed natively, supplanting some Japanese deities, with some having been developed as late as the 20th century. Some local forms include:

- Bokefuji Kannon – "Senility-healing Kannon". A 20th century invention by a religious goods manufacturer due to rising concern about senility and dementia. Depicted as a woman with small figures of an elderly man and woman at her feet.
- Jibo Kannon – "Compassionate-mother Kannon". Kannon as a woman holding an infant. Became especially popular in Japan when suppressed Christians used the image to represent the Virgin Mary and Christ Child.
- Koyasu Kannon – "Safe-childbirth Kannon". Kannon as a woman, holding or often nursing an infant. Predates Jibo Kannon by several centuries. Similarly used by Christians.
- Mizuko Kuyō Kannon – "New-born Memorial-service Kannon". (Mizuko Kuyō is a memorial service held for children who are born dead or die shortly after birth.) A woman surrounded by or holding several children. A 20th century development in response to aborted pregnancies as well as stillbirths and spontaneous pregnancy terminations.
- Maria Kannon – "Mary Kannon". A statue of the Virgin Mary disguised to look like a statue of Kannon. Often contains a Christian symbol, either obscured on the surface or hidden within the statue. Arose during a time when Christianity was proscribed during the Tokugawa shogunate.
- Yōkihi Kannon – "Yang Guifei Kannon" (Yang Guifei is read as "Yōkihi" in Japan). Yang Guifei was a famed Chinese Tang dynasty era beauty. Despite being depicted as an epitome of feminine beauty Yōkihi Kannon usually sport a moustache designed to desexualise the icon and demonstrate how the capacity for enlightenment does not depend upon a person's sex.

In Tibet, Guanyin is revered under the name Chenrezig. Unlike much of other East Asia Buddhism where Guanyin is usually portrayed as female or androgynous, Chenrezig is revered in male form. While similarities of the female form of Guanyin with the female buddha or boddhisattva Tara are noted—particularly the aspect of Tara called Green Tara—Guanyin is rarely identified with Tara. Through Guanyin's identity as Avalokitesvara, she is a part of the padmakula (Lotus family) of buddhas. The buddha of the Lotus family is Amitābha, whose consort is Pāṇḍaravāsinī. Guanyin's female form is sometimes said to have been inspired by Pāṇḍaravāsinī.

== Role in East Asian Buddhism ==
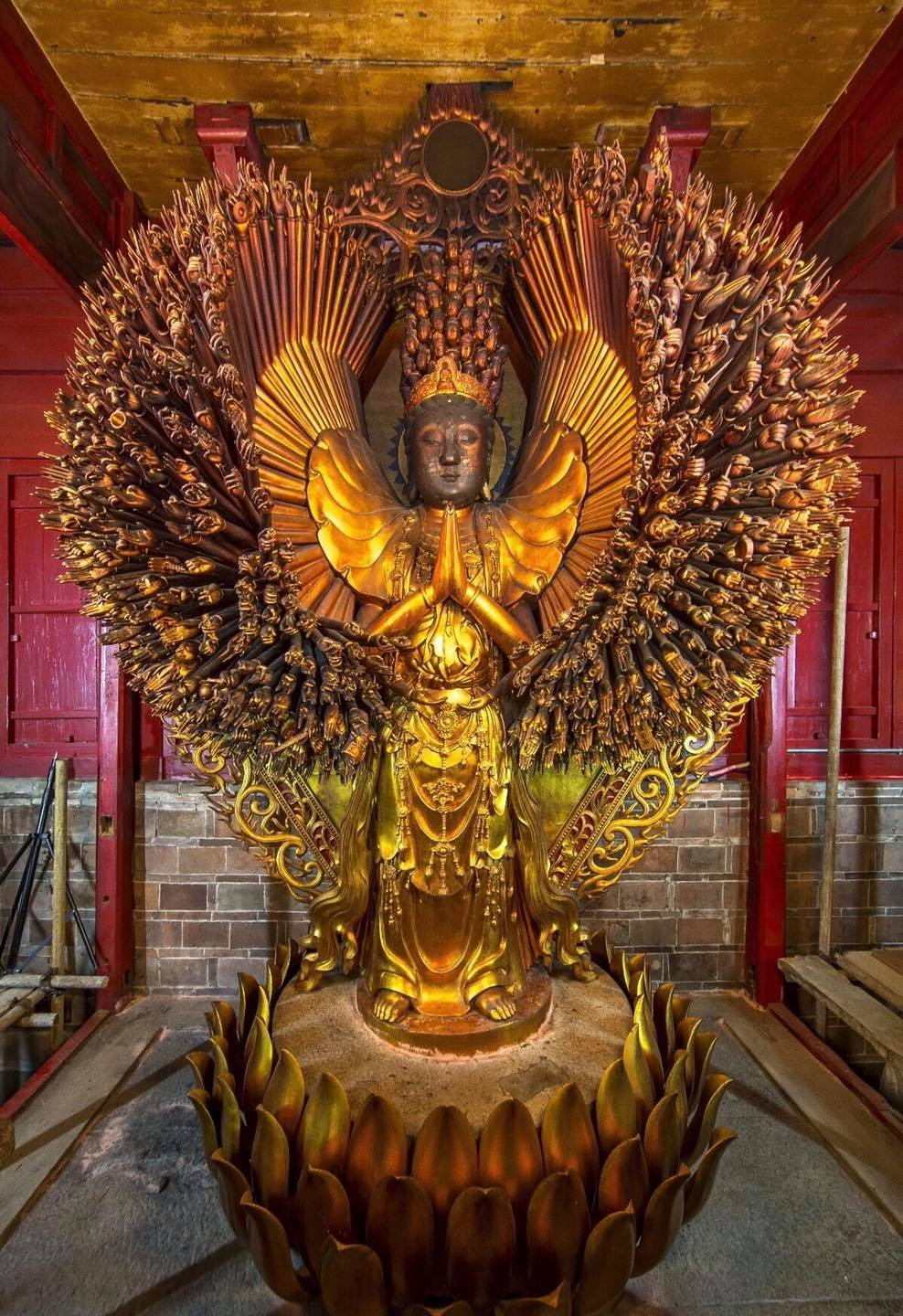
Ming dynasty wooden statue of the Thousand-Armed Guanyin (Avalokiteśvara in Chinese), enshrined in Longshan Temple in Fujian, China. Standing at 4.2 metres, the statue features 1008 arms and more than 25 heads.

In East Asian Buddhism, Guanyin is the Bodhisattva Avalokiteśvara. Among the Chinese, Avalokiteśvara is almost exclusively called Guanshiyin Pusa (觀世音菩薩). The Chinese translation of many Buddhist sutras has in fact replaced the Chinese transliteration of Avalokitesvara with Guanshiyin (觀世音).

In Chinese culture, the popular belief and worship of Guanyin as a goddess by the populace is generally not viewed to be in conflict with the Bodhisattva Avalokitesvara's nature. In fact the widespread worship of Guanyin as a "Goddess of Mercy and Compassion" is seen by Buddhists as the boundless salvific nature of Bodhisattva Avalokiteśvara at work (in Buddhism, this is referred to as Guanyin's "skillful means", or upaya). The Buddhist canon states that Bodhisattvas can assume whatsoever gender and form is needed to liberate beings from ignorance and dukkha. With specific reference to Avalokitesvara, he is stated both in the Lotus Sutra (Chapter 25 "Perceiver of the World's Sounds" or "Universal Gateway"), and the Śūraṅgama Sūtra to have appeared before as a woman or a goddess to save beings from suffering and ignorance. His salvific power is emphasized in various Chinese Buddhist rituals, such as the tantric Yujia Yankou rite, where the monastic performing the rite practices deity yoga with Guanyin as the yidam in order to facilitate the ultimate liberation of hungry ghosts as well as prolonging the lifespans of the living and warding off disasters.

Guanyin is immensely popular among Chinese Buddhists, especially those from devotional schools. She is generally seen as a source of unconditional love and, more importantly, as a saviour. In her Bodhisattva vow, Guanyin promises to answer the cries and pleas of all sentient beings and to liberate them from their own karmic woes. Based on the Lotus Sutra and the Shurangama sutra, Avalokitesvara is generally seen as a saviour, both spiritually and physically. The sutras state that through his saving grace even those who have no chance of being enlightened can be enlightened, and those deep in negative karma can still find salvation through his compassion. In Mahayana Buddhism, gender is no obstacle to attaining enlightenment (or nirvana). The Buddhist concept of non-duality applies here. The Vimalakirti Sutra's "Goddess" chapter clearly illustrates an enlightened being who is also a female and deity. In the Lotus Sutra, a maiden became enlightened in a very short time span. The view that Avalokiteśvara is also the goddess Guanyin does not seem contradictory to Buddhist beliefs. Guanyin has been a buddha called the "Tathāgata of Brightness of Correct Dharma" (正法明如來).

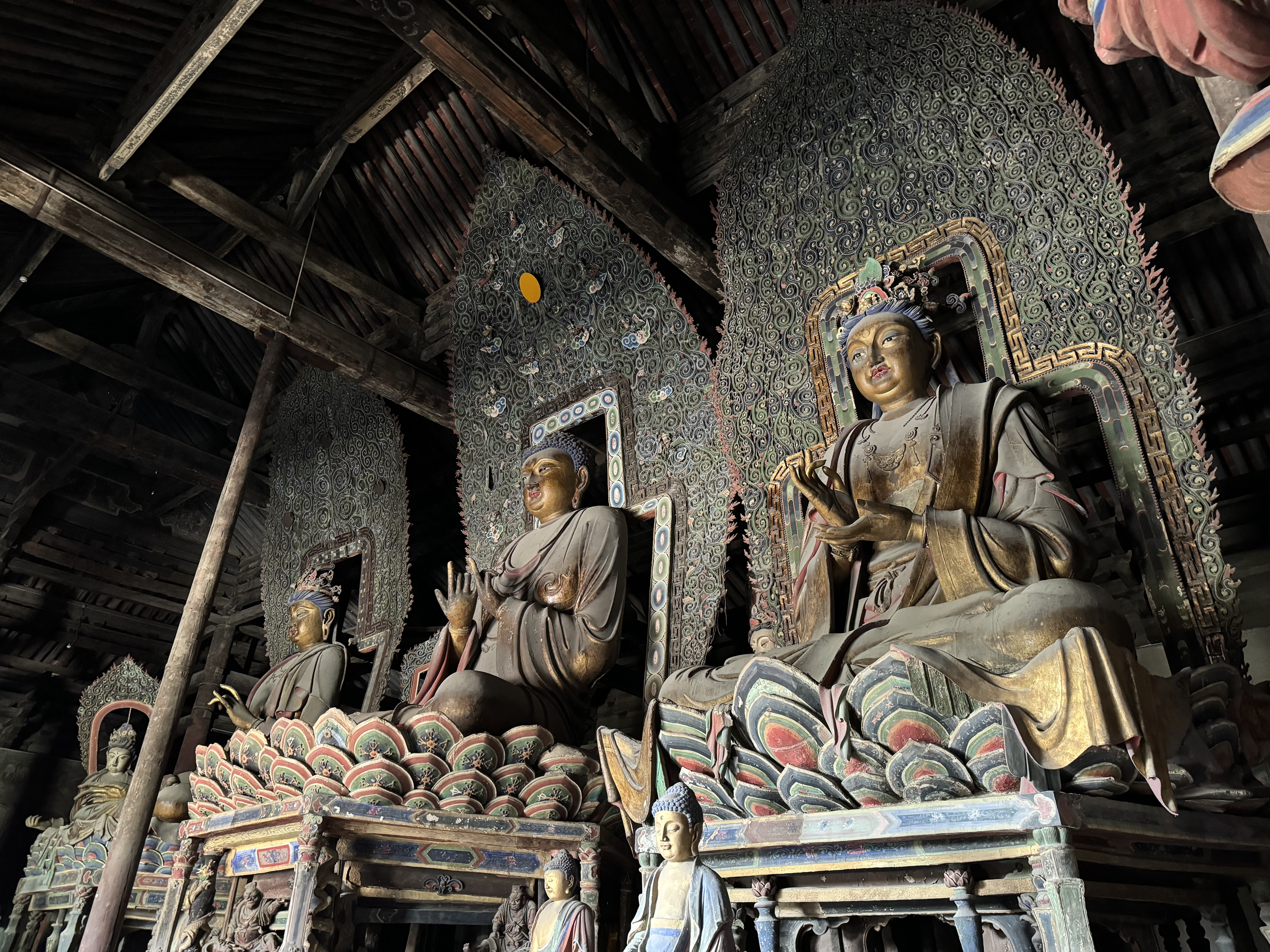
Ming dynasty (1368 - 1644) statues of the triad of Sukhāvatī, a popular grouping in Pure Land Buddhism, in Chongfu Temple in Shanxi, China. From left to right: Mahāsthāmaprāpta, Amitābha, Guanyin.

In Pure Land Buddhism, Guanyin is described as the "Barque of Salvation". Along with Amitābha and the Bodhisattva Mahasthamaprapta, she temporarily liberates beings out of the Wheel of Samsara into the Pure Land, where they will have the chance to accrue the necessary merit so as to be a Buddha in one lifetime. In Chinese Buddhist iconography, Guanyin is often depicted as meditating or sitting alongside one of the Buddhas and usually accompanied by another Bodhisattva. The Buddha and Bodhisattva that are portrayed together with Guanyin usually follow whichever school of Buddhism they represent. In Pure Land Buddhism, for example, Guanyin is frequently depicted on the left of Amitābha, while on the buddha's right is Mahasthamaprapta. Temples that revere the Bodhisattva Ksitigarbha usually depict him meditating beside Amitābha and Guanyin.

Even among Chinese Buddhist schools that are non-devotional, Guanyin is still highly venerated. Instead of being seen as an active external force of unconditional love and salvation, the personage of Guanyin is highly revered as the principle of compassion, mercy and love. The act, thought and feeling of compassion and love is viewed as Guanyin. A merciful, compassionate, loving individual is said to be Guanyin. A meditative or contemplative state of being at peace with oneself and others is seen as Guanyin.

In the Mahayana canon, the Heart Sutra is ascribed entirely to Guanyin. This is unique, since most Mahayana Sutras are usually ascribed to Gautama Buddha and the teachings, deeds or vows of the Bodhisattvas are described by Shakyamuni Buddha. In the Heart Sutra, Guanyin describes to the arhat Sariputta the nature of reality and the essence of the Buddhist teachings. The famous Buddhist saying "Form is emptiness, emptiness is form" (色即是空，空即是色) comes from this sutra.

== Association with vegetarianism ==
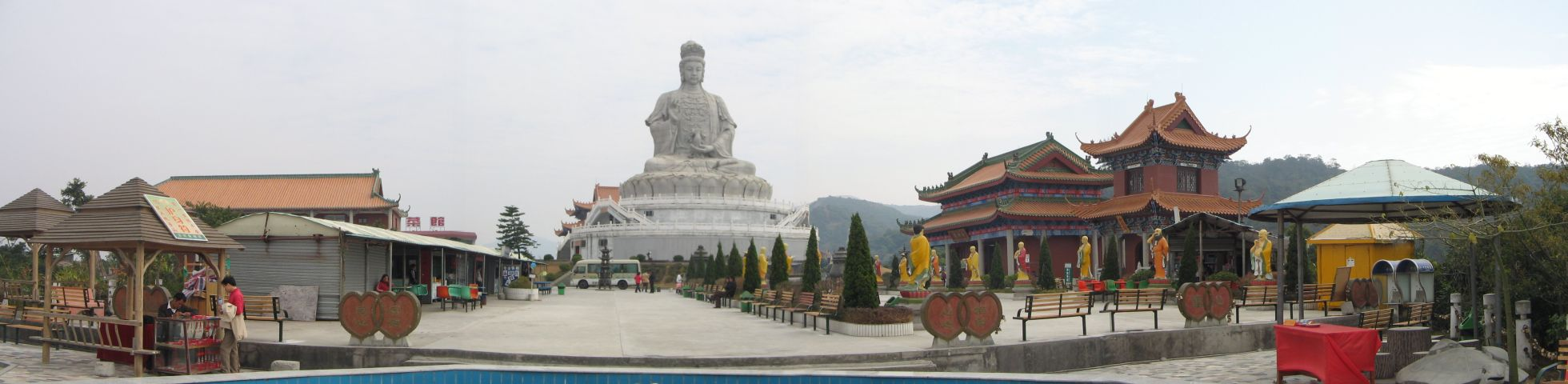
Guanyin Shan (Guanyin Mountain) temple in Dongguan, China.

Due to her symbolization of compassion, in East Asia, Guanyin is associated with vegetarianism. Buddhist cuisine is generally decorated with her image and she appears in most Buddhist vegetarian pamphlets and magazines. Also, there is a type of soil named after her that is known for its beneficial properties, such as preventing nausea and diarrhea. Chaoqi (Chinese: 炒祺/炒粸) is a traditional Chinese snack, consisting of dough pieces cooked in Guanyin Soil. The ingredients for Chaoqi dough are flour, eggs, sugar, and salt. Traditionally, it is flavored with five-spice powder, pepper leaf, and sesame, but it can also be flavored with brown sugar and jujube. The snack was traditionally taken on long journeys, as the soil helps preserve the dough.

== Role in other Eastern religions ==
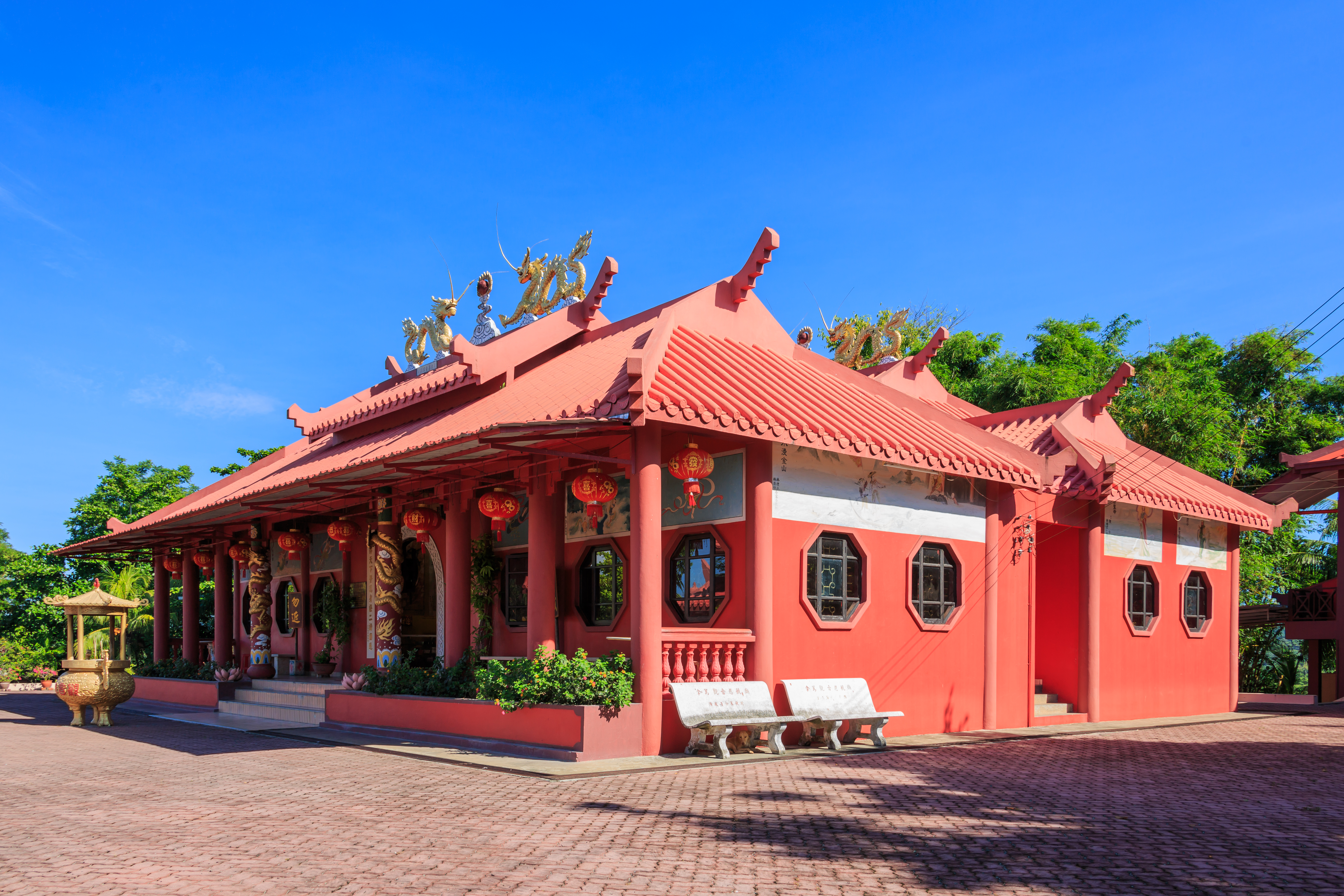
A Chinese folk religion temple devoted primarily to the goddess Guanyin, in Lahad Datu, Sabah, Malaysia.

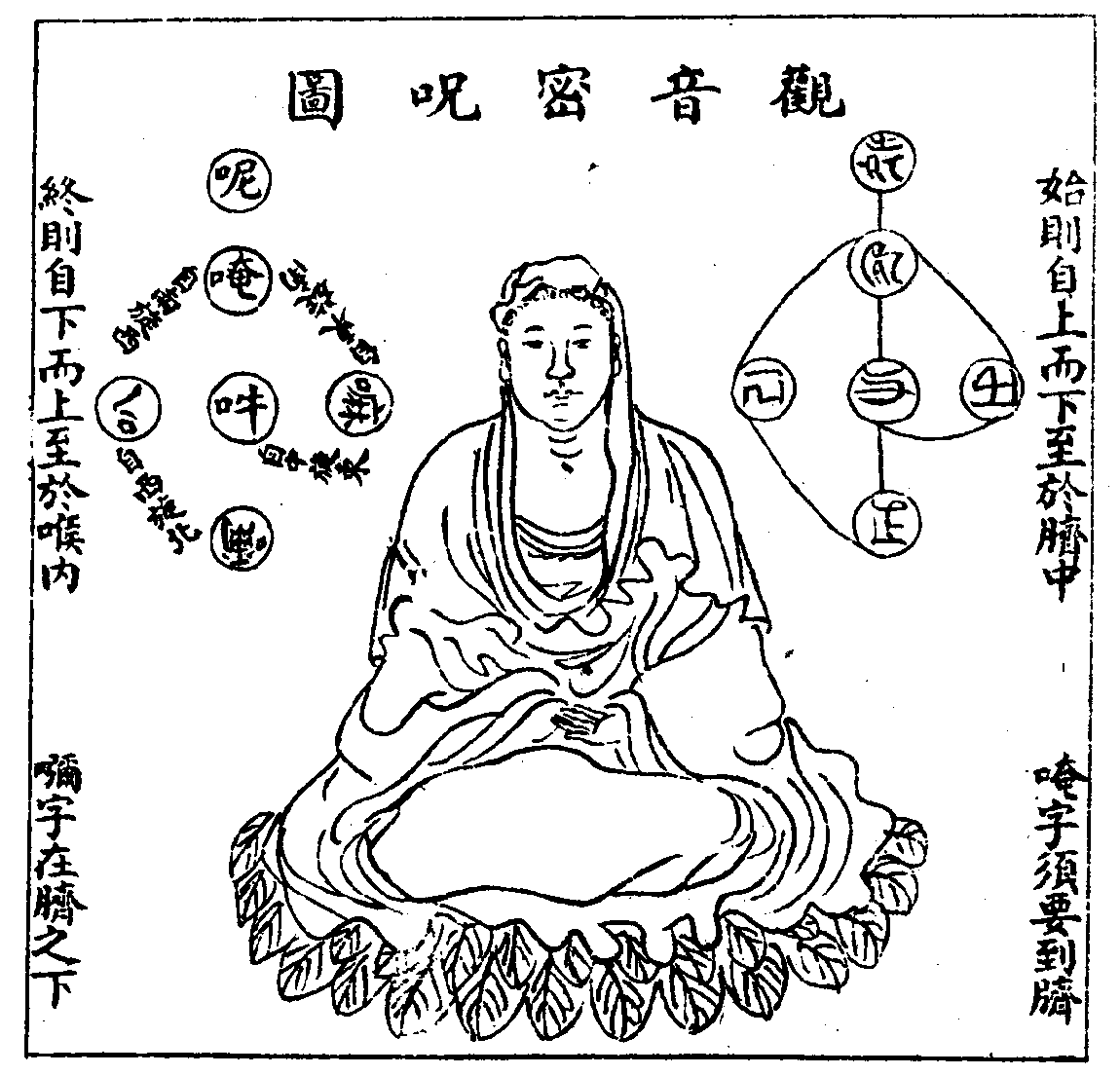
Guanyin's Esoteric Incantation 觀音密呪圖, 1615 Xingming guizhi.

Guanyin is an extremely popular goddess in Chinese folk religion, Chinese Buddhism, Confucianism, and Taoism. She is worshiped in many Chinese communities throughout East and Southeast Asia. In Taoism, records claim Guanyin was a Chinese woman who became an immortal, Cihang Zhenren in Shang dynasty or Xingyin (姓音). Some Taoist scriptures give her the title of Guanyin Dashi, sometimes informally Guanyin Fozu.

Guanyin is revered in the general Chinese population due to her unconditional love and compassion. She is generally regarded by many as the protector of women and children, perhaps due to iconographic confusion with images of Hariti. By this association, she is also seen as a fertility goddess capable of granting children to couples. An old Chinese superstition involves a woman who, wishing to have a child, offers a shoe to Guanyin. In Chinese culture, a borrowed shoe sometimes is used when a child is expected. After the child is born, the shoe is returned to its owner along with a new pair as a thank you gift.

Guanyin is also seen as the champion of the unfortunate, the sick, the weak, the needy, the disabled, the poor, and those in trouble. Some coastal and river areas of China regard her as the protector of fishermen, sailors, and generally people who are out at sea, thus many have also come to believe that Mazu, the goddess of the sea, is a manifestation of Guanyin. Due to her association with the legend of the Great Flood, where she sent down a dog holding rice grains in its tail after the flood, she is worshiped as an agrarian and agriculture goddess. In some quarters, especially among business people and traders, she is looked upon as a goddess of fortune. In recent years there have been claims of her being the protector of air travelers.

Guanyin is also a ubiquitous figure found within new religious movements of Asia:

- Within the Taiwan-based Yiguandao, Guanyin is called the "Ancient Buddha of the South Sea" (南海古佛) and frequently appears in their fuji. Guanyin is sometimes confused with Yuehui Bodhisattva (月慧菩薩) due to their similar appearance despite the latter usually depicited holding a scroll instead.
- Guanyin is called the "Ancient Buddha of the Holy Religion" (聖宗古佛) in Zaili teaching and Tiandi teachings. In Zaili teaching, she is the main deity worshipped.
- Ching Hai initiates her followers a meditation method called the "Quan Yin Method" to achieve enlightenment; followers also revere Ching Hai as an incarnation of Guanyin.
- Shinji Shumeikai acknowledges Guanyin or Kannon in Japanese as the deity of compassion or the Goddess of Mercy, who was actively guiding the founder Meishusama and represents a middle way between Zen and Pure Land Buddhism.
- Caodaism considers Guanyin, known as "Quan Am Tathagata" (Quan Âm Như Lai), as a Buddha and a teacher. She represents Buddhist doctrines and traditions as one of the three major lines of Caodaist doctrines (Buddhism, Taoism, and Confucianism). She also symbolizes utmost patience, harmony, and compassion. According to her Divine messages via seances, her main role is to teach the Tao to female disciples, and guide them towards divinity. Another of her well-known role is to save people from extreme sufferings, e.g. fire, drowning, wrong accusation/ imprisonment, etc. There is even a prayer named "Salvation from sufferings" for followers to cite in dire conditions.

== Similarity to the Virgin Mary ==
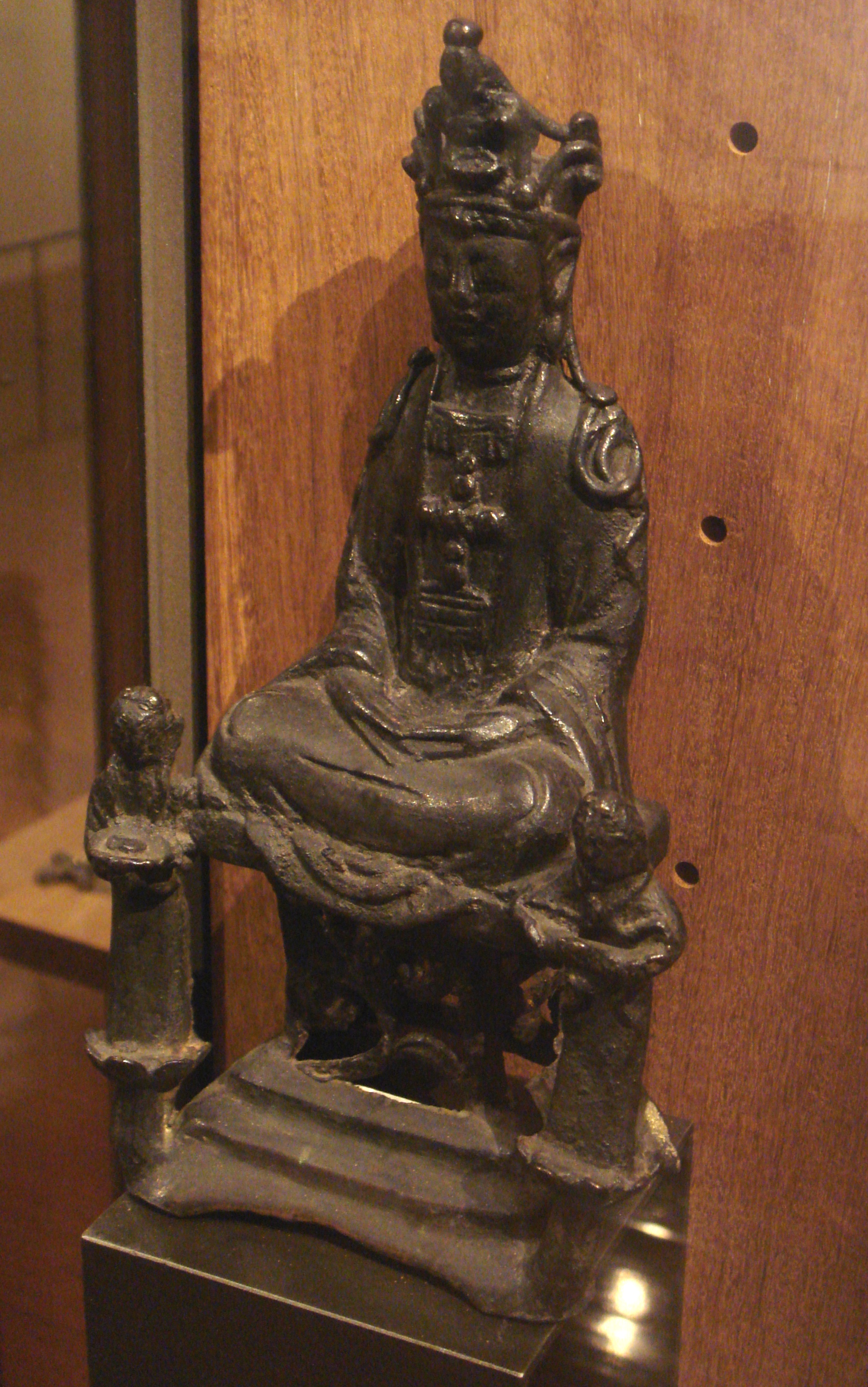
The Virgin Mary disguised as Kannon, Kakure Kirishitan, 17th century. Salle des Martyrs, Paris Foreign Missions Society.

Some Buddhist and Christian observers have commented on the similarity between Guanyin and Mary, mother of Jesus. This can be attributed to the representation of Guanyin holding a child in Chinese art and sculpture; it is believed that Guanyin is the patron saint of mothers and grants parents filial children, this apparition is popularly known as the "Child-Sending Guanyin" (送子觀音). One example of this comparison can be found in Tzu Chi, a Taiwanese Buddhist humanitarian organisation, which noticed the similarity between this form of Guanyin and the Virgin Mary. The organisation commissioned a portrait of Guanyin holding a baby, closely resembling the typical Catholic Madonna and Child painting. Copies of this portrait are now displayed prominently in Tzu Chi affiliated medical centres, especially since Tzu Chi's founder is a Buddhist master and her supporters come from various religious backgrounds.

During the Edo period in Japan, when Christianity was banned and punishable by death, some underground Christian groups venerated Jesus and the Virgin Mary by disguising them as statues of Kannon holding a child; such statues are known as Maria Kannon. Many had a cross hidden in an inconspicuous location. It is suggested the similarity comes from the conquest and colonization of the Philippines by Spain during the 16th century, when Asian cultures influenced engravings of the Virgin Mary, as evidenced, for example, in an ivory carving of the Virgin Mary by a Chinese carver.

The statue of Guanyin (Gwanse-eum) in Gilsangsa in Seoul, South Korea was sculpted by Catholic sculptor Choi Jong-tae, who modeled the statue after the Virgin Mary in hopes of fostering religious reconciliation in Korean society.

== Gallery ==
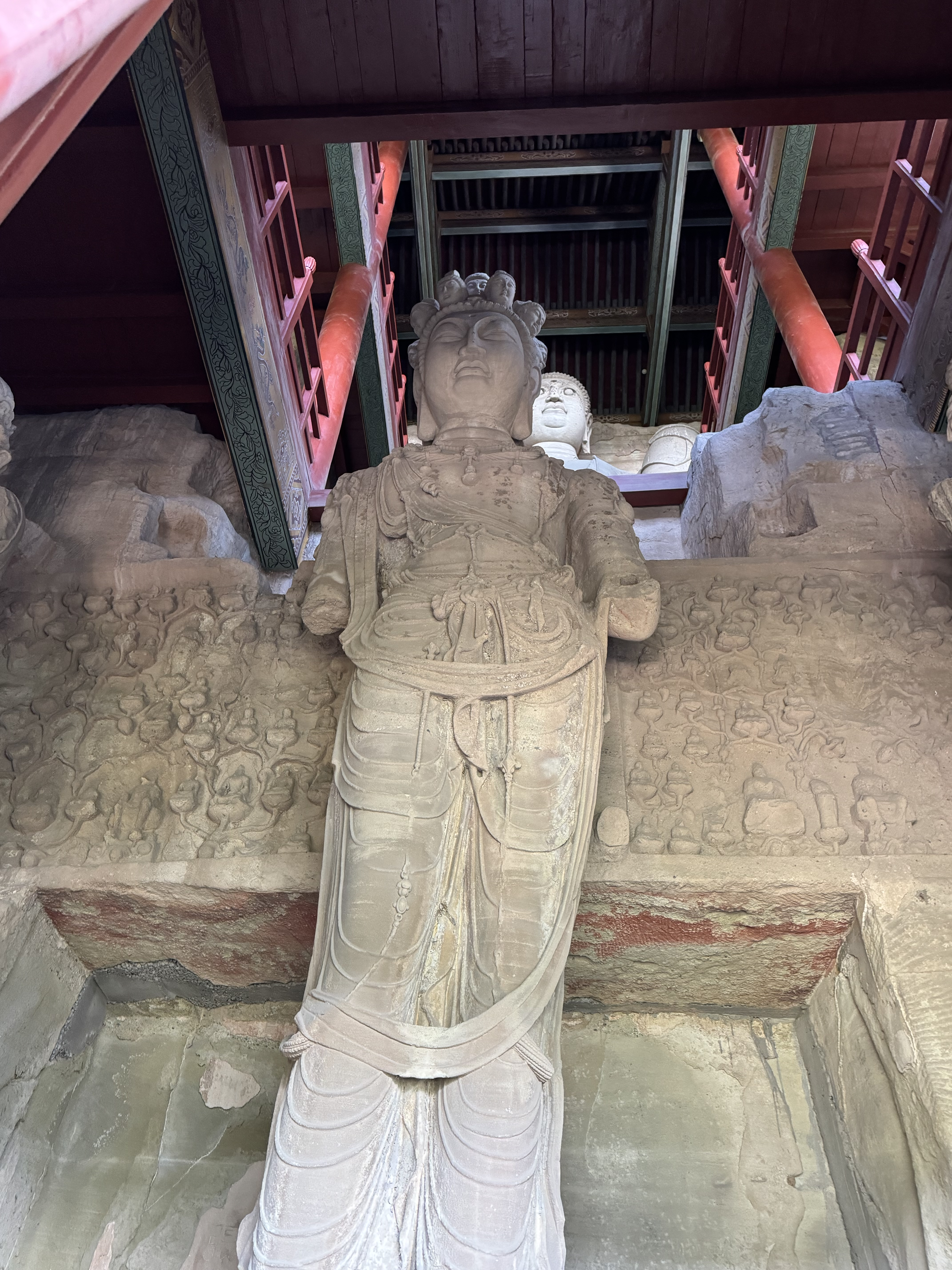
Statue of Shiyimian Guanyin, flanked by the Bodhisattvas Wenshu and Puxian at Tianlongshan Grottoes in Shanxi, China.

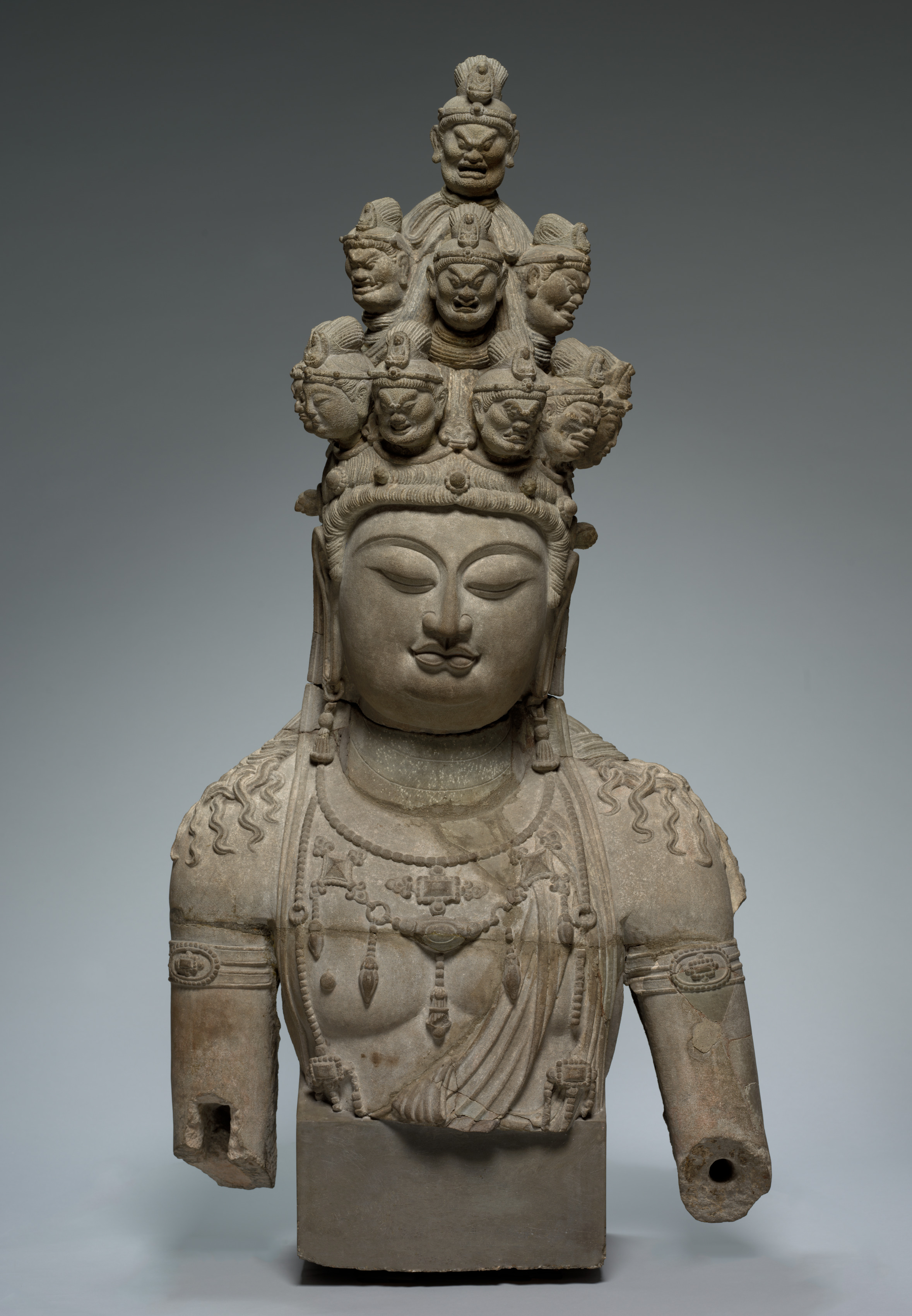
Tang dynasty (618–907) Chinese sandstone bust of Shiyimian Guanyin. Held at the Cleveland Museum of Art in Ohio, USA.

Tang dynasty (618–907) Chinese statue of Shiyimian Guanyin. Held at the Cleveland Museum of Art in Ohio, USA.

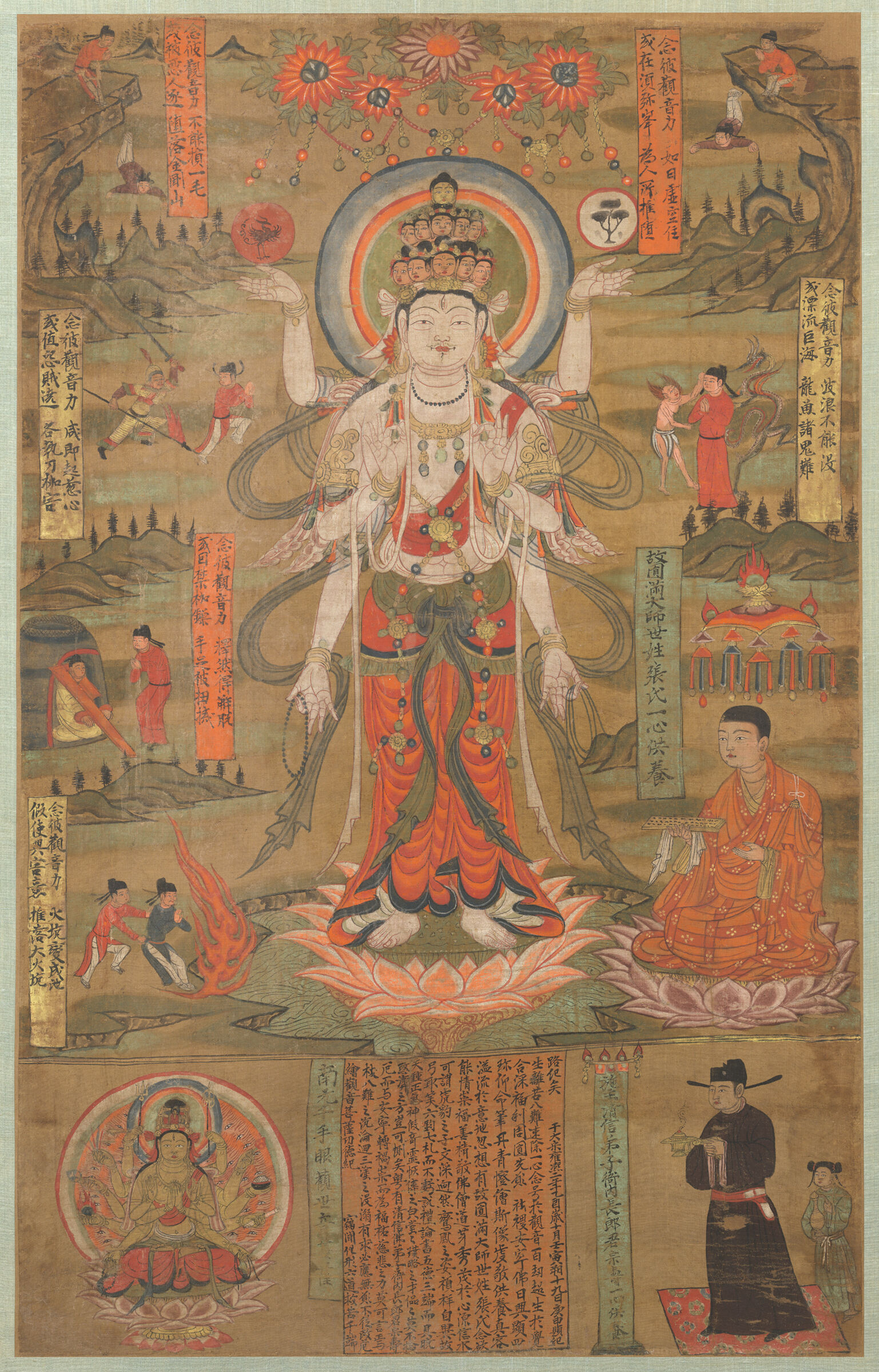
Song dynasty (960 - 1279) painting of Shiyimian Guanyin from Dunhuang in Gansu, China. Held at the Harvard Art Museum in Massachusetts, USA.

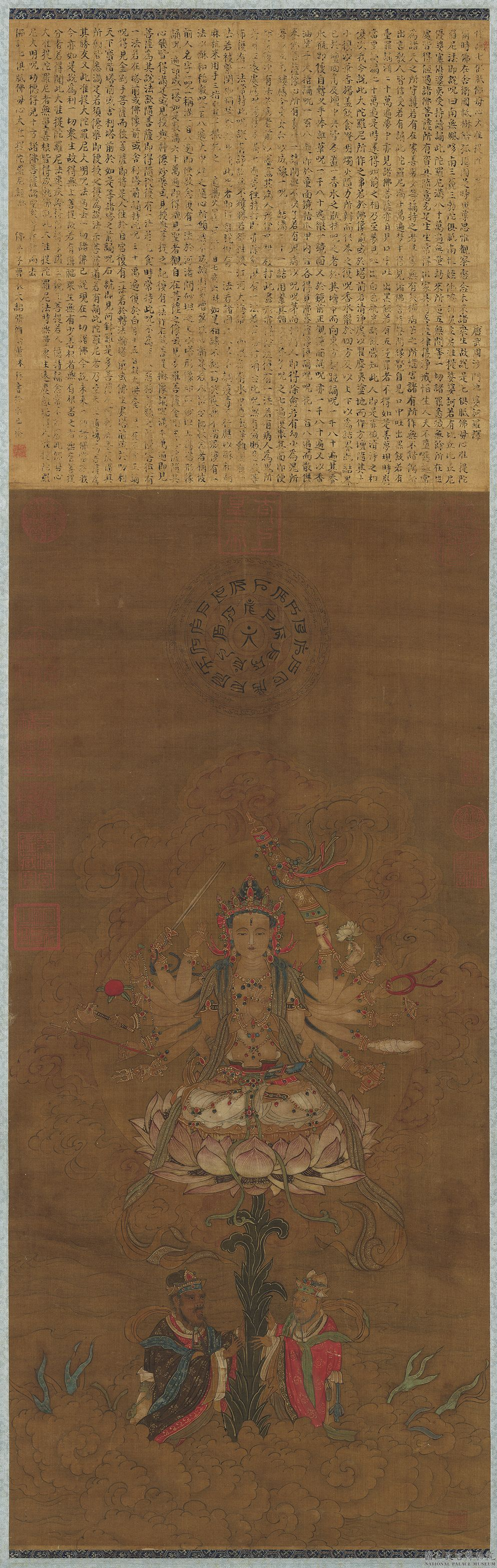
Song dynasty (960 - 1279) painting of Zhunti Guanyin. Held at the National Palace Museum in Taiwan.

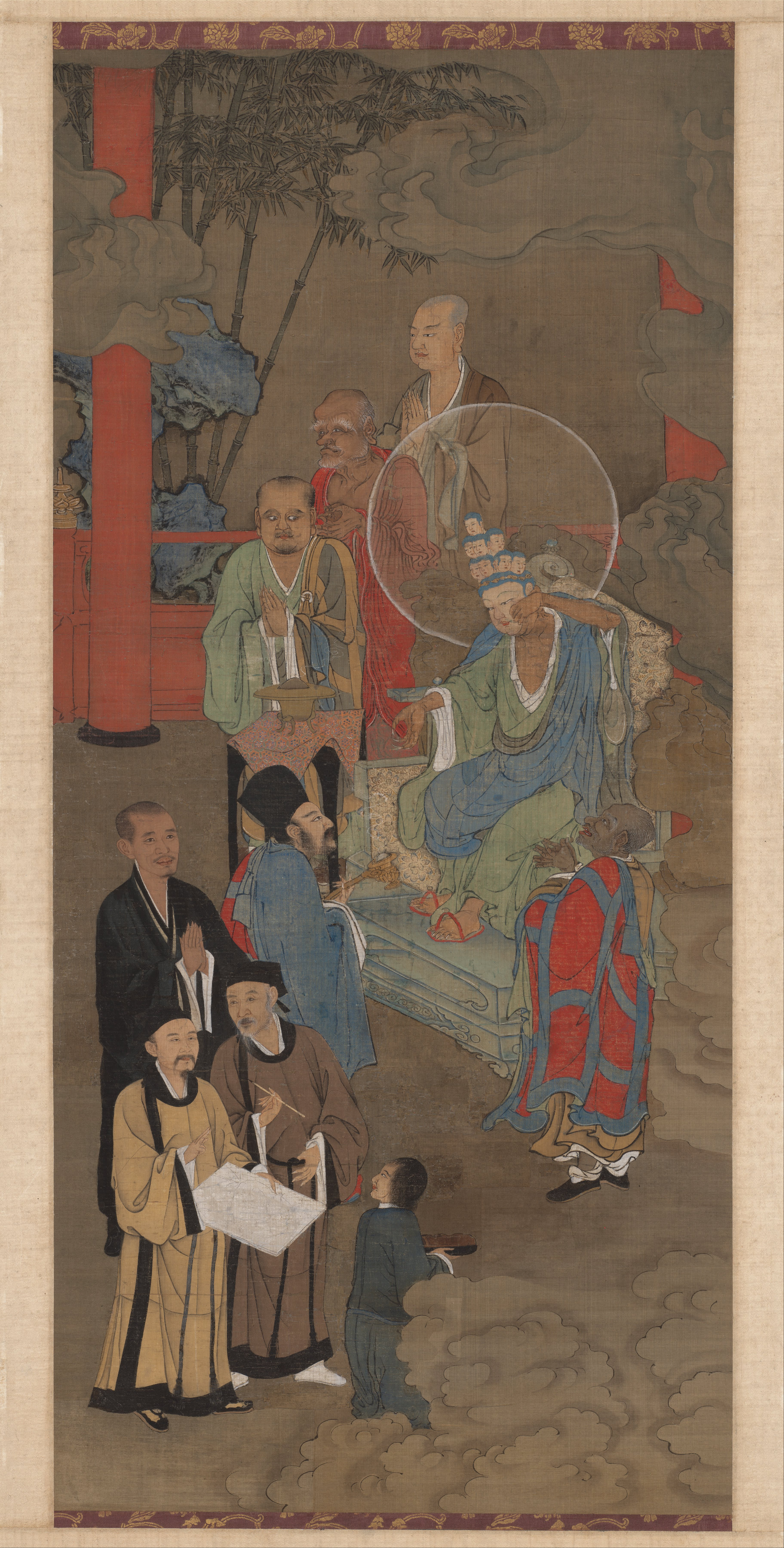
Song dynasty (960 - 1279) painting of a luohan manifesting himself as Shiyimian Guanyin by Zhou Jicheng. Latter half of 12th century. Held at the Museum of Fine Arts in Boston, Massachusetts, USA.

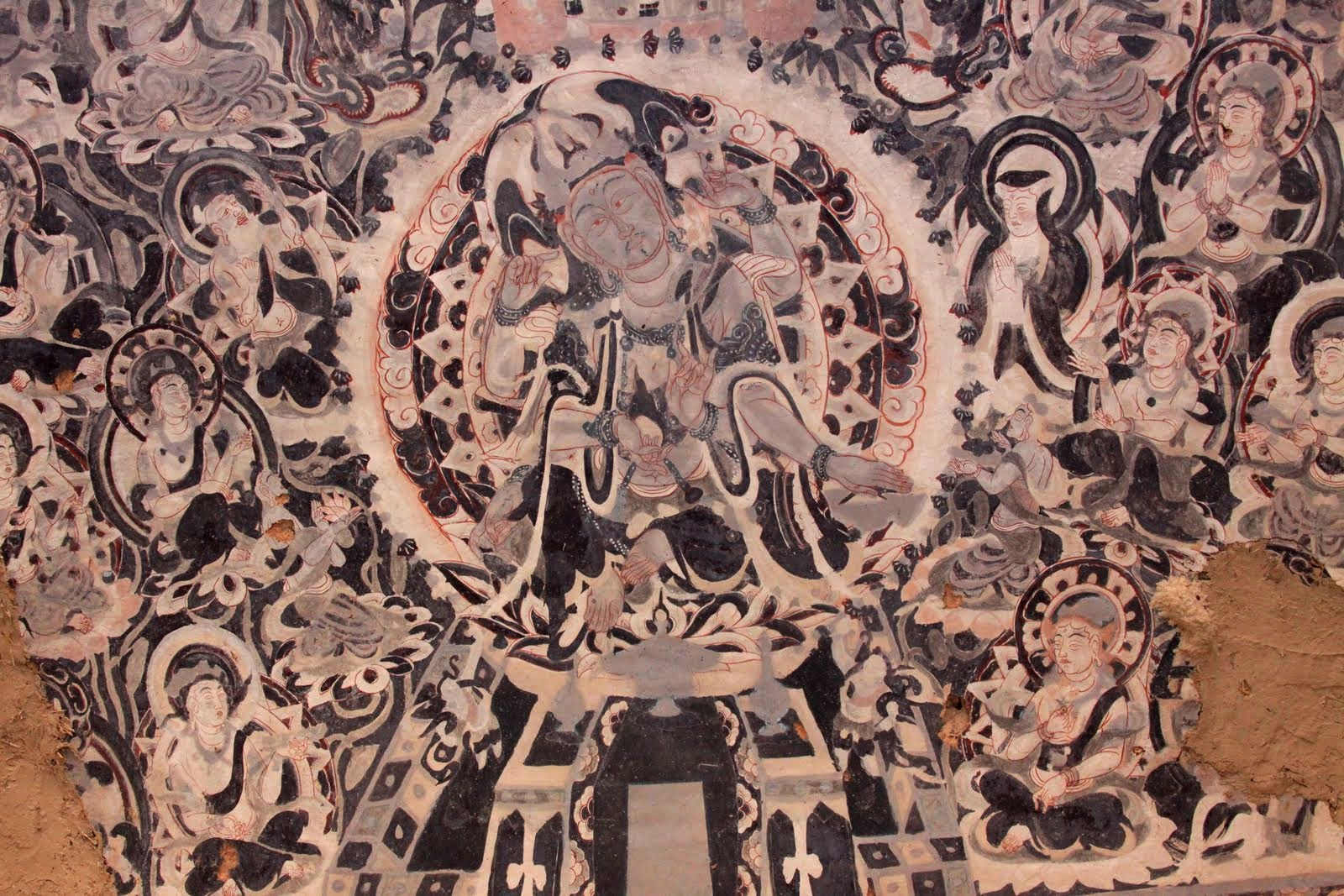
Song dynasty (960 - 1279) mural art depicting a mandala of Ruyilun Guanyin in cave 231 of the Mogao Caves at Dunhuang, Gansu, China

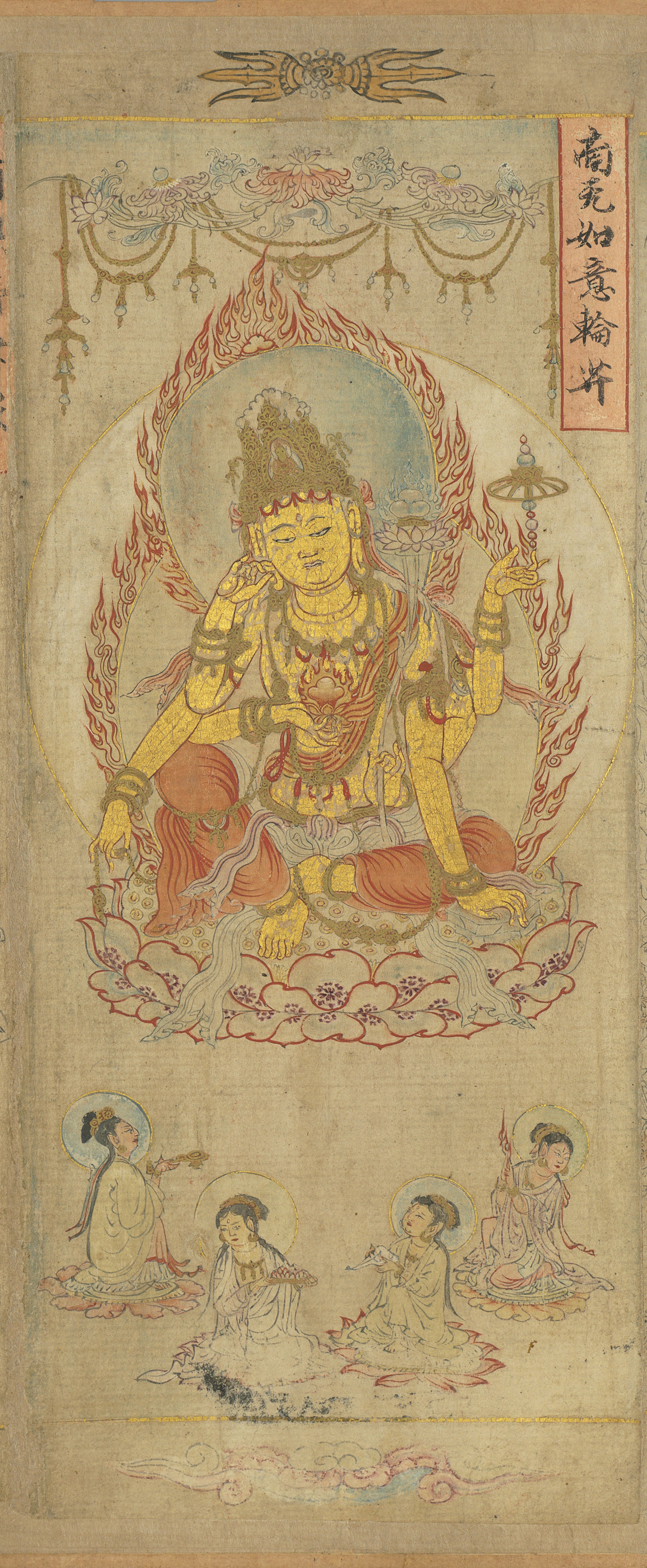
Painting of Ruyilun Guanyin, or Cintāmaṇicakra Guanyin, by Zhang Shengwen (1163–1189), a painter from Dali Kingdom in modern-day Yunnan, China.

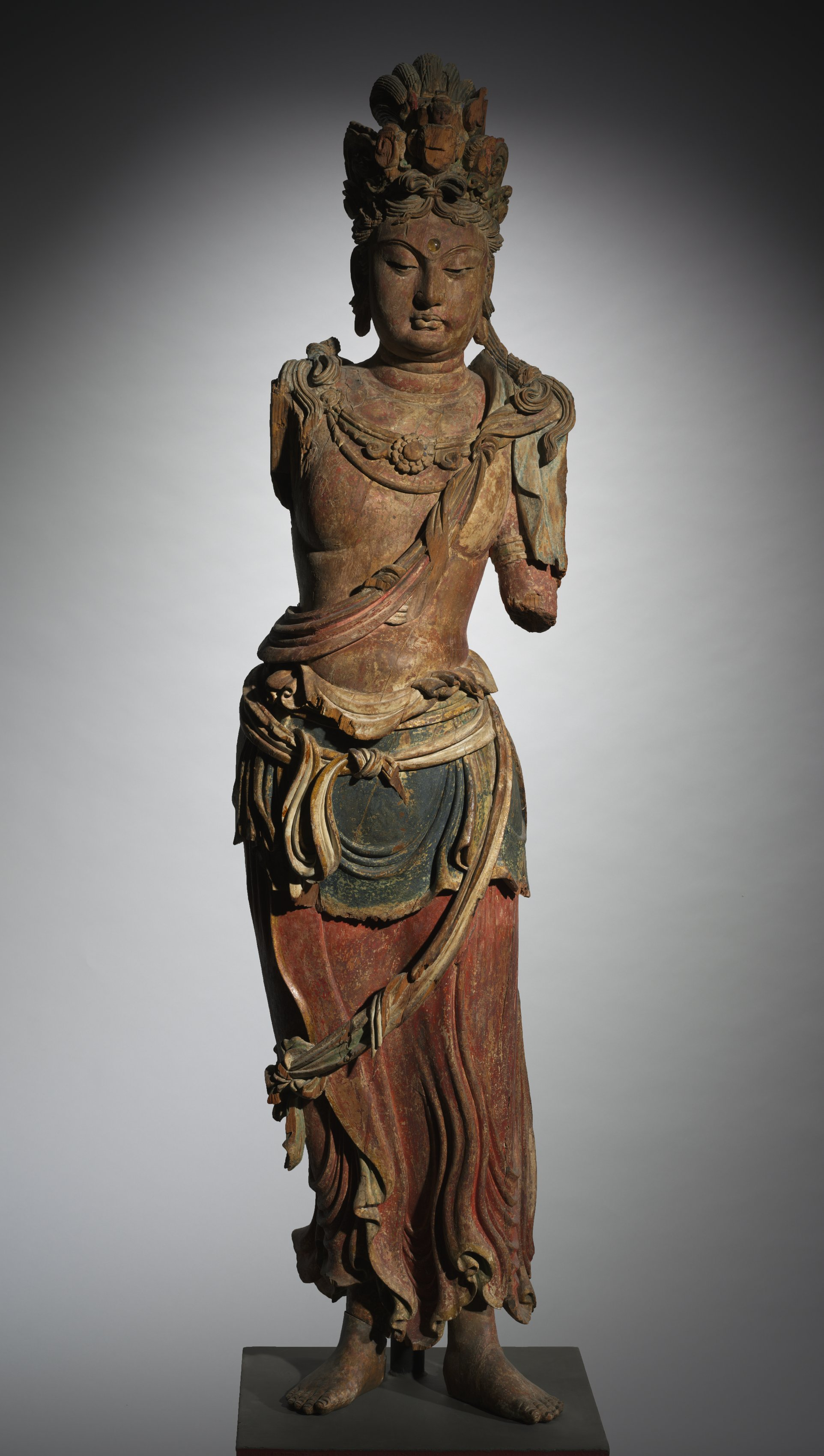
Song dynasty (960–1279) Chinese statue of Shiyimian Guanyin. Held at the Cleveland Museum of Art in Ohio, USA.

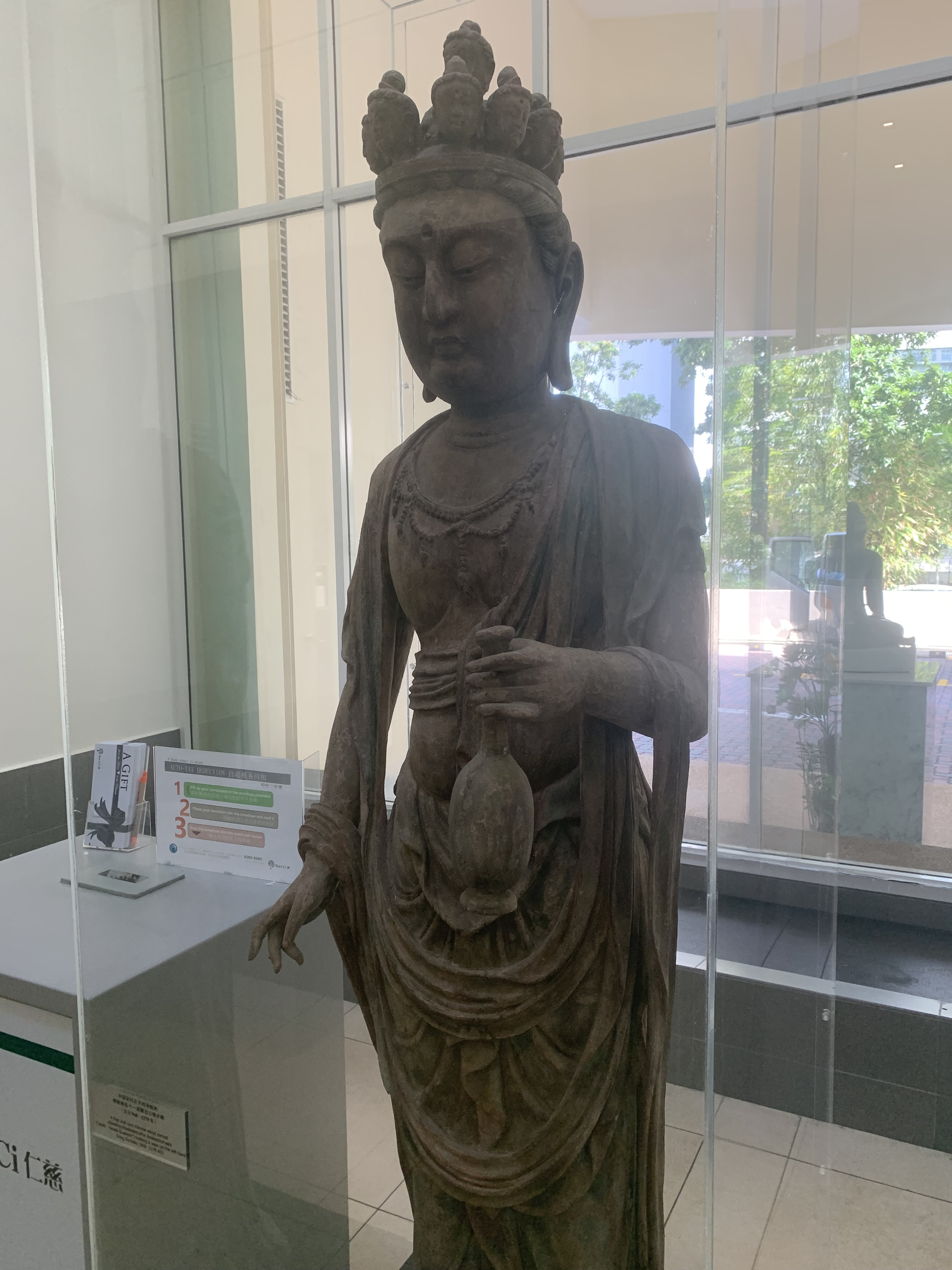
Song dynasty (960 - 1279) statue of Shiyimian Guanyin at Ren Ci Hospital in Singapore.

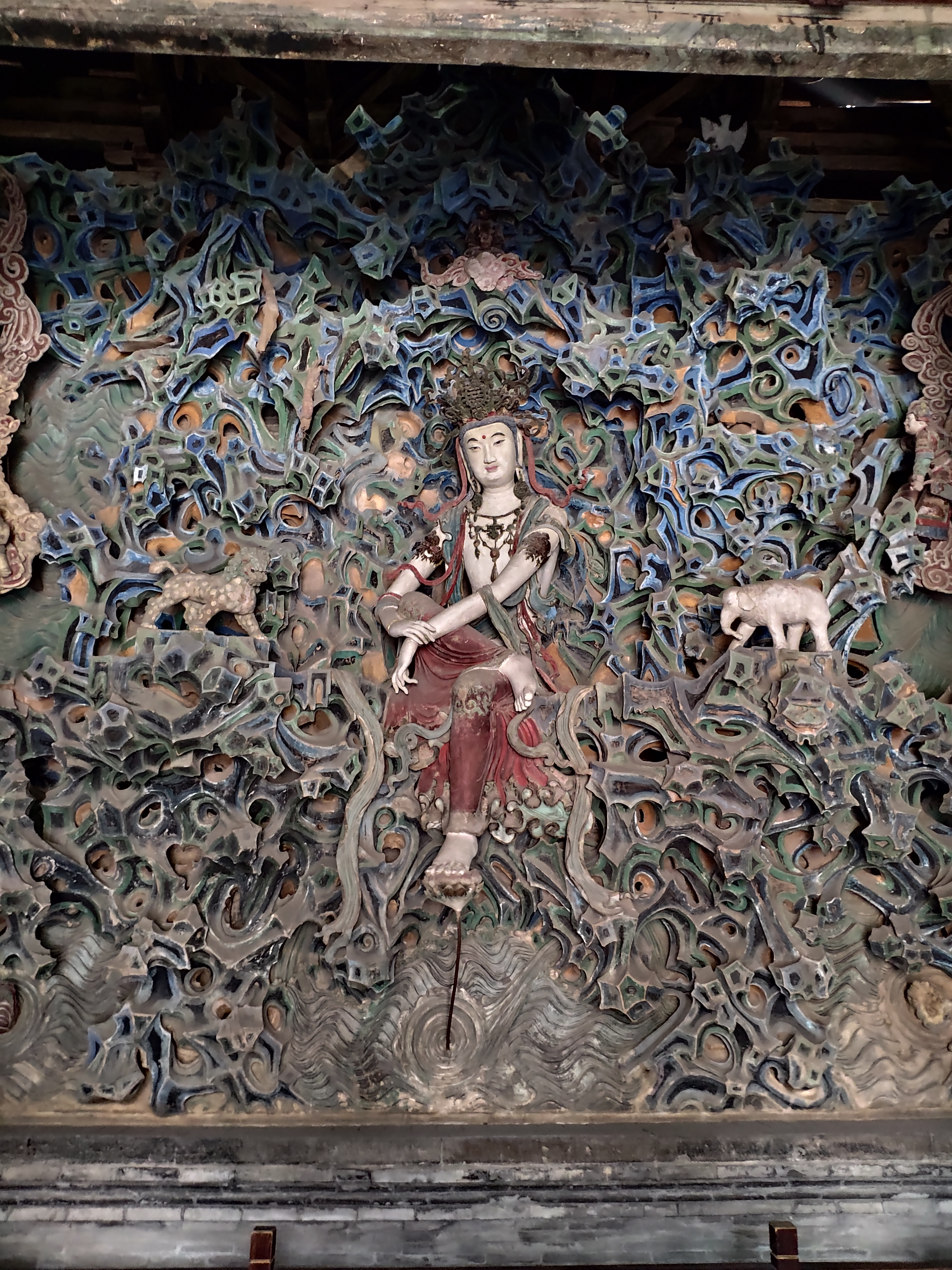
Song dynasty (960 - 1279) statue of Guanyin at the Moni Hall of Longxing Temple in Zhengding, Hebei, China

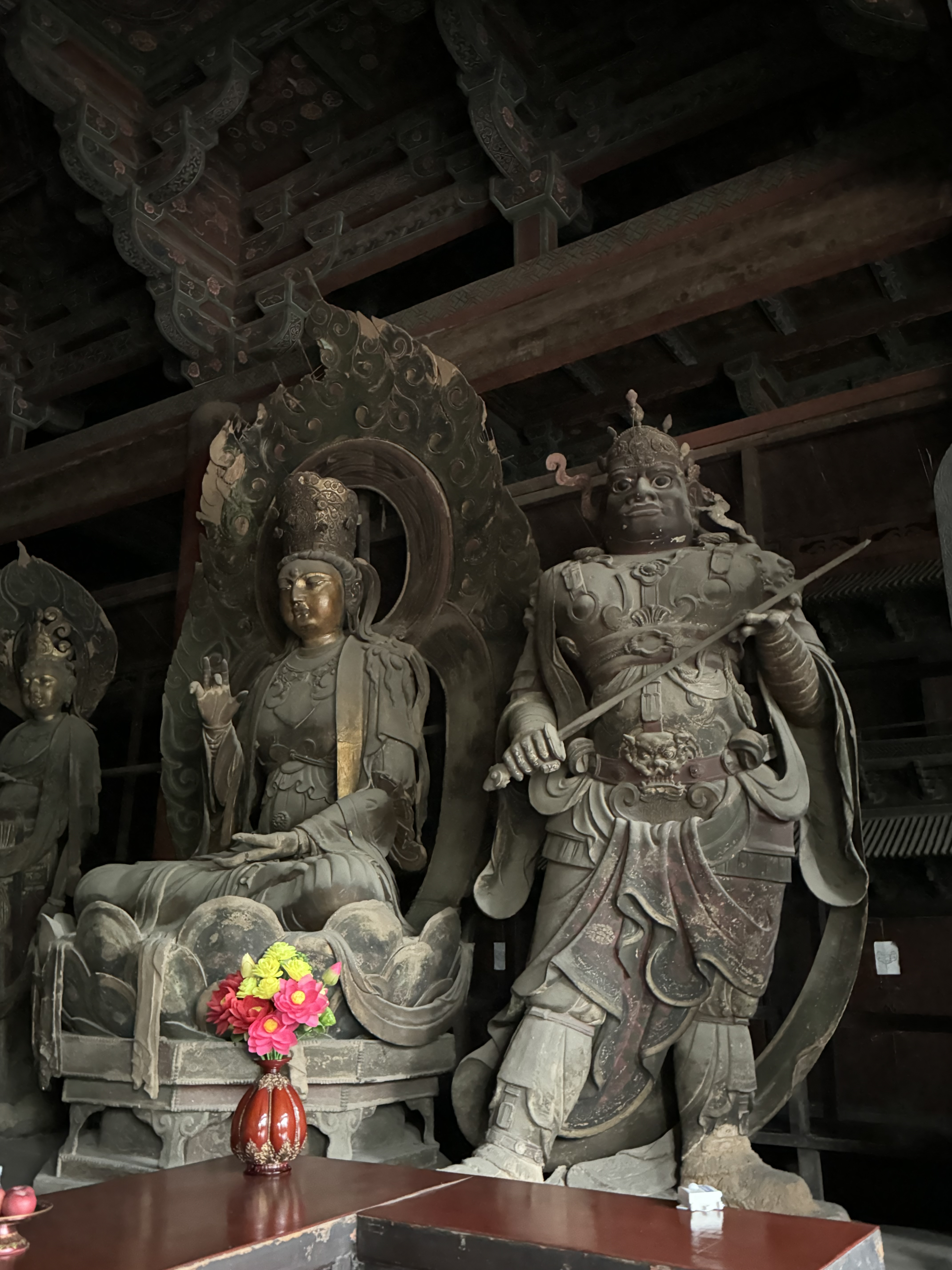
Liao dynasty (916–1125) statue of Guanyin flanked on the left by a Heavenly King at Huayan Temple in Datong, Shanxi, China.

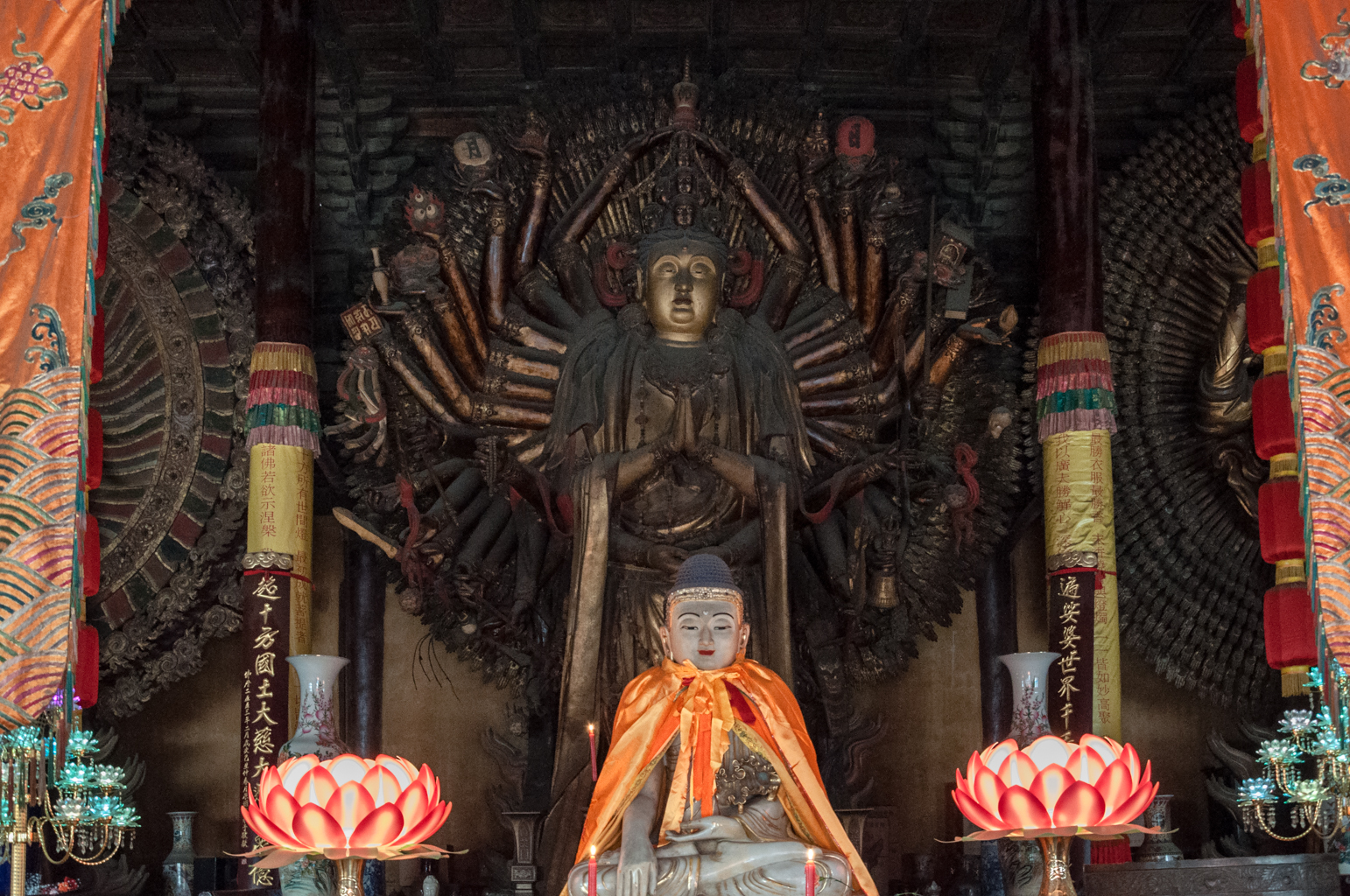
Ming dynasty (1368–1644) statue of Qianshou Guanyin at Chongshan Temple in Taiyuan, Shanxi, China.

Ming dynasty (1368–1644) statue of Guanyin at Chongfu Temple in Shuozhou, Shanxi, China.

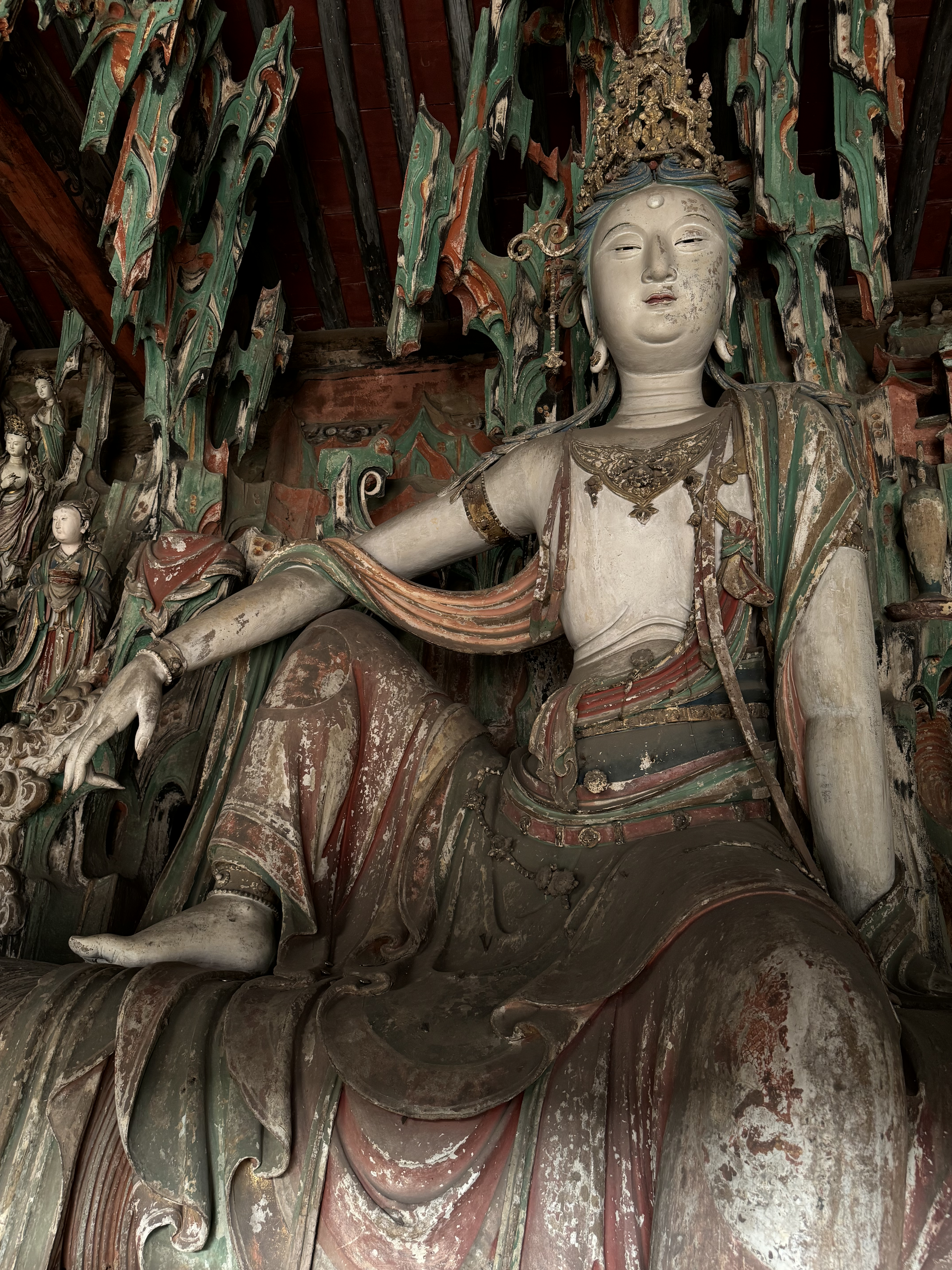
Ming dynasty (1368–1644) statue of Guanyin at Shuanglin Temple in Pingyao, Shanxi, China.

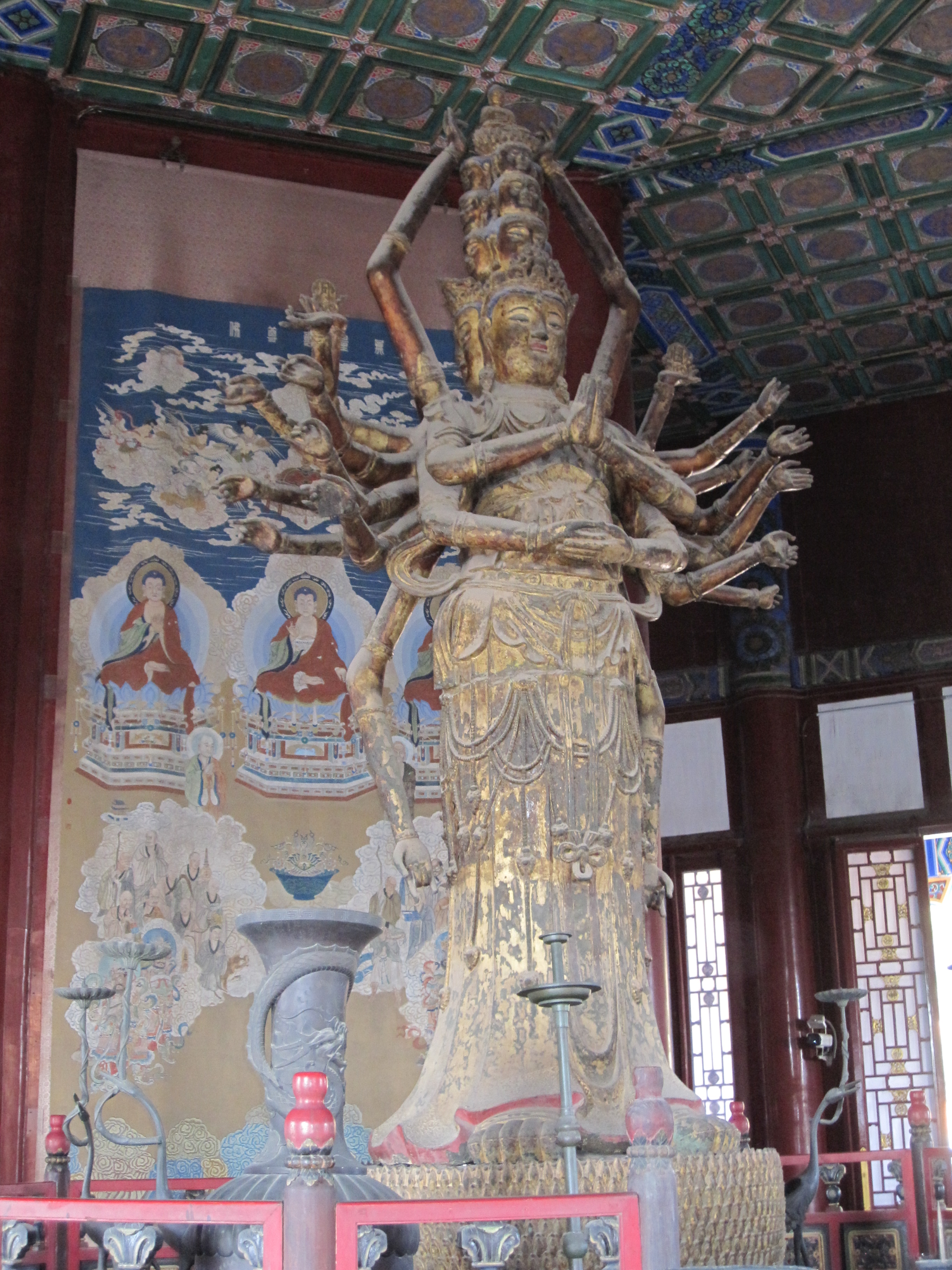
Ming dynasty (1368–1644) statue of Qianshou Qianyan Guanyin at the Foxiang Ge (Tower of Buddhist Incense) of the Summer Palace, Beijing, China.

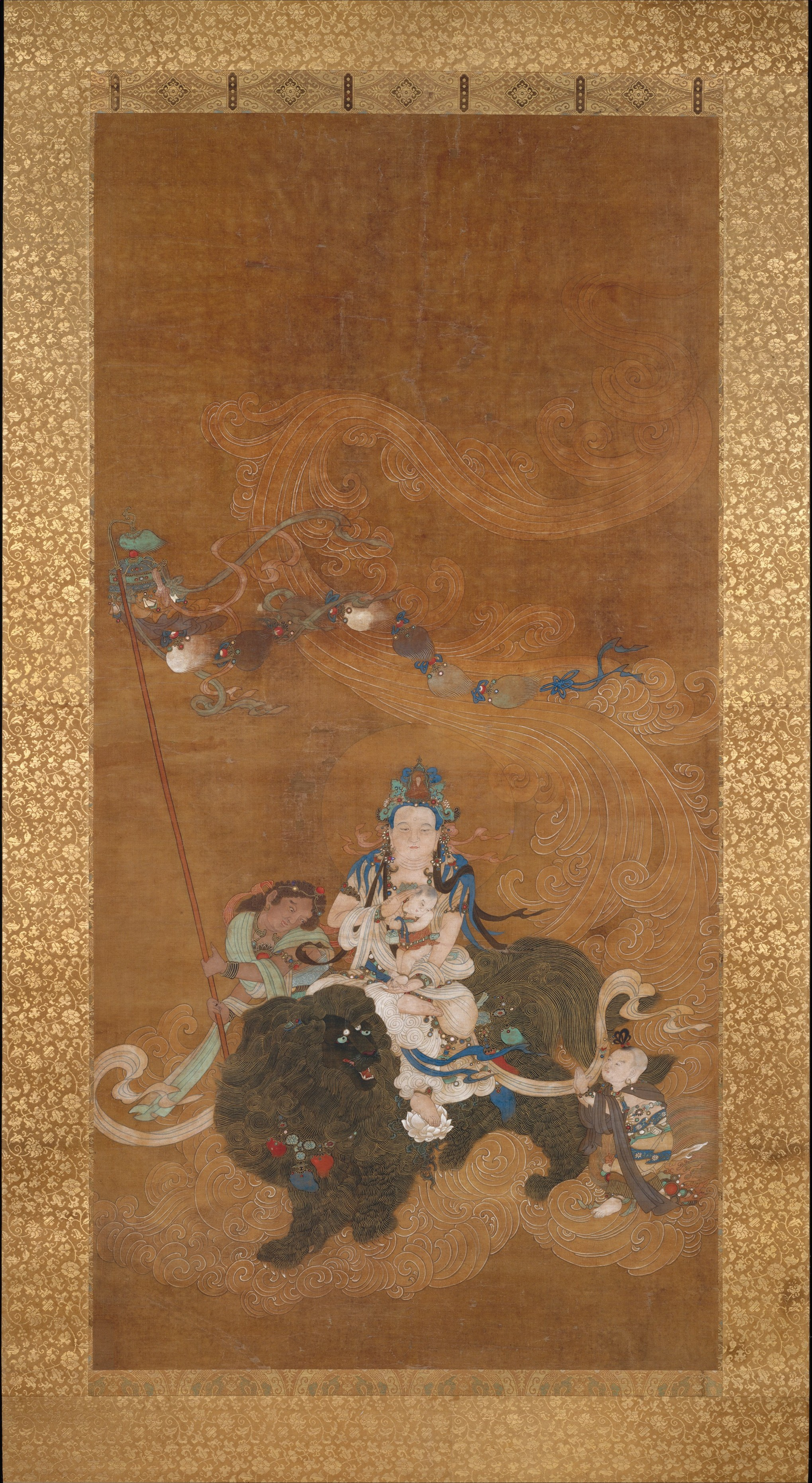
Ming dynasty (1368–1644) painting of Songzi Guanyin, or the Child-Bestowing Guanyin. Held at the Metropolitan Museum of Art in New York City, USA.

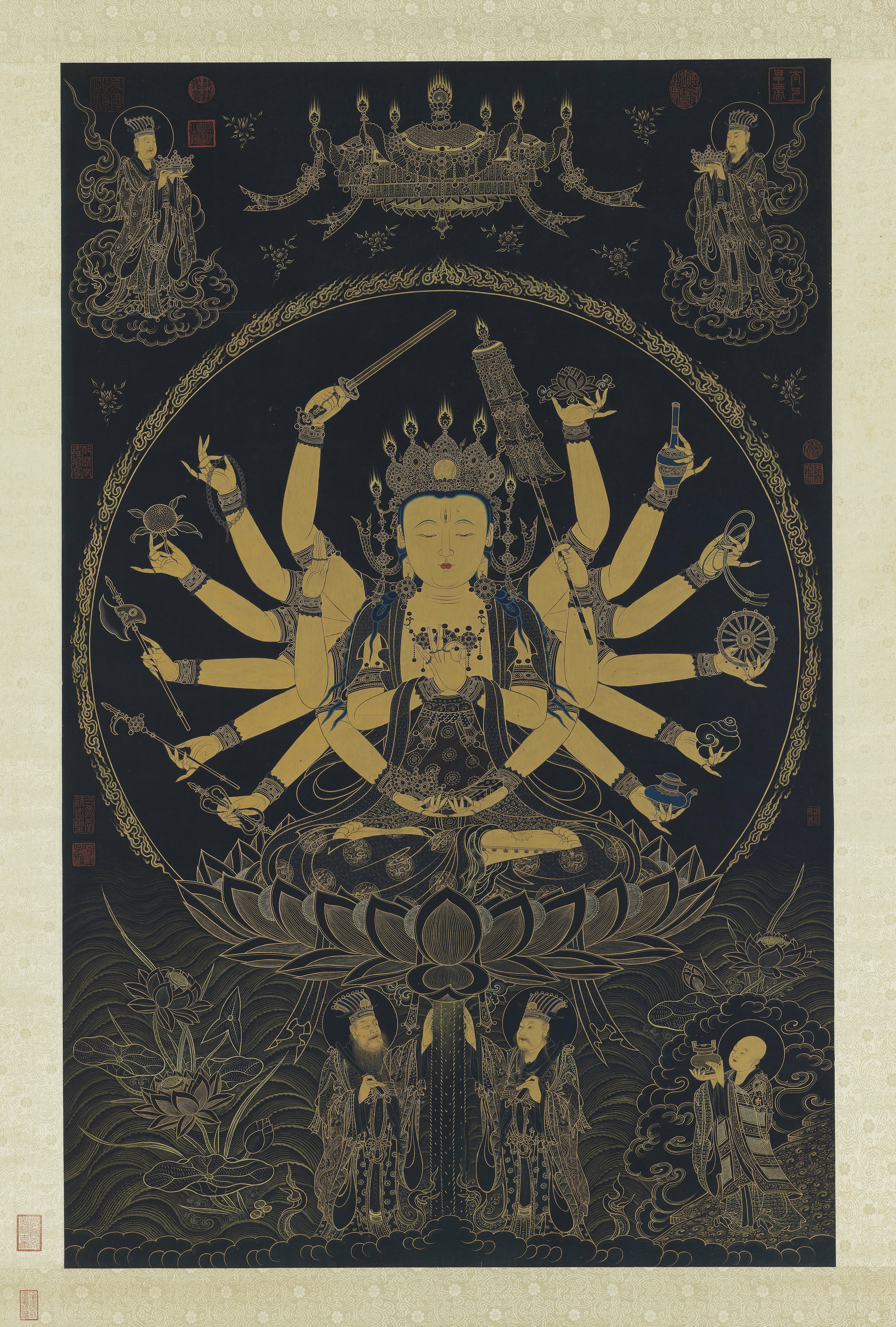
Ming Dynasty (1368–1644) hanging scroll depicting the eighteen-armed form of Zhunti Guanyin (Cundī), China.

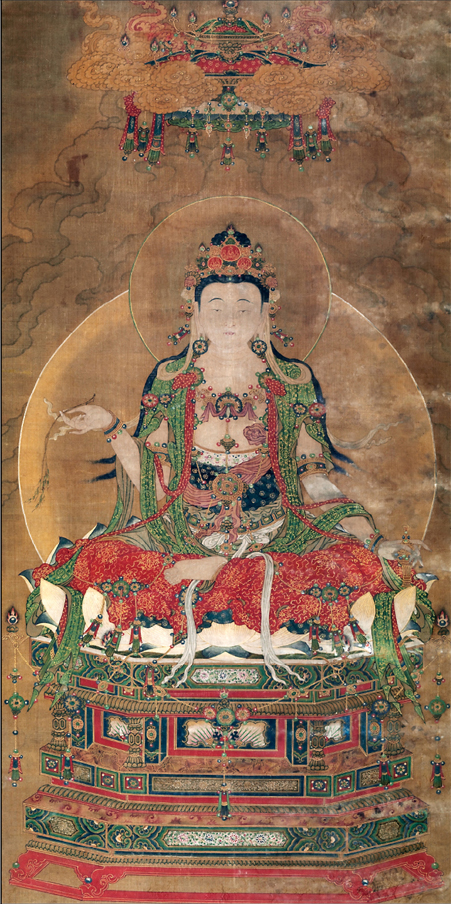
Ming dynasty (1368 - 1644) Shuilu ritual painting of Guanyin from Baoning Temple in Shanxi, China. Shuilu ritual painting are a style of paintings depicting Buddhist figures that are used in the eponymous Shuilu Fahui ceremony.

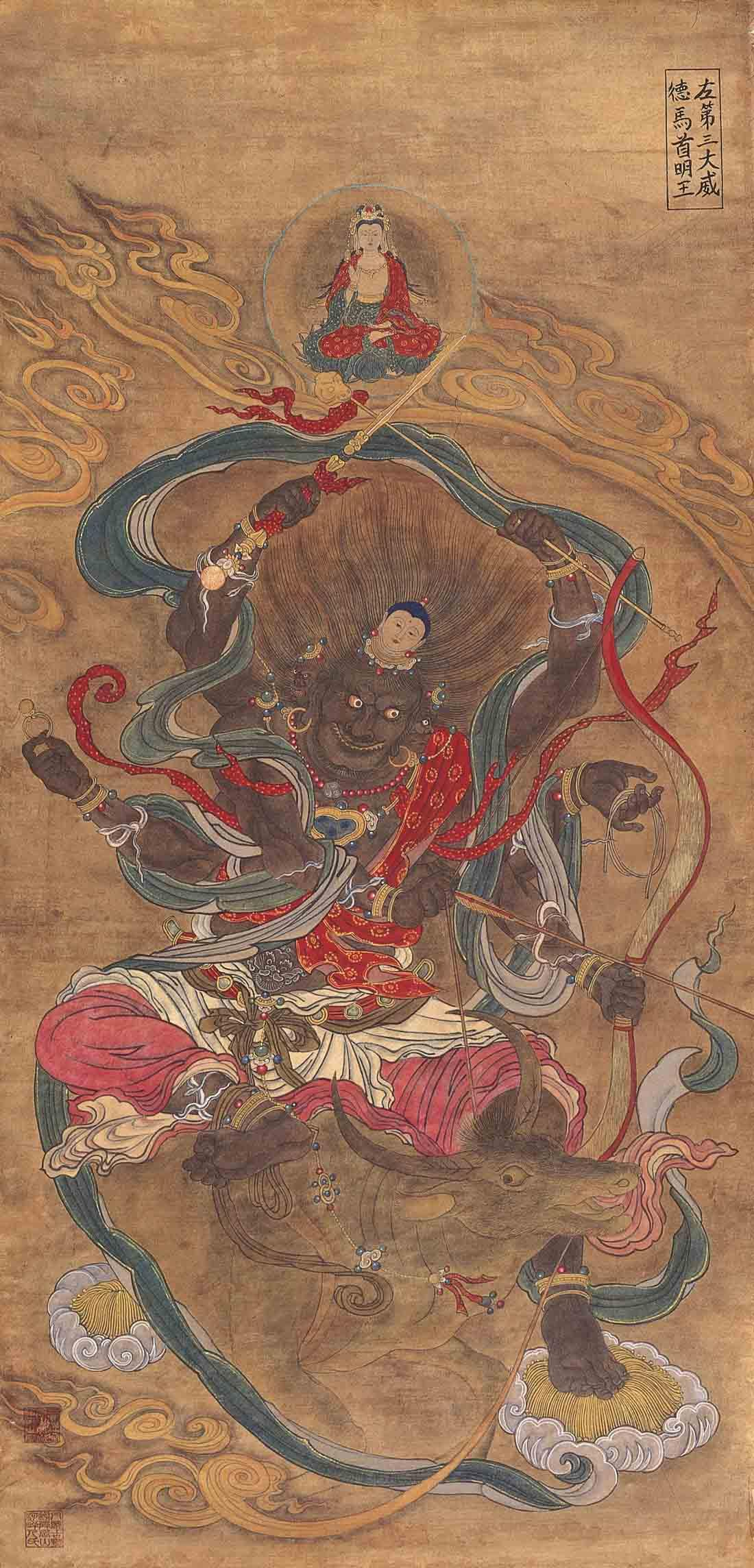
Ming dynasty (1368 - 1644) Shuilu ritual painting of Matou Guanyin, or Hayagriva, one out of a set depicting the Ten Wisdom Kings, from Baoning Temple in Shanxi, China.

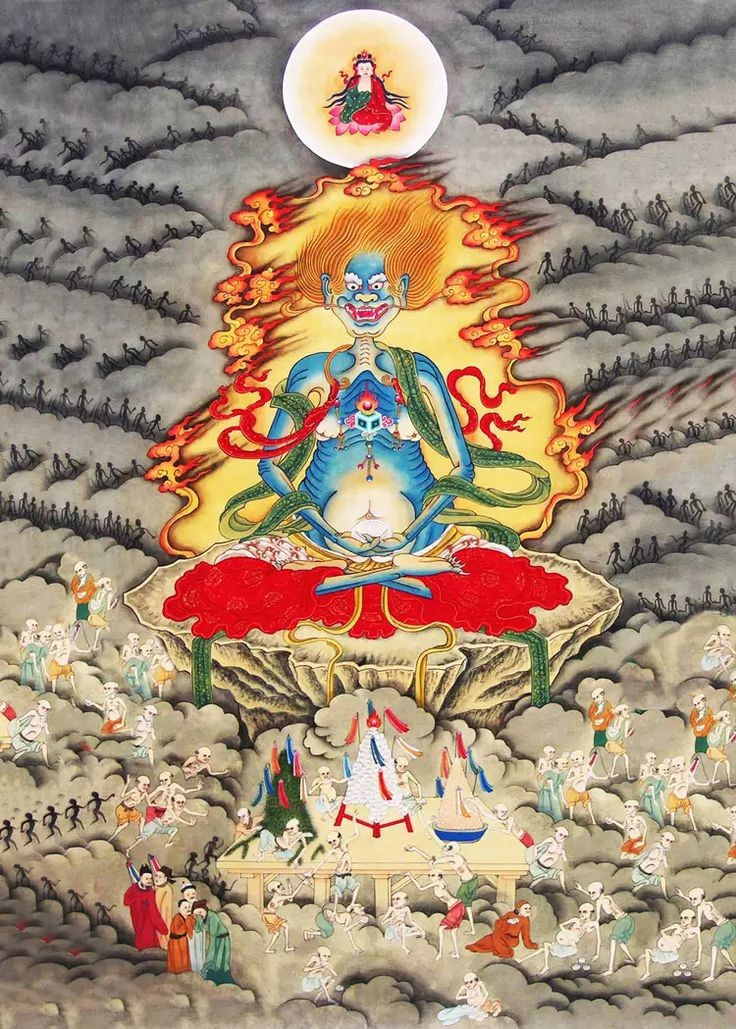
Ming dynasty (1368 - 1644) Shuilu ritual painting of Mianran Dashi, a manifestation of Guanyin as a hungry ghost king from Baoning Temple in Shanxi, China.

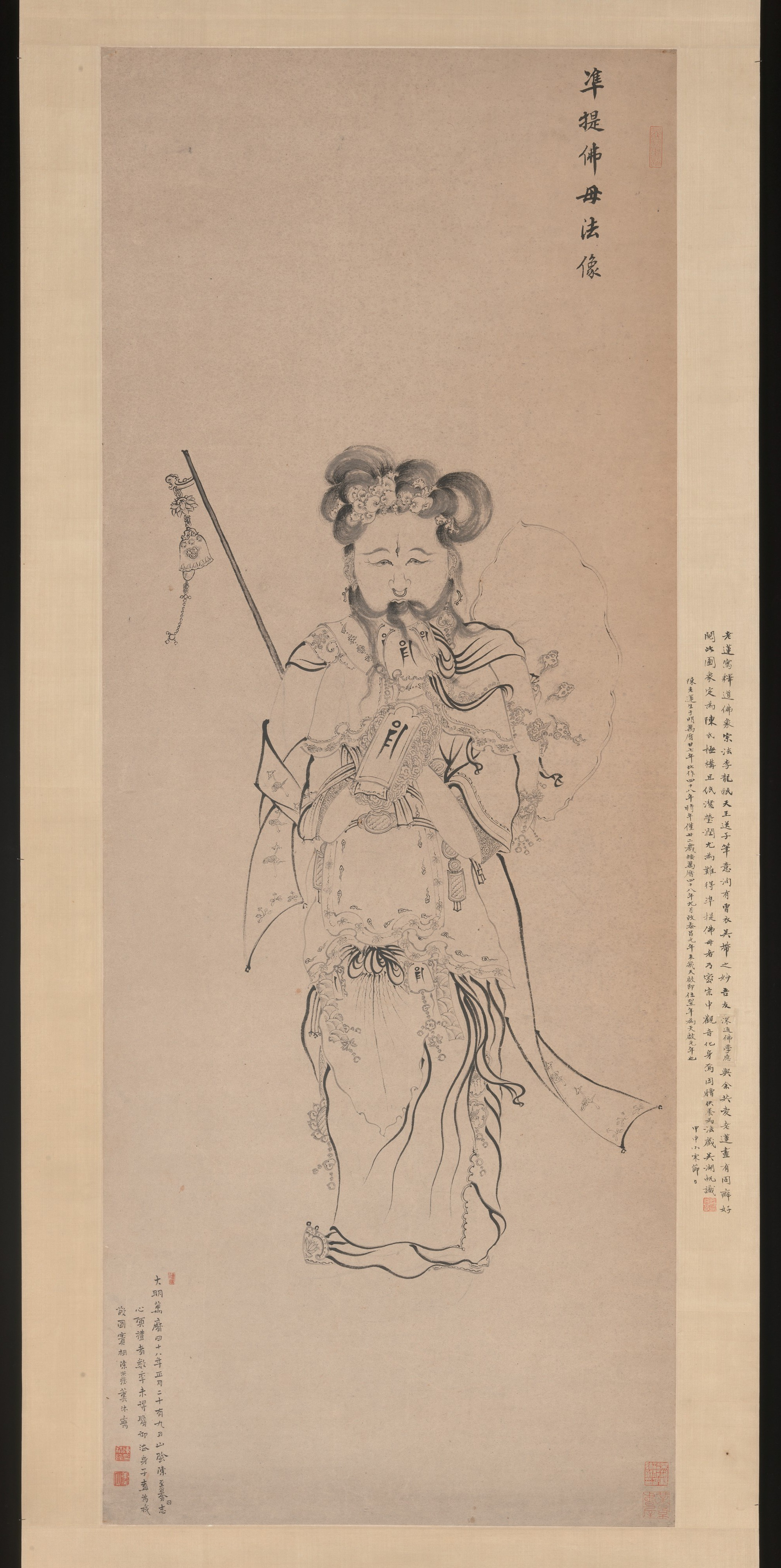
Ming dynasty (1368–1644) painting of Zhunti Guanyin by Chen Hongshou. Titled "Bodhisattva Guanyin in the Form of the Buddha-Mother", with Buddha-Mother being a popular epithet for Zhunti. Dated 1620. Held at the Metropolitan Museum of Art in New York City, USA.

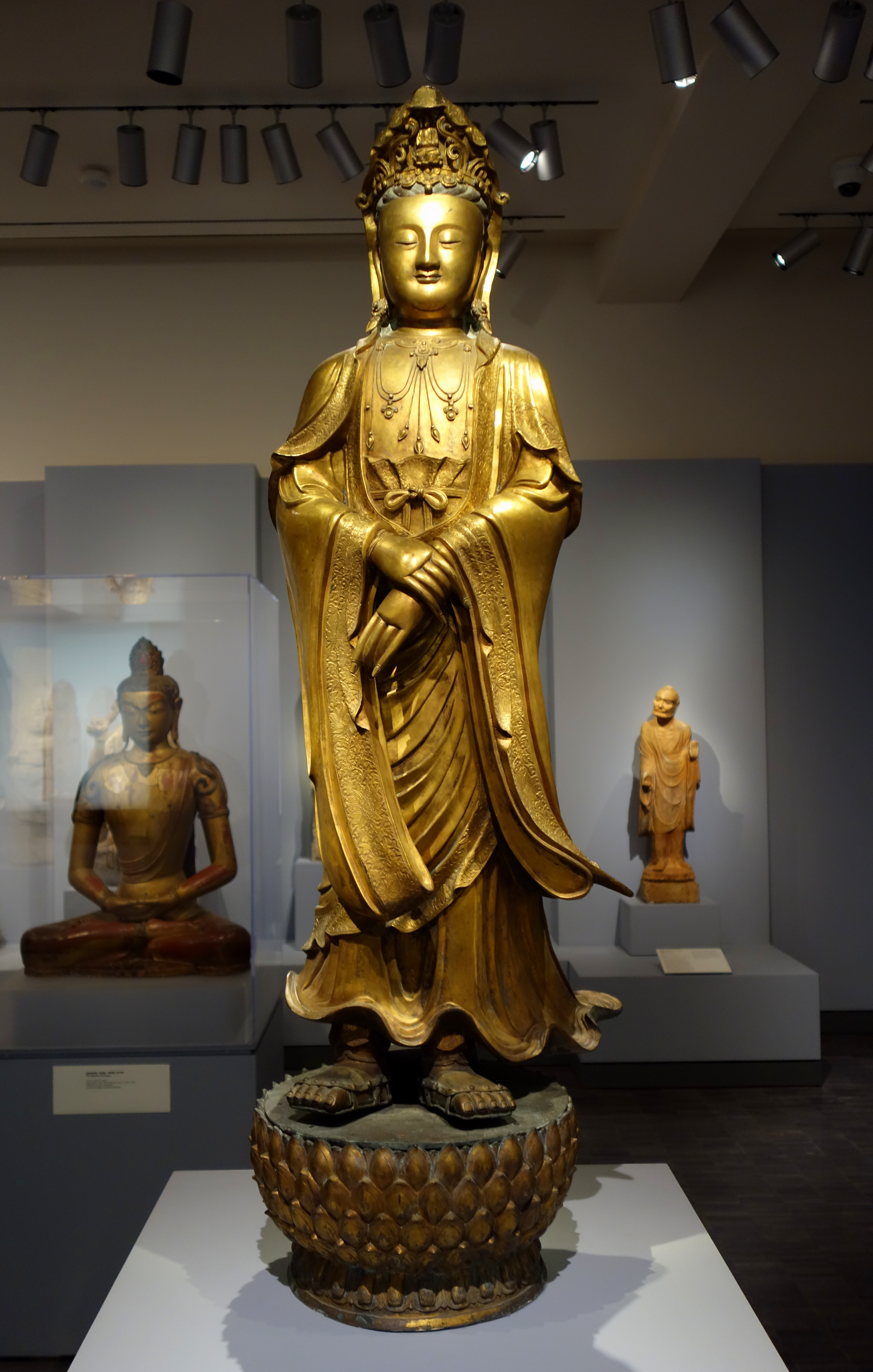
Ming or Qing dynasty bronze statue of Guanyin. Cast sometime in the 17th century. Held at the Asian Art Museum in San Francisco, California, China.

Qing dynasty (1644–1912) painting of Guanyin by Ding Guanpeng. 18th century. Titled "Mahāsattva seated on a lotus".

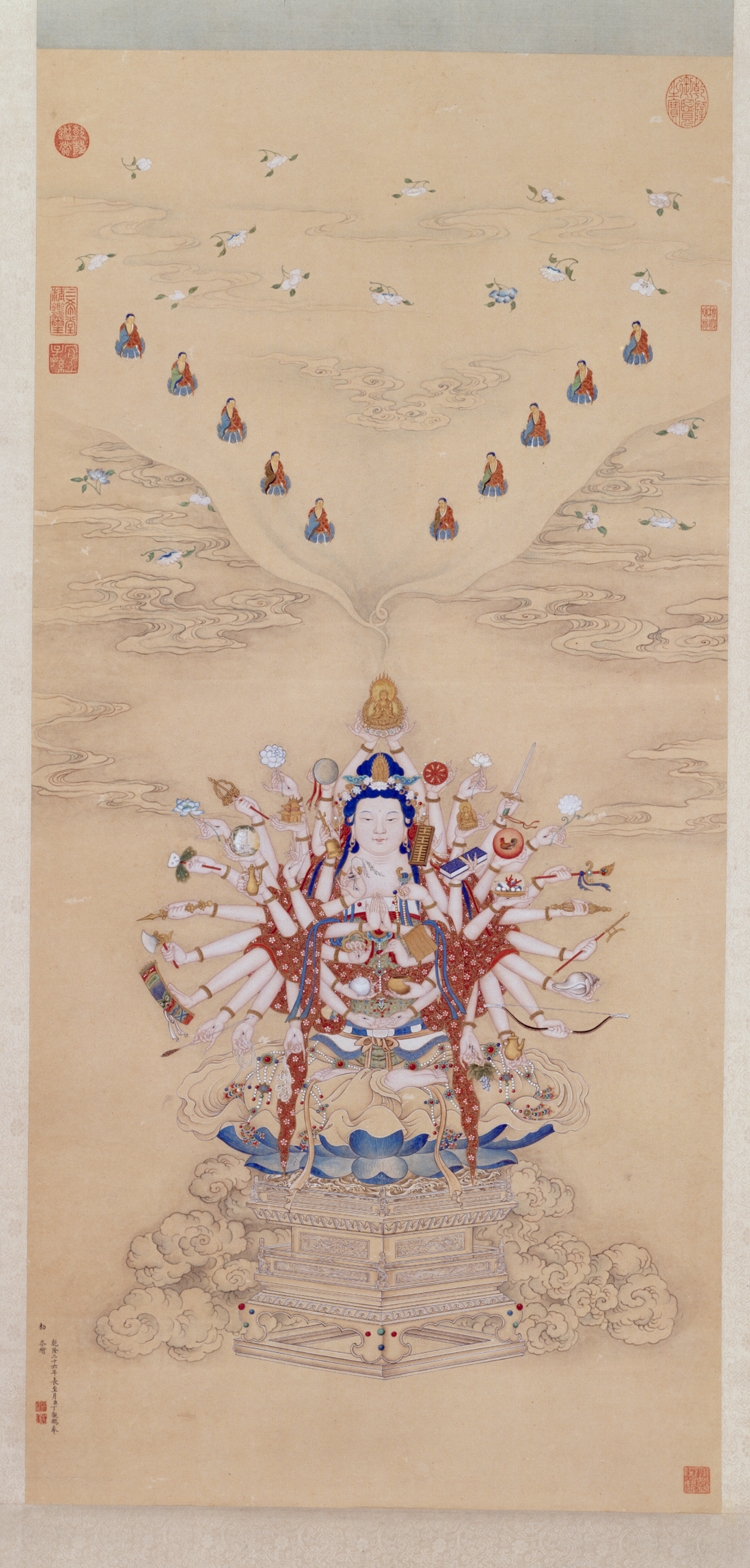
Qing dynasty (1644–1912) painting of Qianshou Guanyin by Ding Guanpeng. 18th century. Titled "Jewelled countenance of Guanyin".

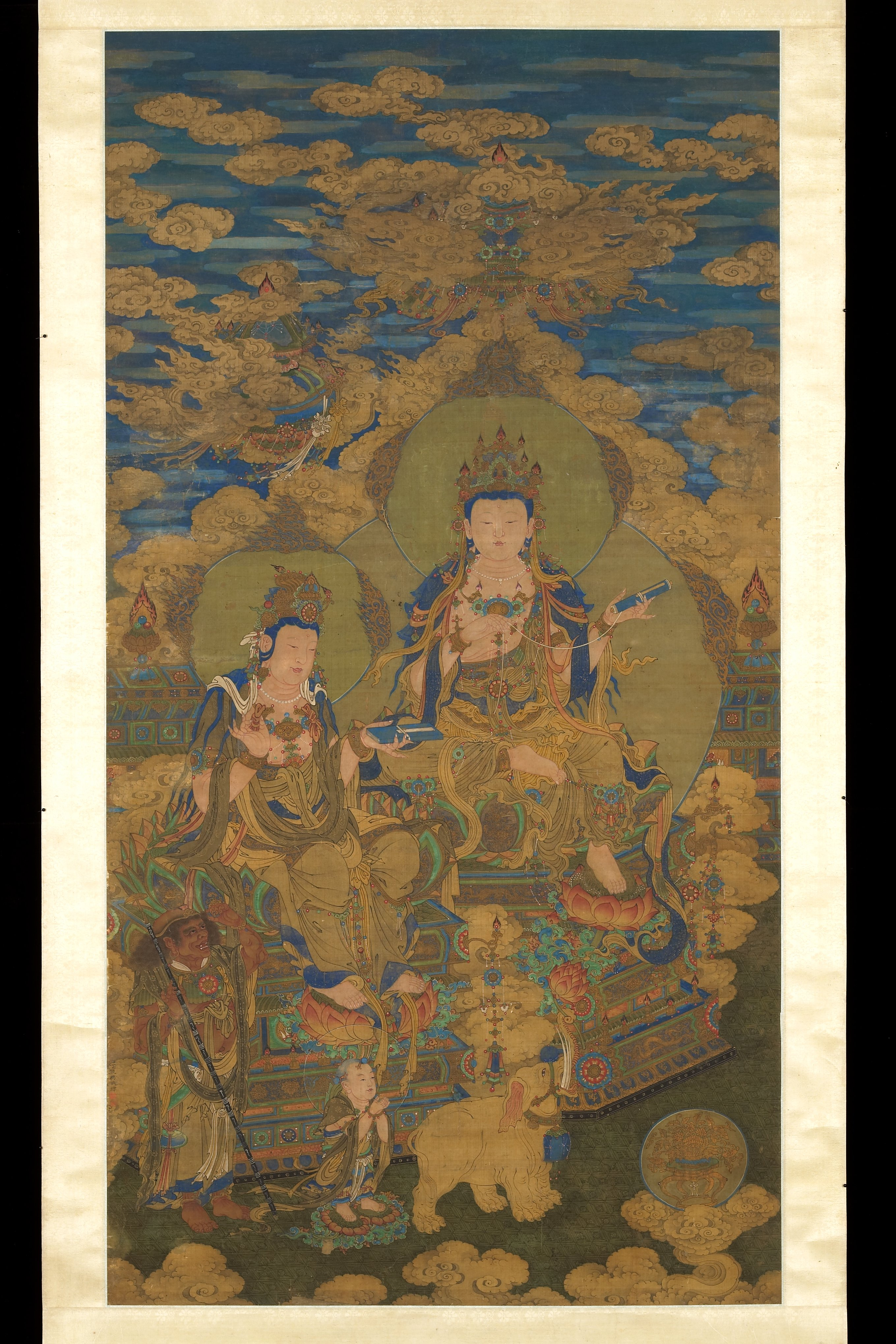
Qing dynasty (1644–1912) painting of two manifestations of Guanyin by Ding Guanpeng. 1750. The painting depicts two versions of Guanyin, each attired in silk and jewelry and holding sutras while seated in the position of "royal ease" atop elaborate pedestals. In the foreground are an arhat carrying a walking staff, the child prodigy Shancai seeking spiritual council, and a six-tusk white elephant, all paying homage to Buddhist thought.

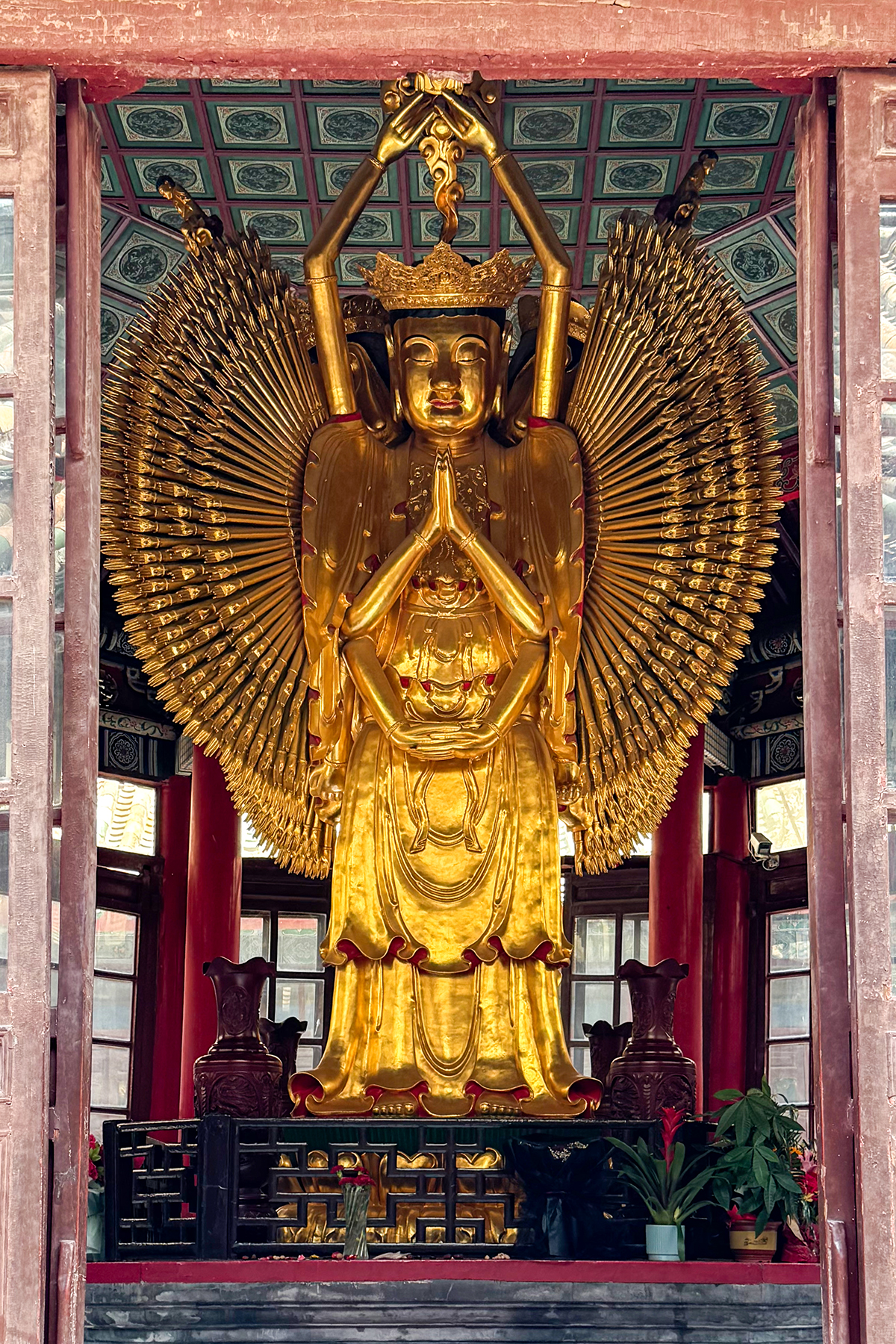
Qing dynasty (1644–1912) statue of Qianshou Qianyan Guanyin at Daxiangguo Temple, Kaifeng, Henan, China. Carved during the reign of the Qianlong Emperor (1735–1796), the statue consists of four front profiles of Guanyin, facing each of the four directions.

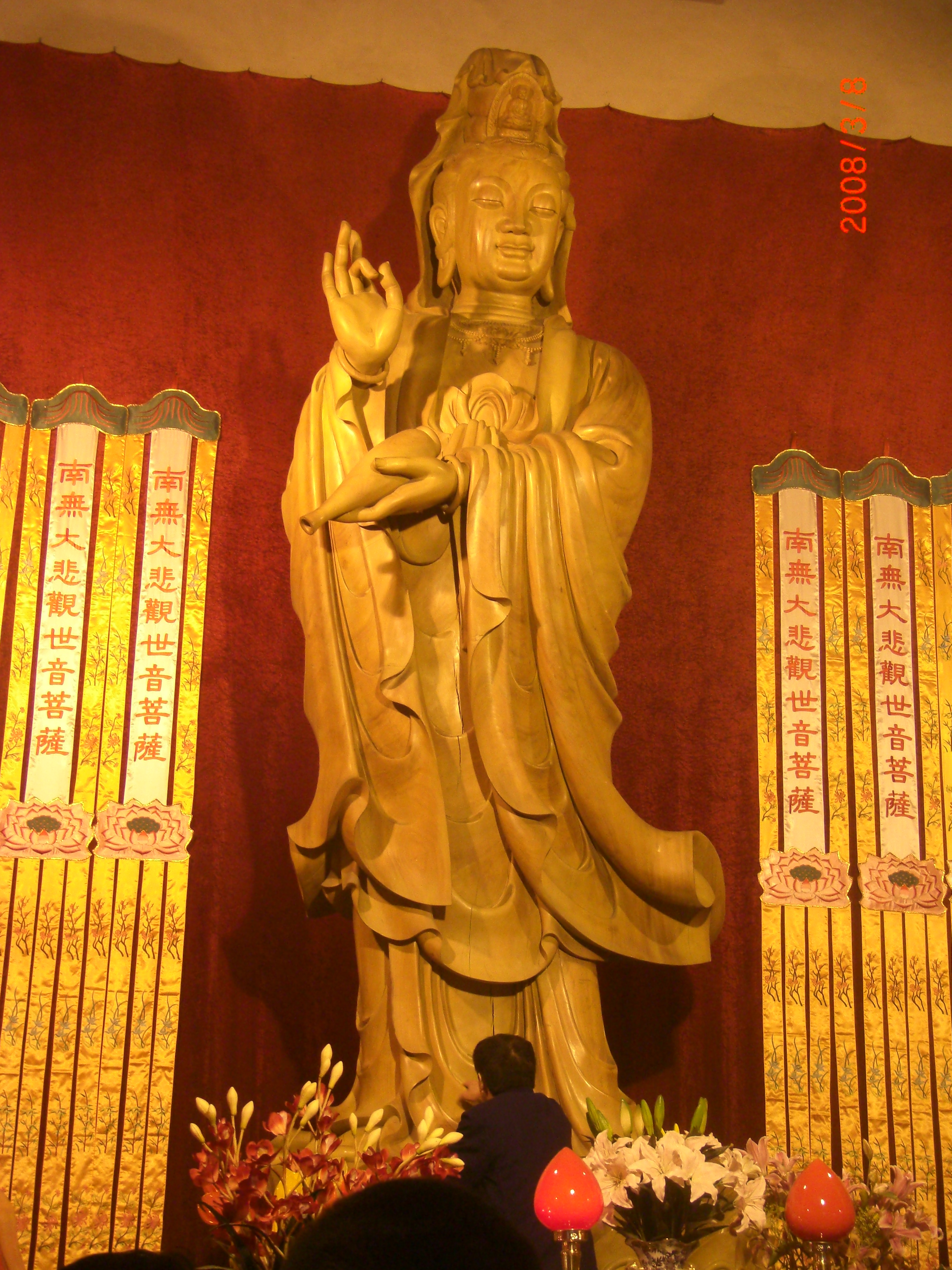
Statue of Guanyin at the Guanyin dian of Jing'an Temple, a temple which practices Chinese Esoteric Buddhism, in Shanghai, China.

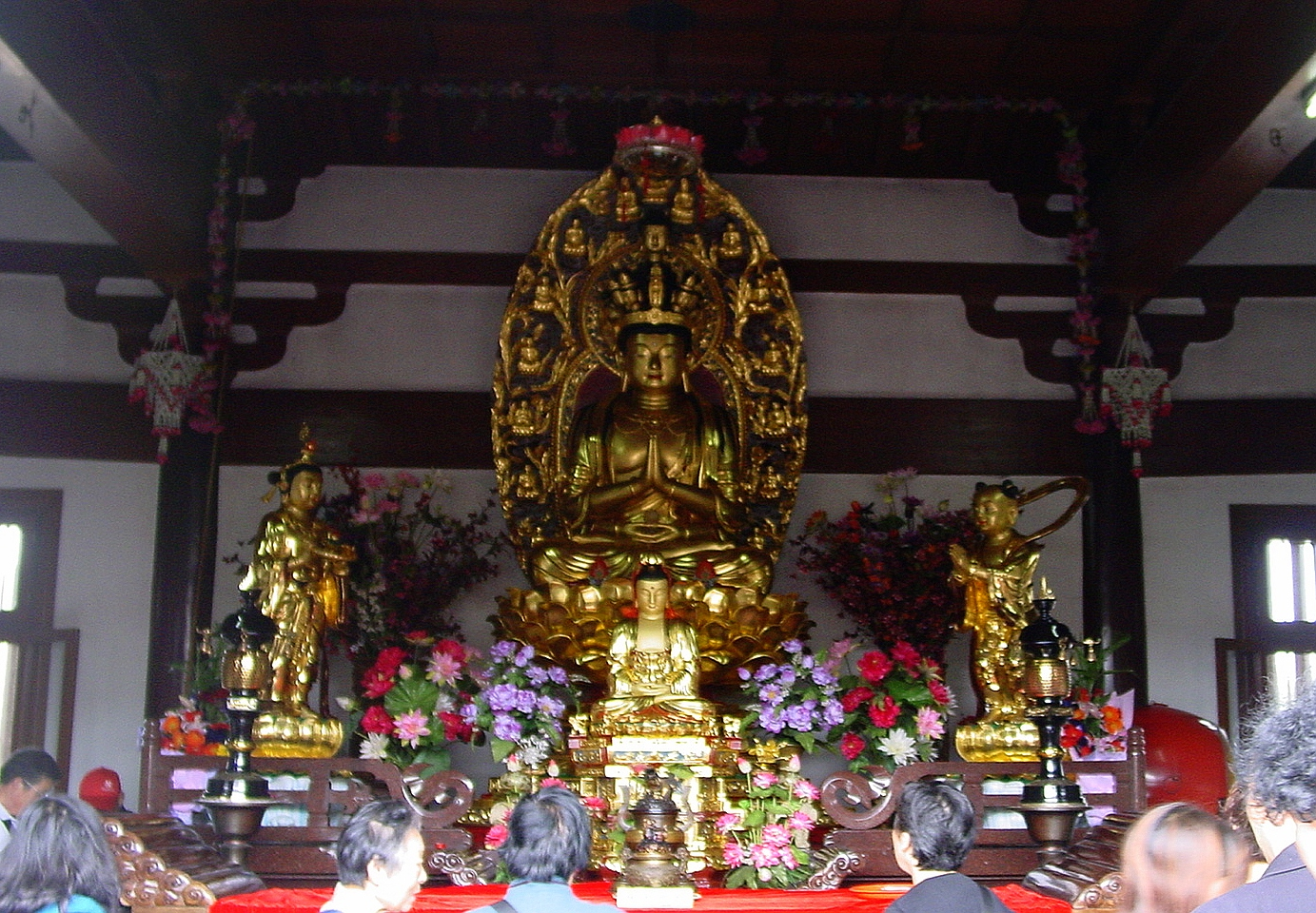
Statue of Shiyimian Guanyin in Bukenqu Guanyin Temple in Putuoshan, Zhejiang, China.

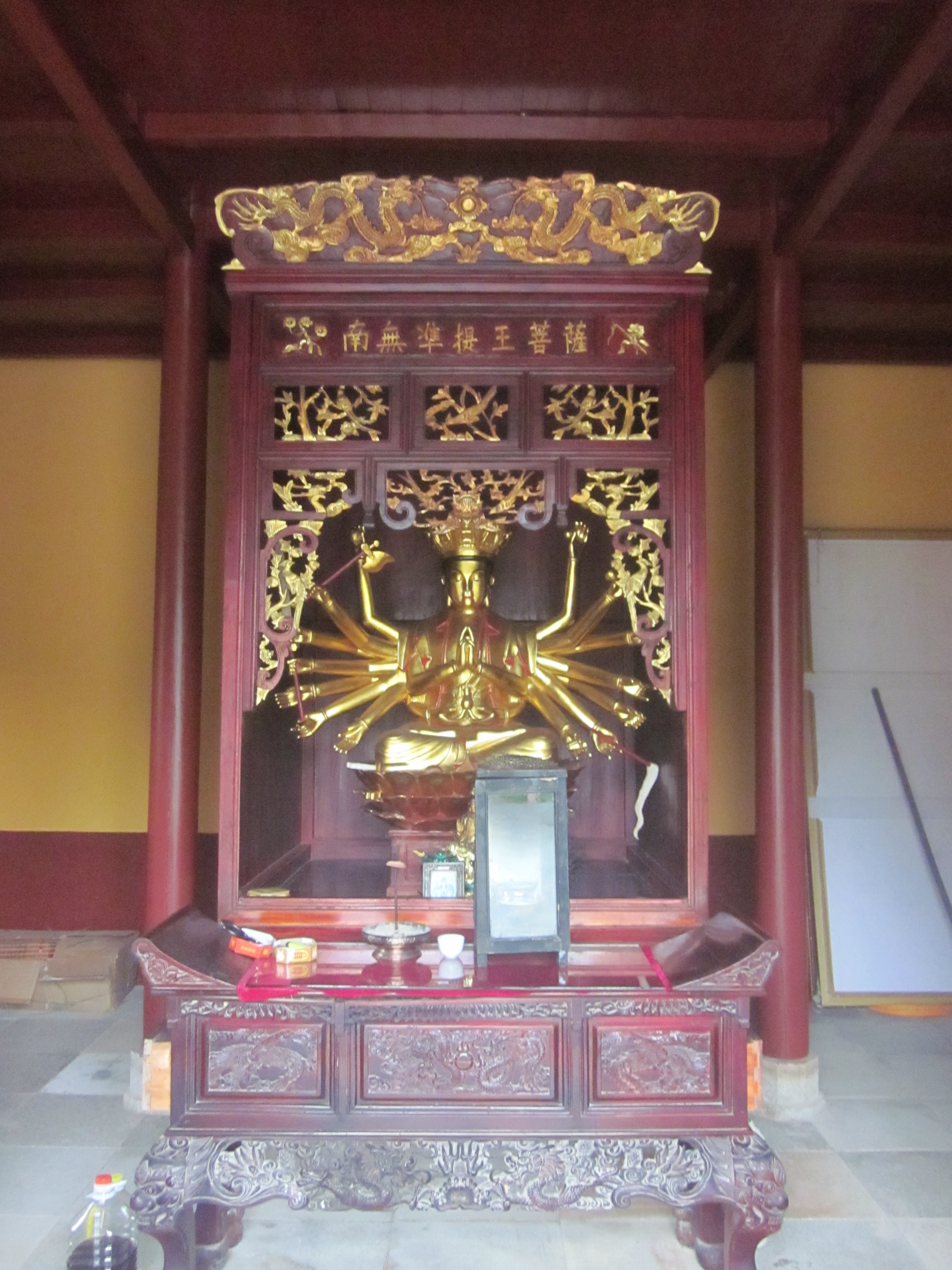
Statue of Zhunti Guanyin in Shishuang Temple in Liuyang, Hunan, China.

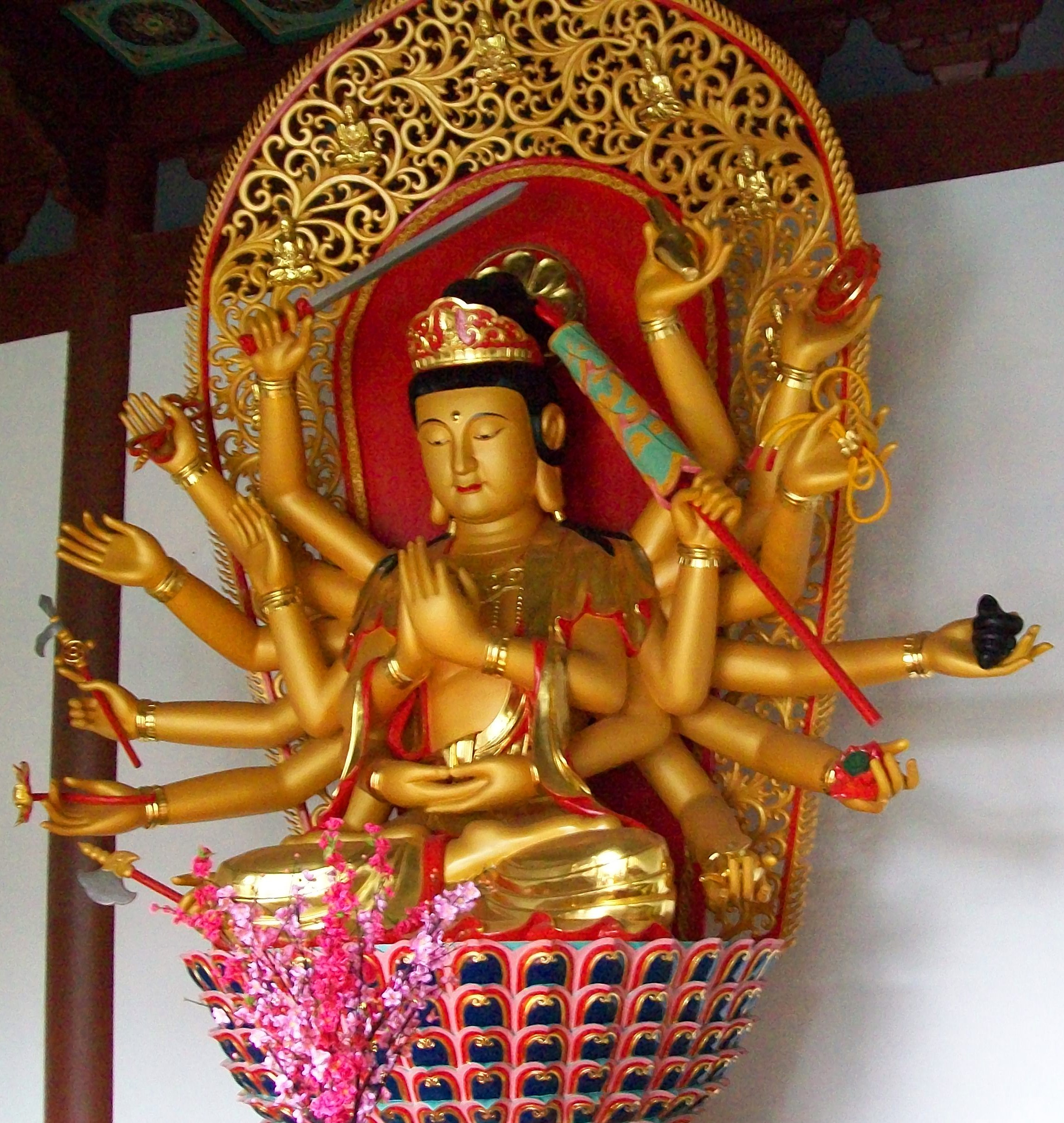
Statue of Zhunti Guanyin at Lingyin Temple in Hangzhou, China.

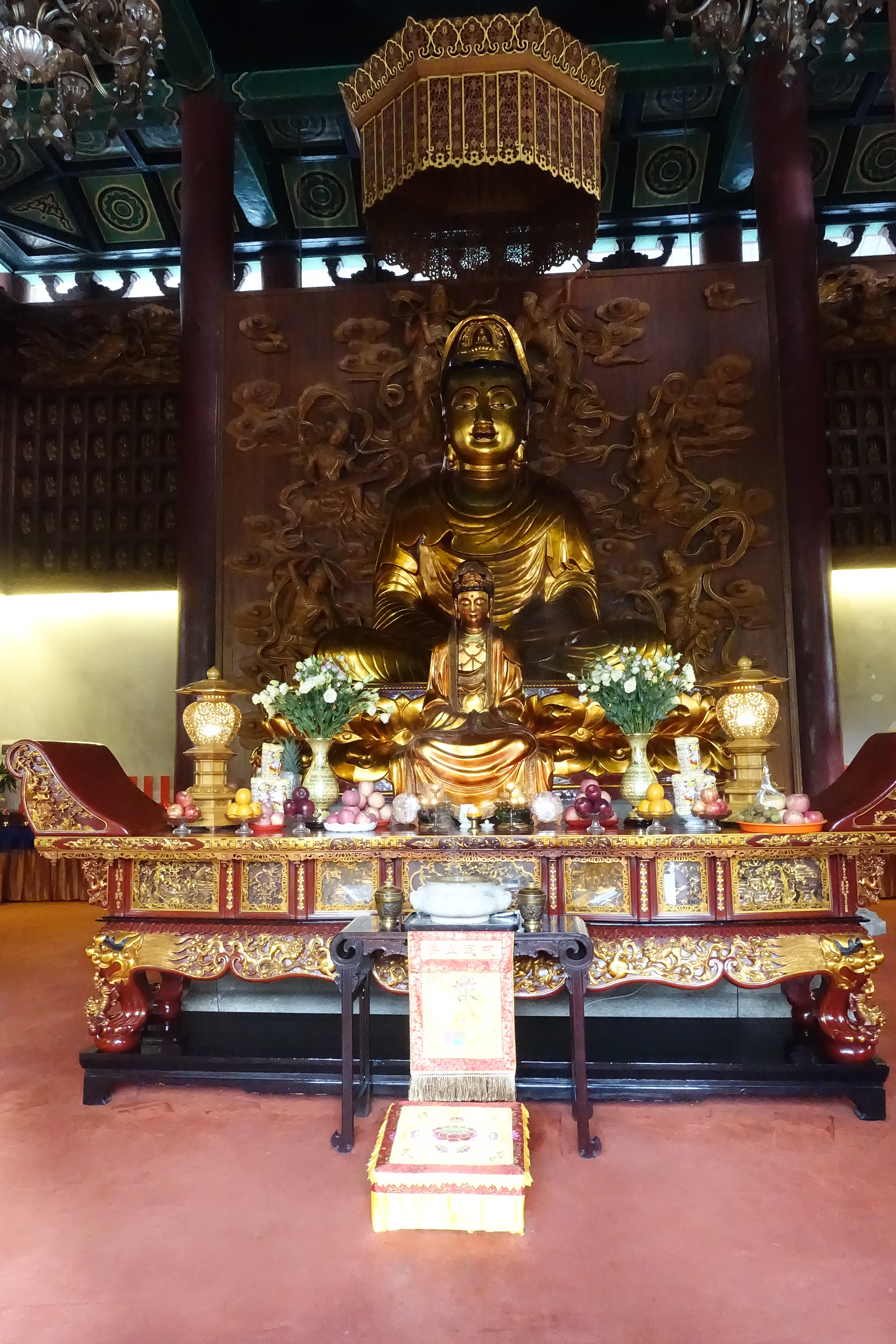
Statue of Guanyin at Liurong Temple in Guangzhou, China.

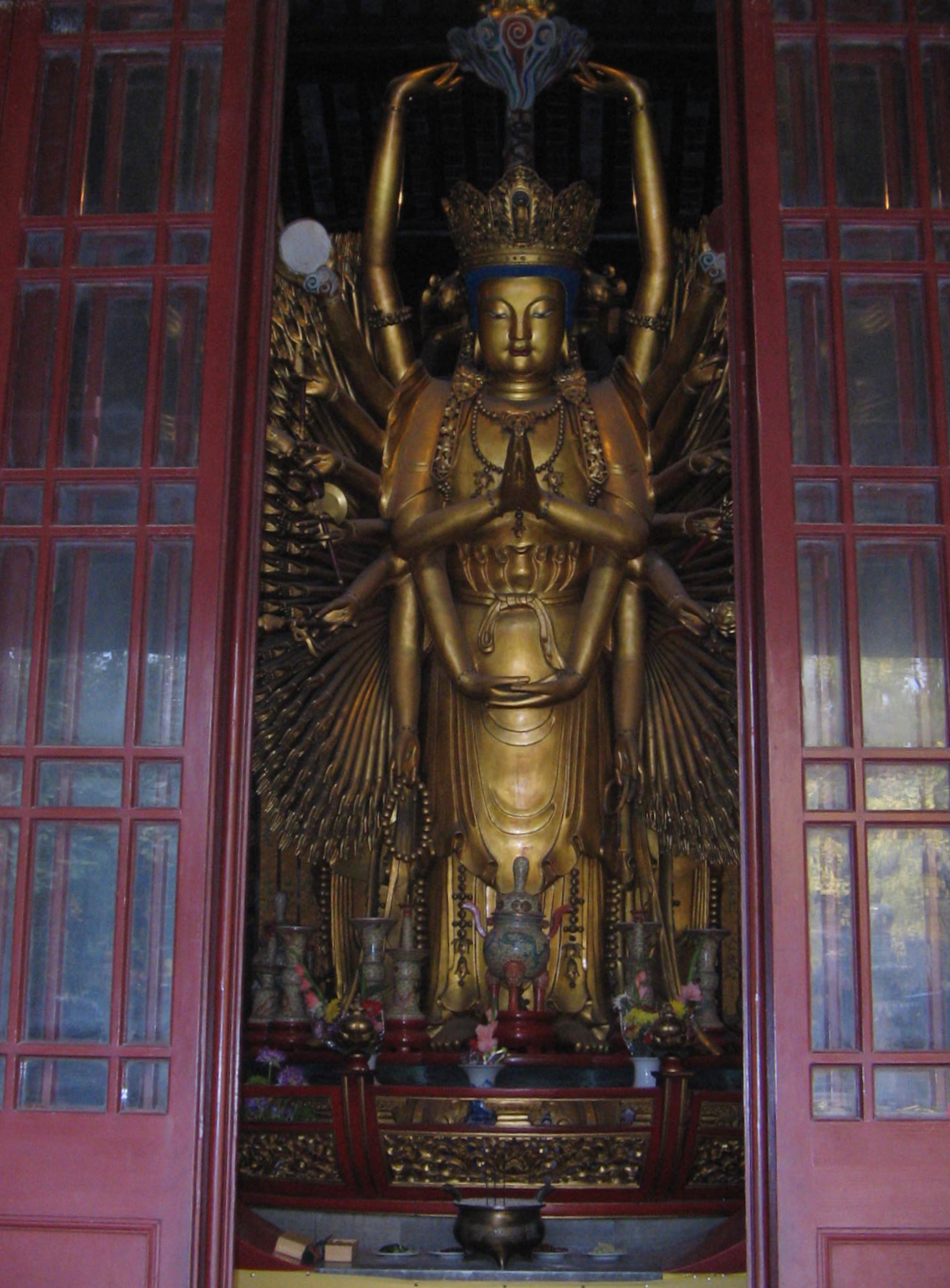
Statue of Qianshou Qianyan Guanyin at the Guanyin dian of Jade Buddha Temple in Shanghai, China.

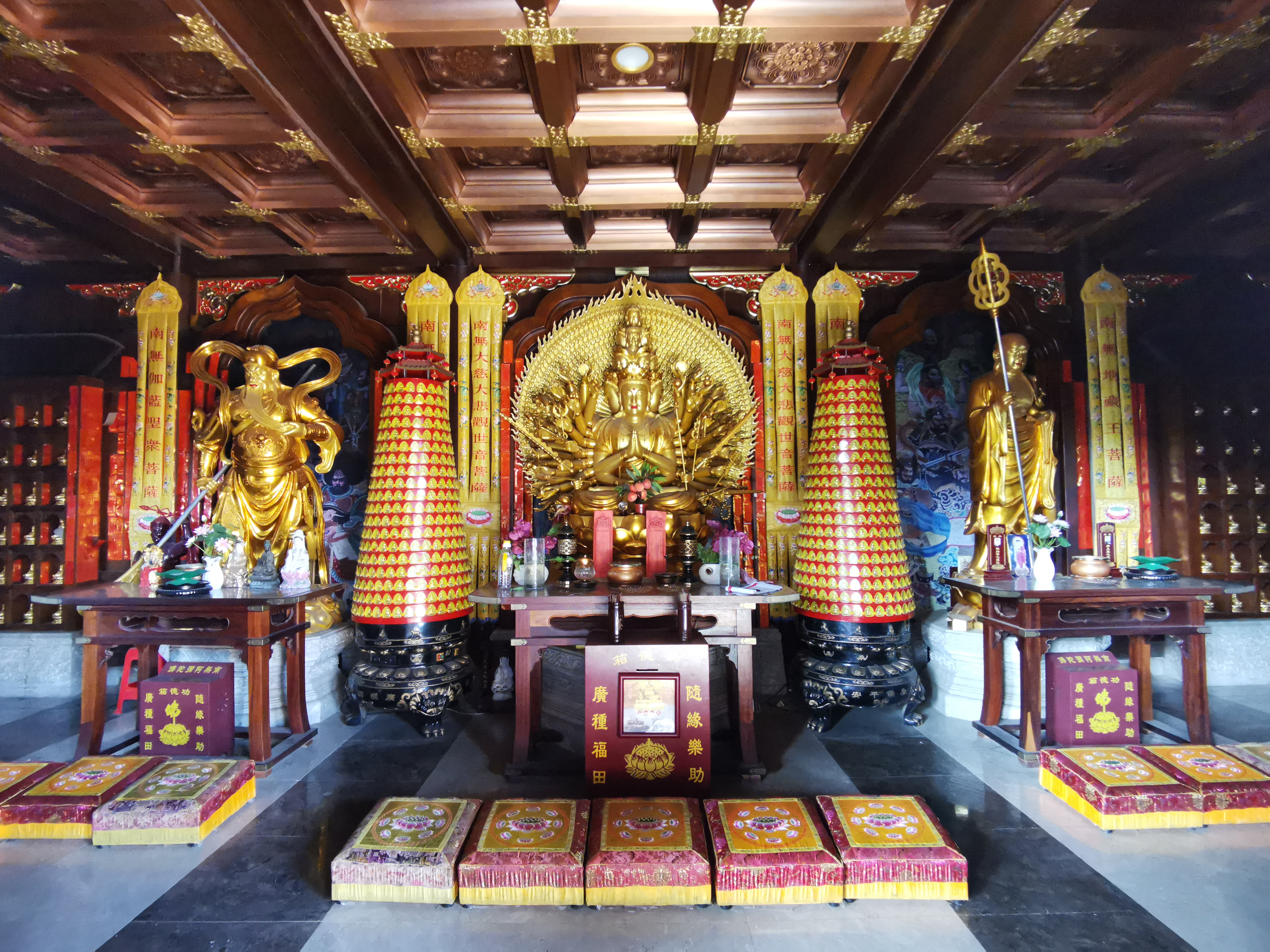
Statue of Qianshou Qianyan Guanyin flanked by the dharmapala Qielan on the right and the Bodhisattva Dizang on the left at the Guanyin dian of Zhaoshan Temple in Xiangtan, Hunan, China.

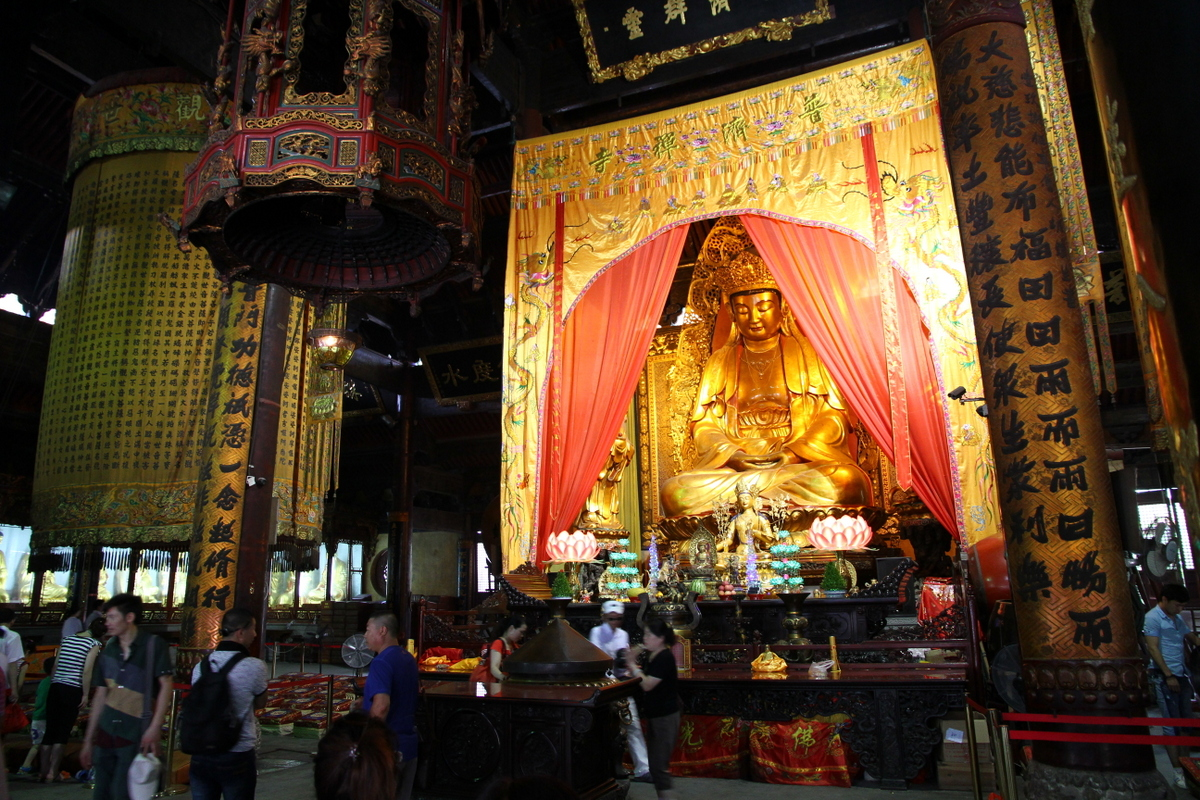
Statue of Pilu Guanyin, a manifestation of Guanyin who wears a crown called a Vairocana-crown bearing images of the Five Tathāgatas, at Puji Temple in Putuoshan, Zhejiang, China.

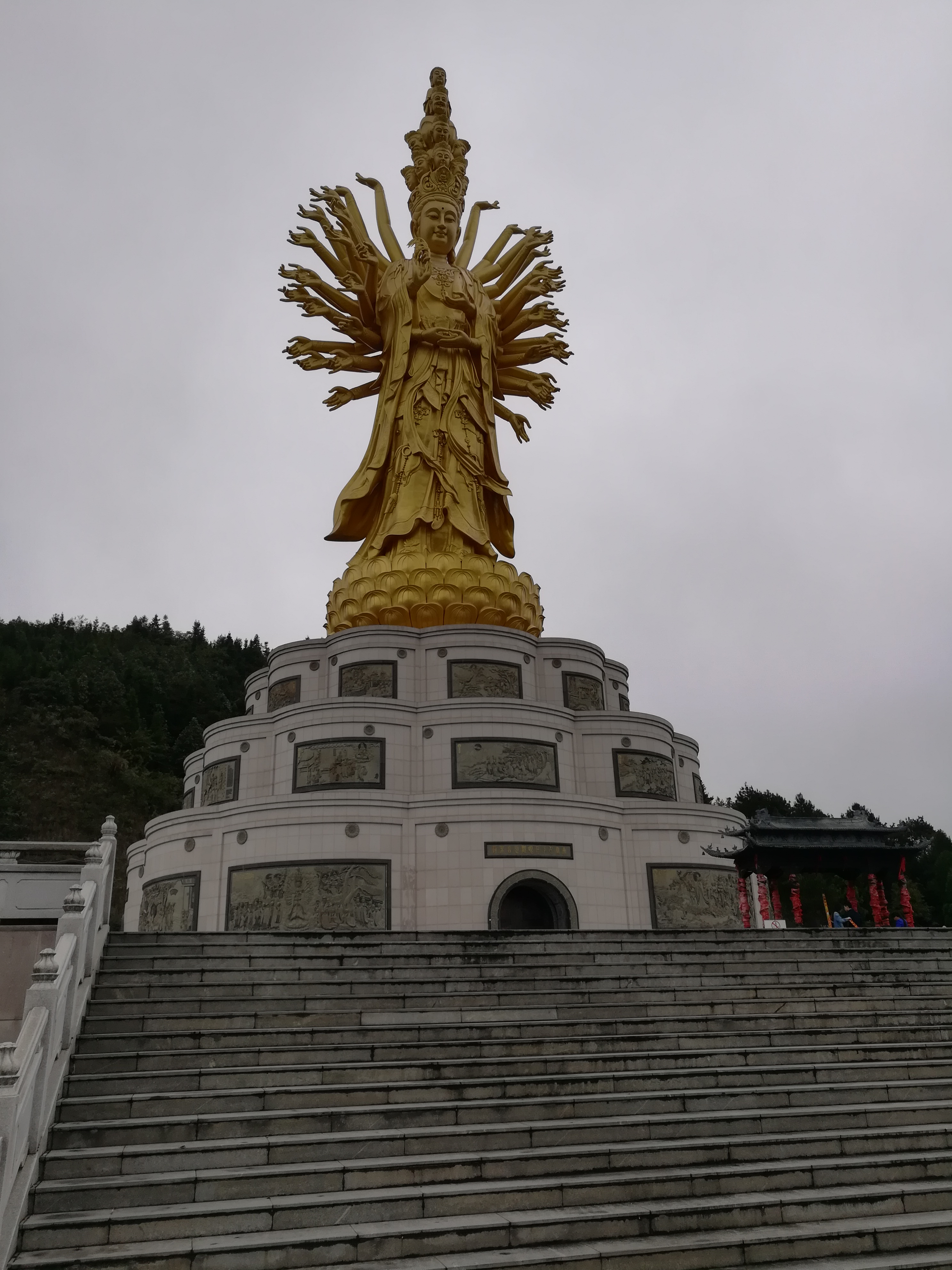
Statue of Qianshou Qianyan Guanyin at Miyin Temple in Ningxiang, Hunan, China.

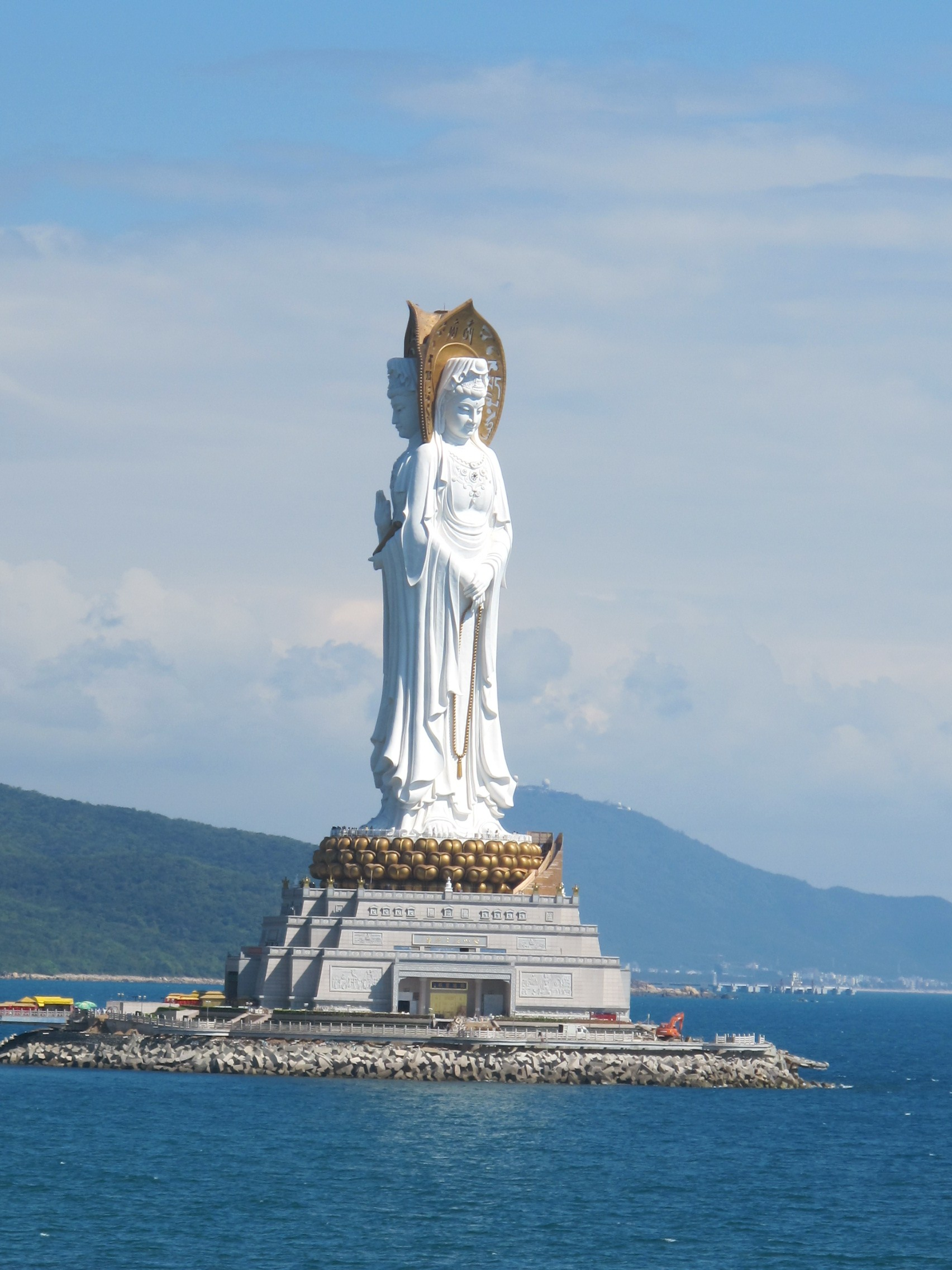
Guanyin of Nanshan at Nanshan Temple in Sanya, Hainan, China.

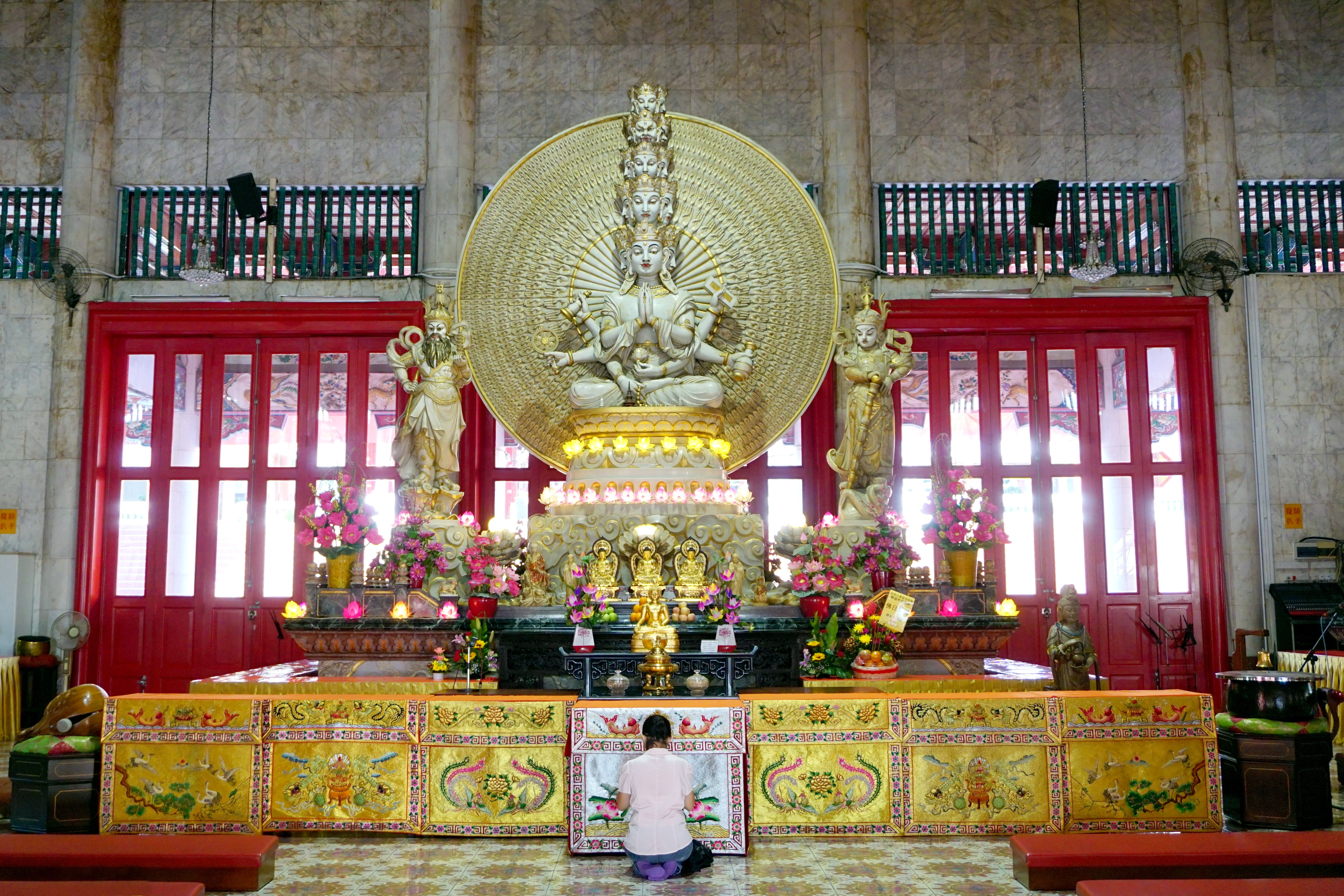
Statue of Qianshou Qianyan Guanyin flanked by the dharmapalas Weituo and Qielan at Kong Meng San Phor Kark See Monastery in Singapore.

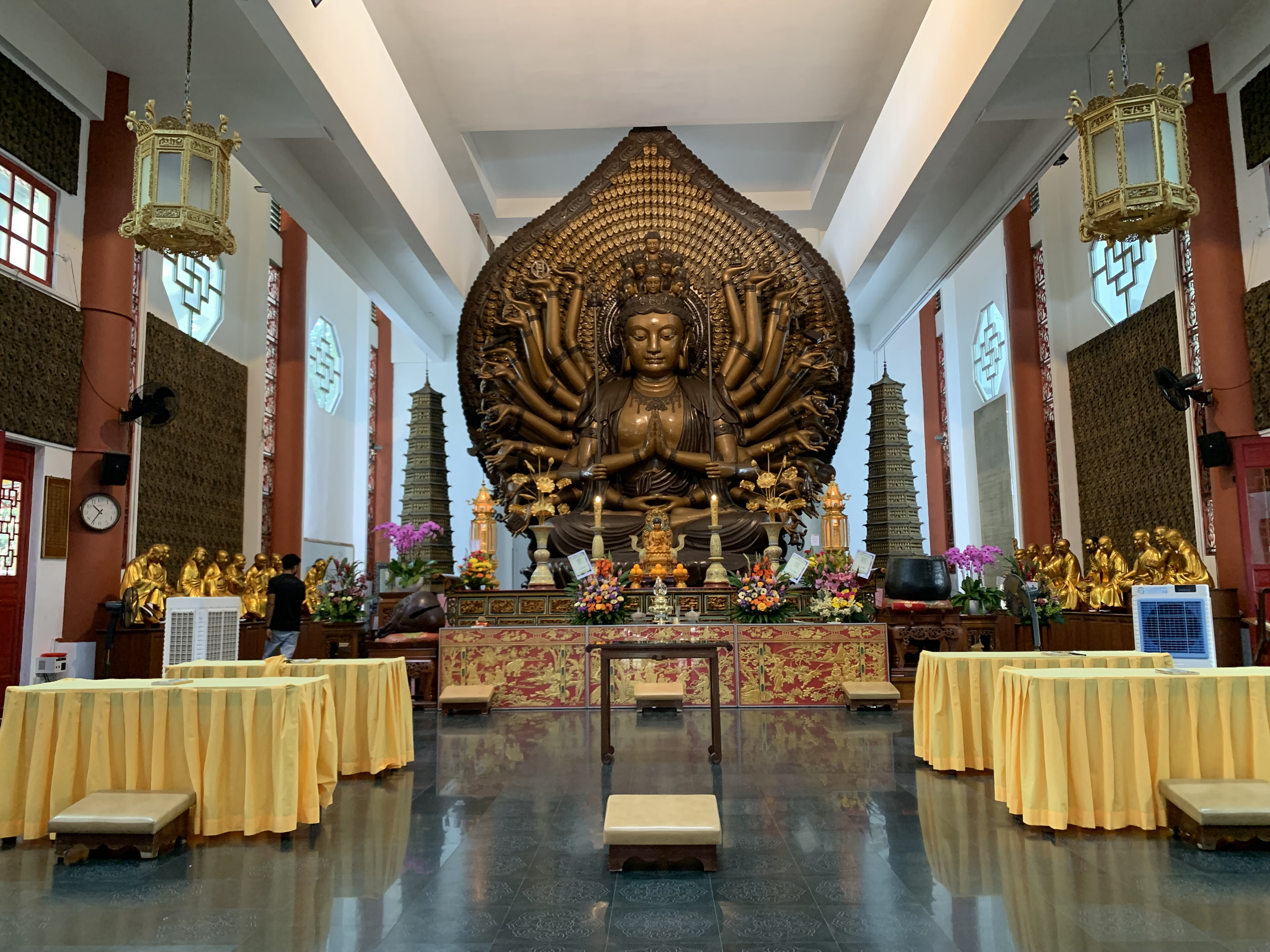
Statue of Qianshou Qianyan Guanyin at Lian Shan Shuang Lin Temple in Singapore.

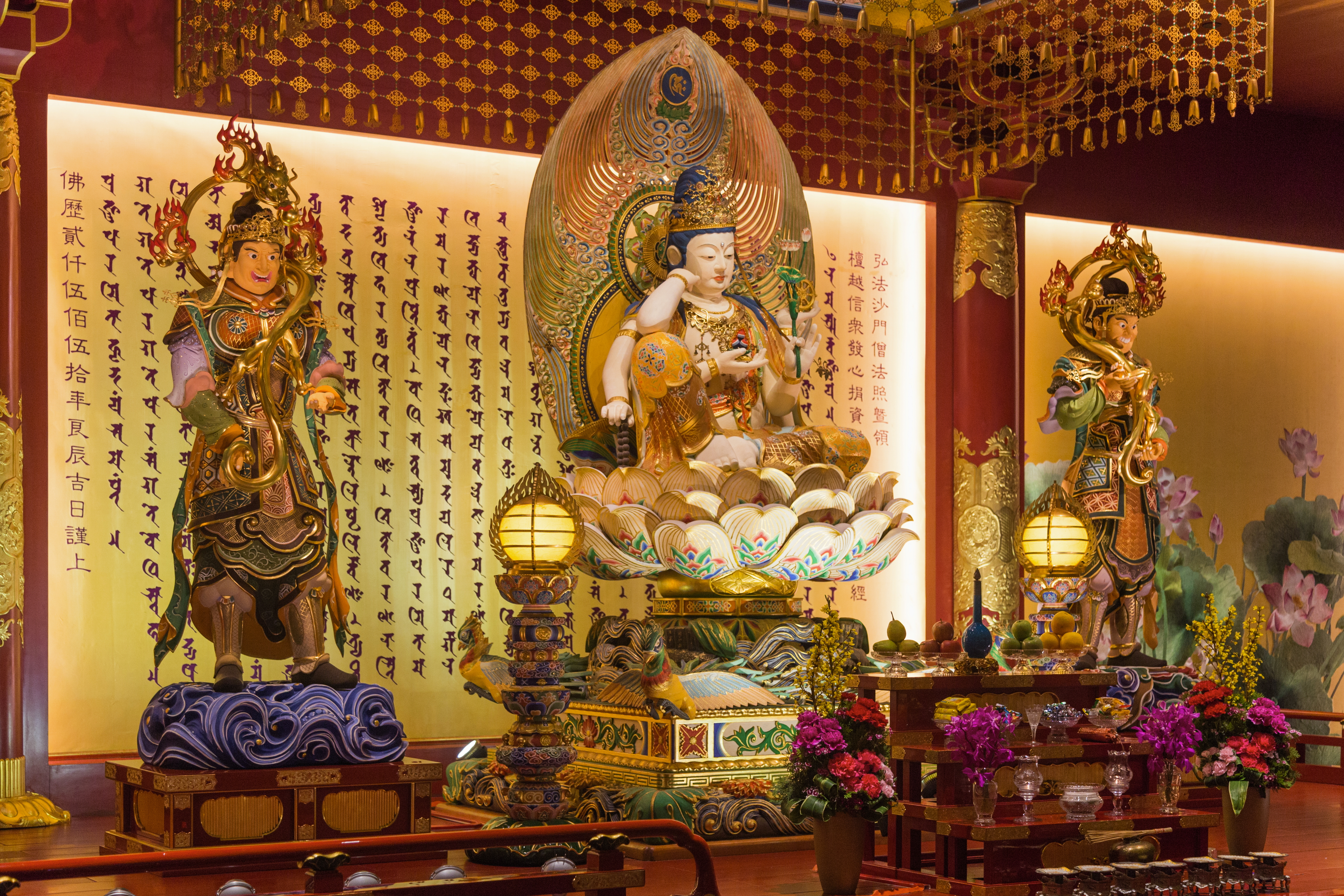
Statue of Ruyilun Guanyin in the Buddha Tooth Relic Temple and Museum in Chinatown in Singapore.

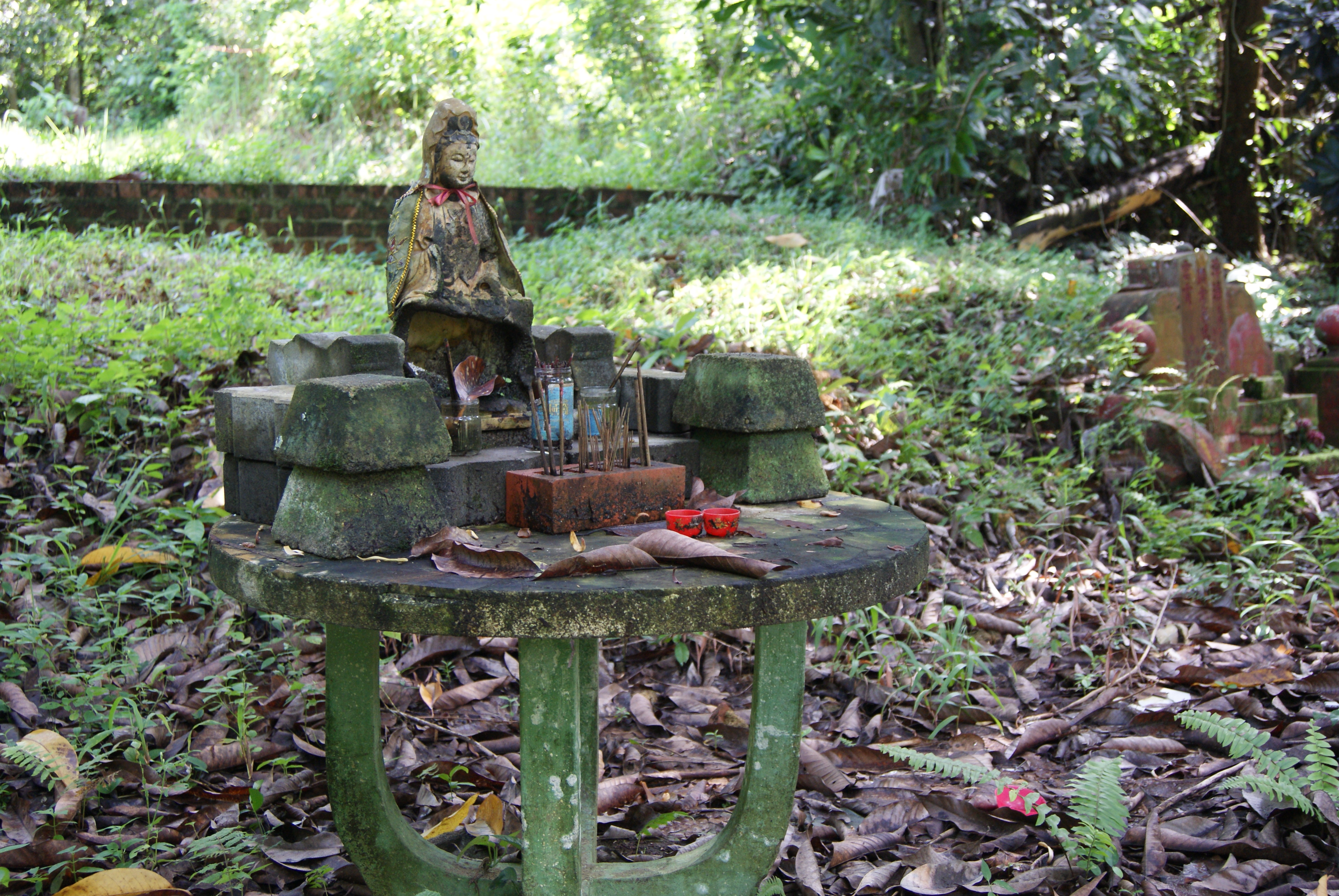
Altar to Guanyin at Bukit Brown Cemetery, Singapore

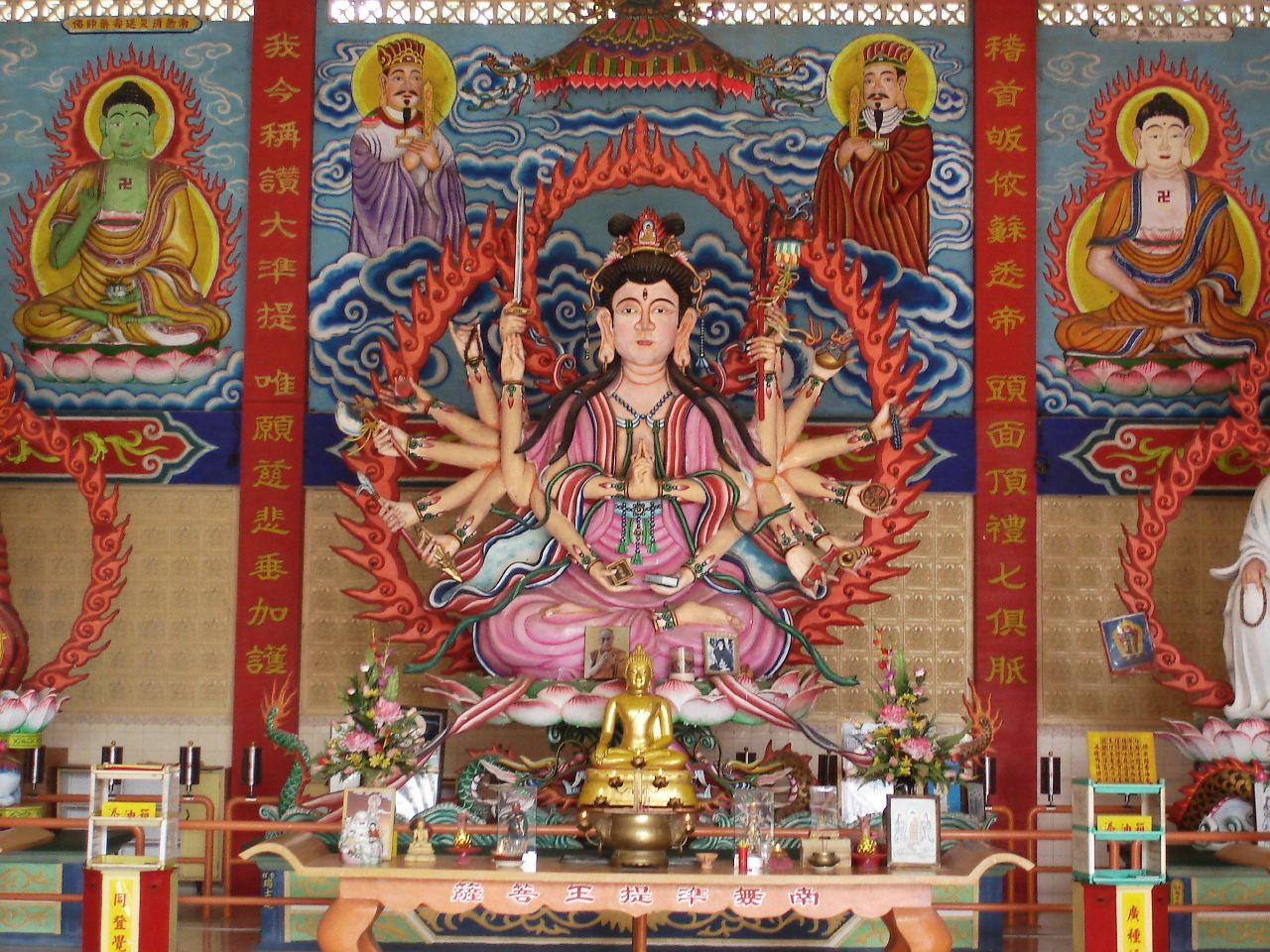
Statue of Zhunti Guanyin with eighteen arms wielding different dharma instruments or displaying mudras, flanked by devas and with Yaoshi Fo (Bhaiṣajyaguru) on her left and Amituofo (Amitābha) on her right. The Chinese text on the front of the altar reads, Namo Zhunti Wang Pusa, or "Namo Cundi King Bodhisattva." Enshrined at a Chinese Buddhist temple in Kelantan, Malaysia.

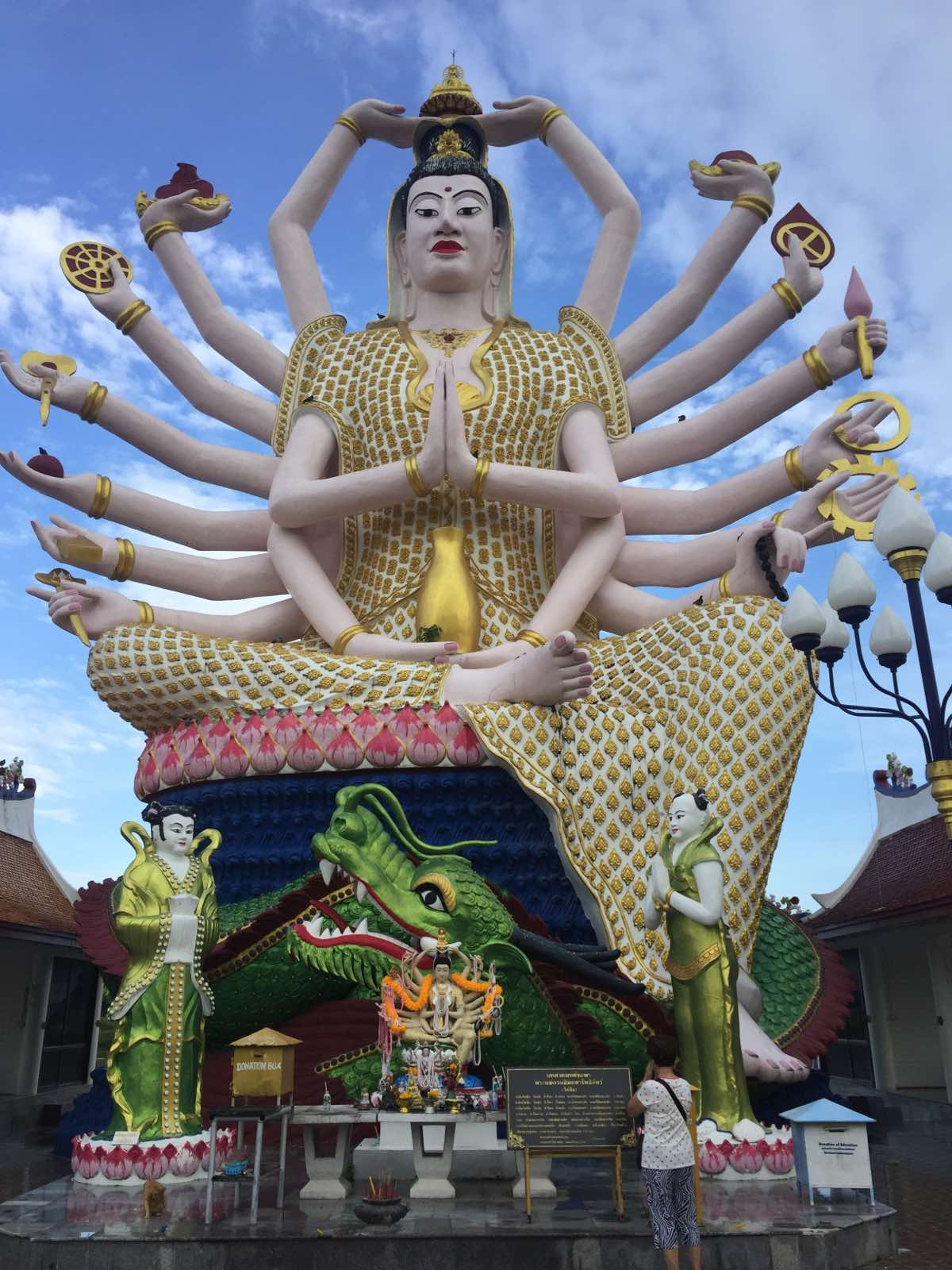
Statue of Guanyin with eighteen arms on at Wat Plai Laem on Ko Samui, Thailand.

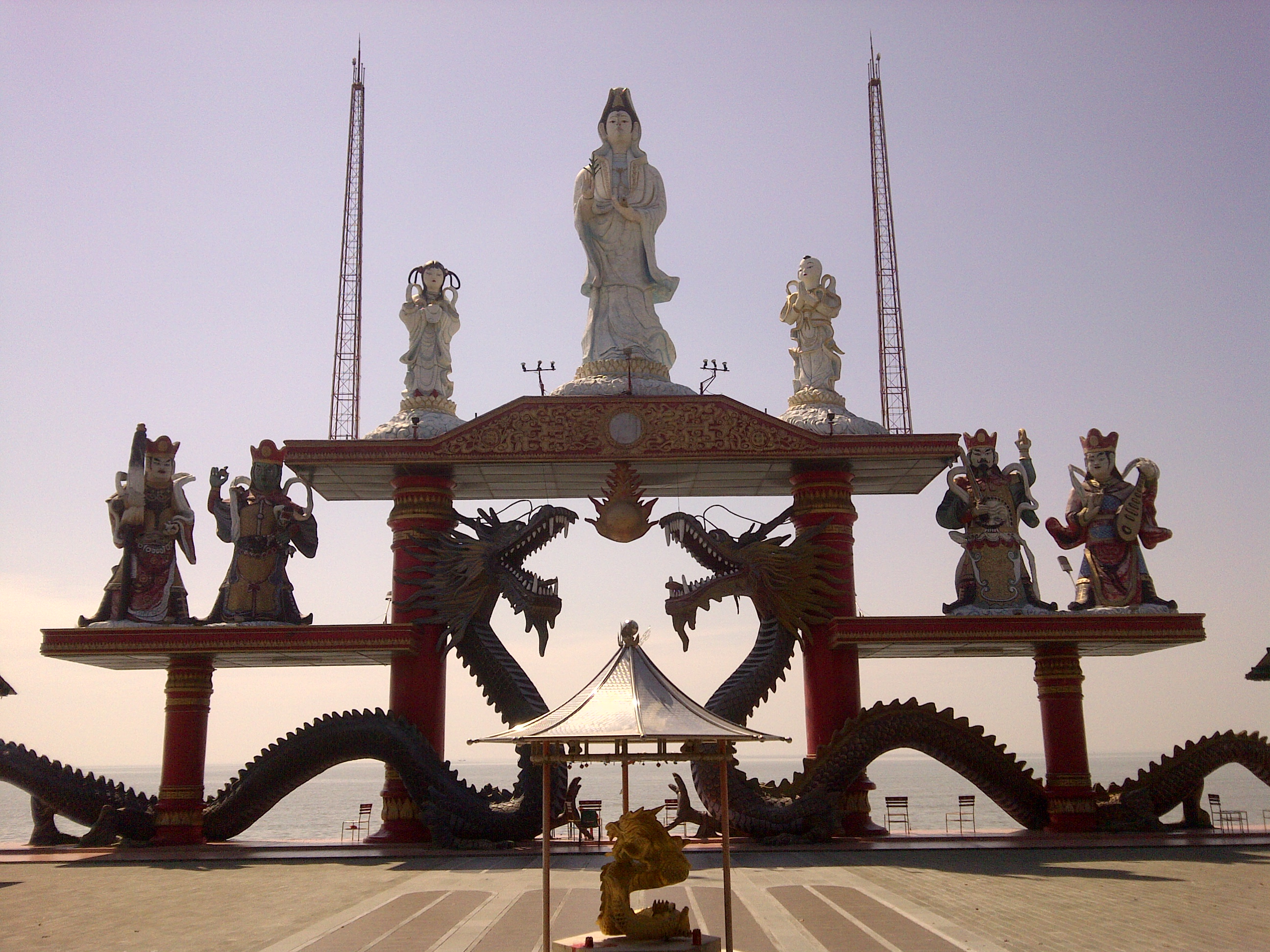
20-meter-high Guanyin Bodhisattva statue flanked by Longnü and Sudhana (top) Lower level shows the Four Heavenly Kings at Sanggar Agung, Surabaya, Indonesia.

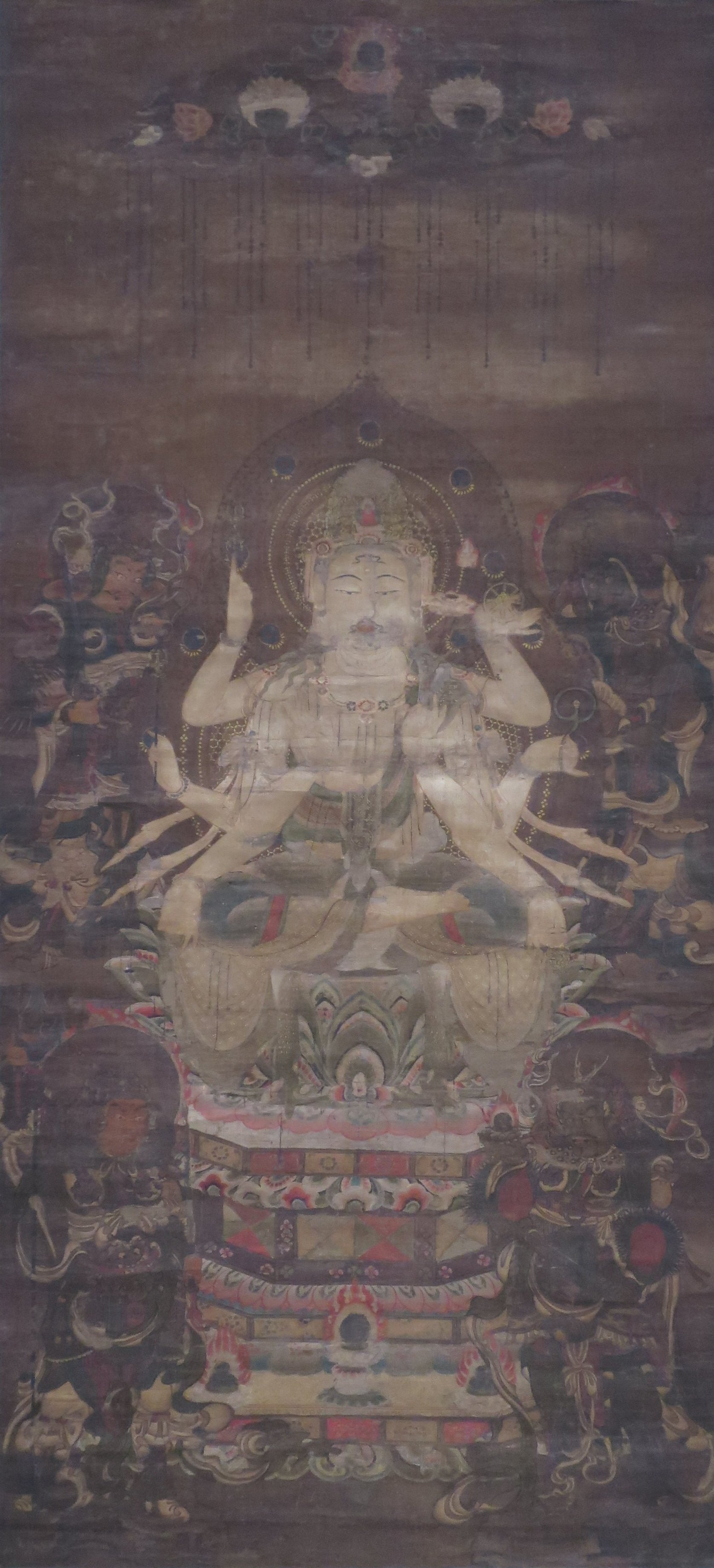
Heian period (794–1331) painting of Juntei Kannon. Held at the Tokyo National Museum in Tokyo, Japan.

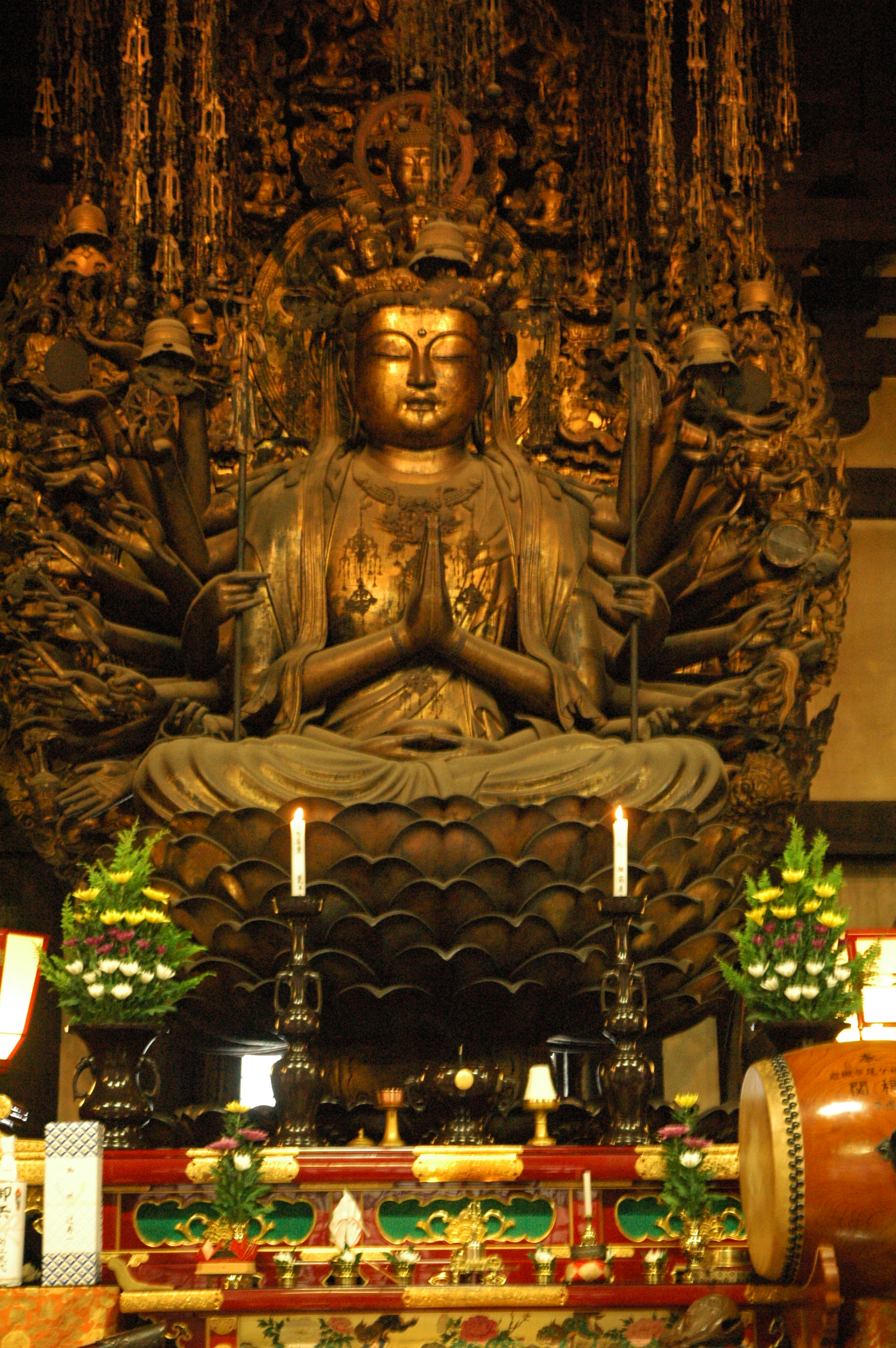
13th century Senjū Kannon, or the Thousand-Armed Kannon, at Sanjūsangen-dō, Kyoto, Japan. By the sculptor Tankei.

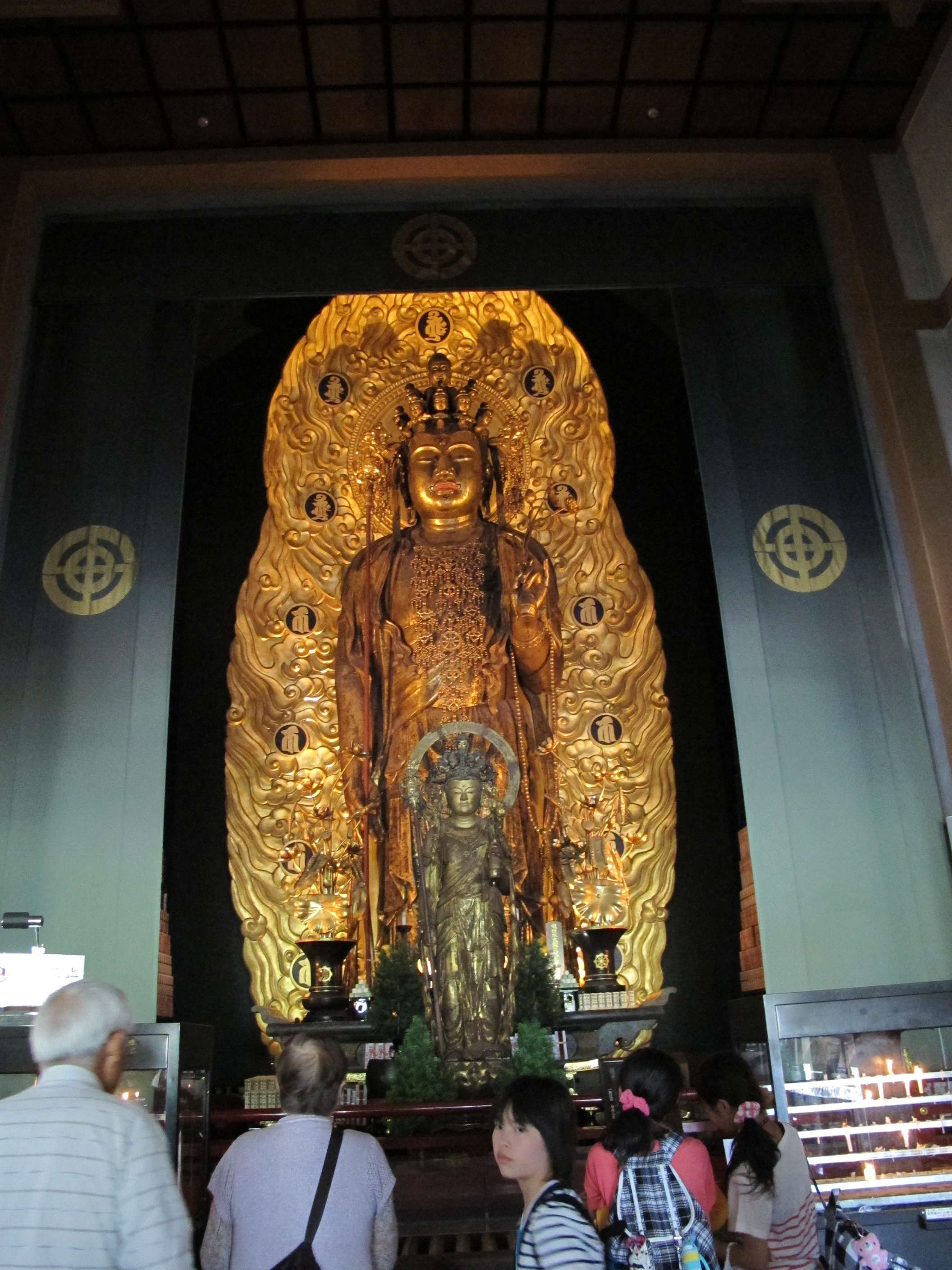
Possible Muromachi period (1336–1573) statue of Jūichimen Kannon at Hasadera in Kamakura, Kanagawa, Japan.

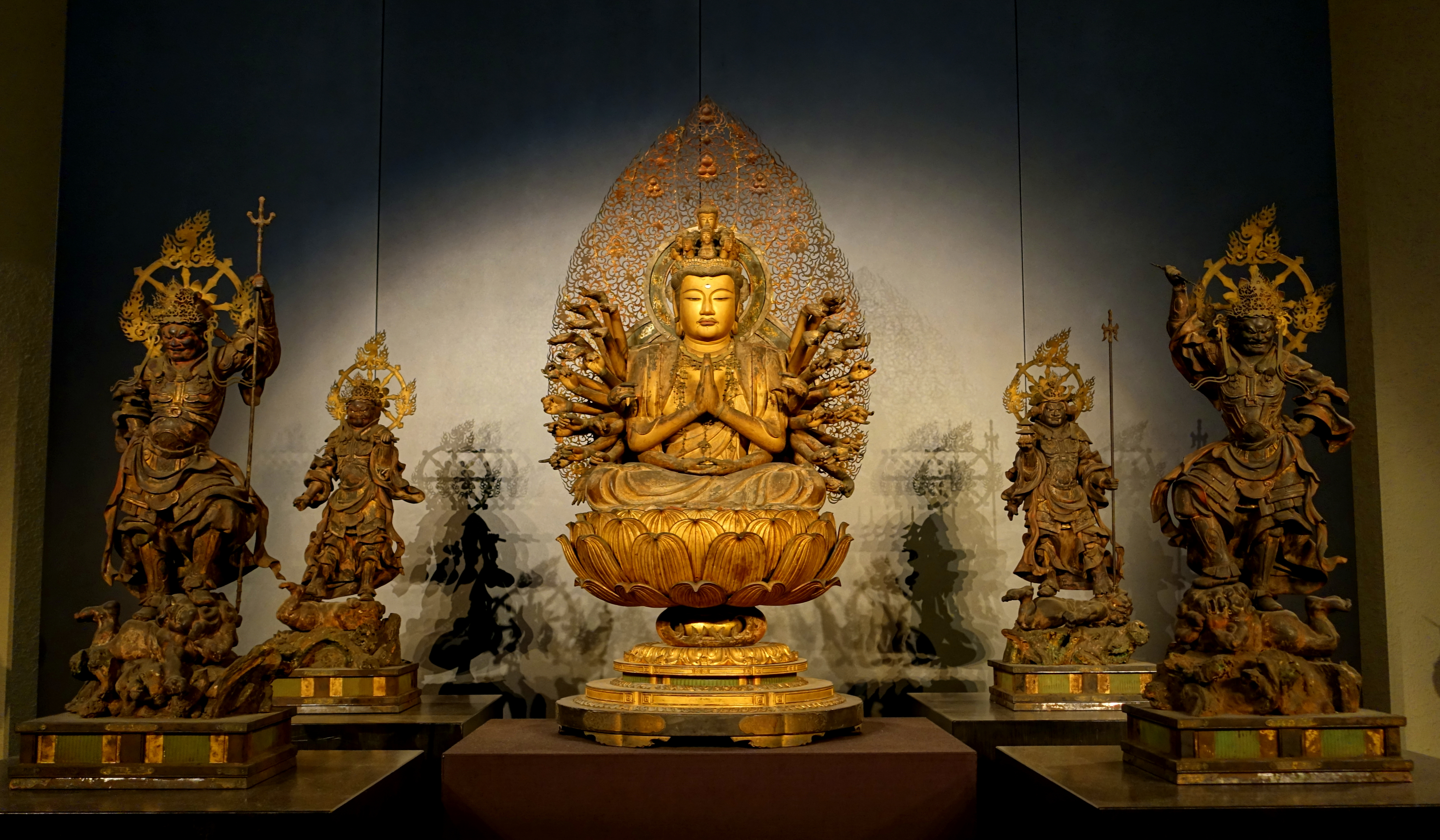
Nanbokuchō period (1336–1392) statues of Senjū Kannon with the Four Heavenly Kings flanking her. Held at the Tokyo National Museum in Tokyo, Japan.

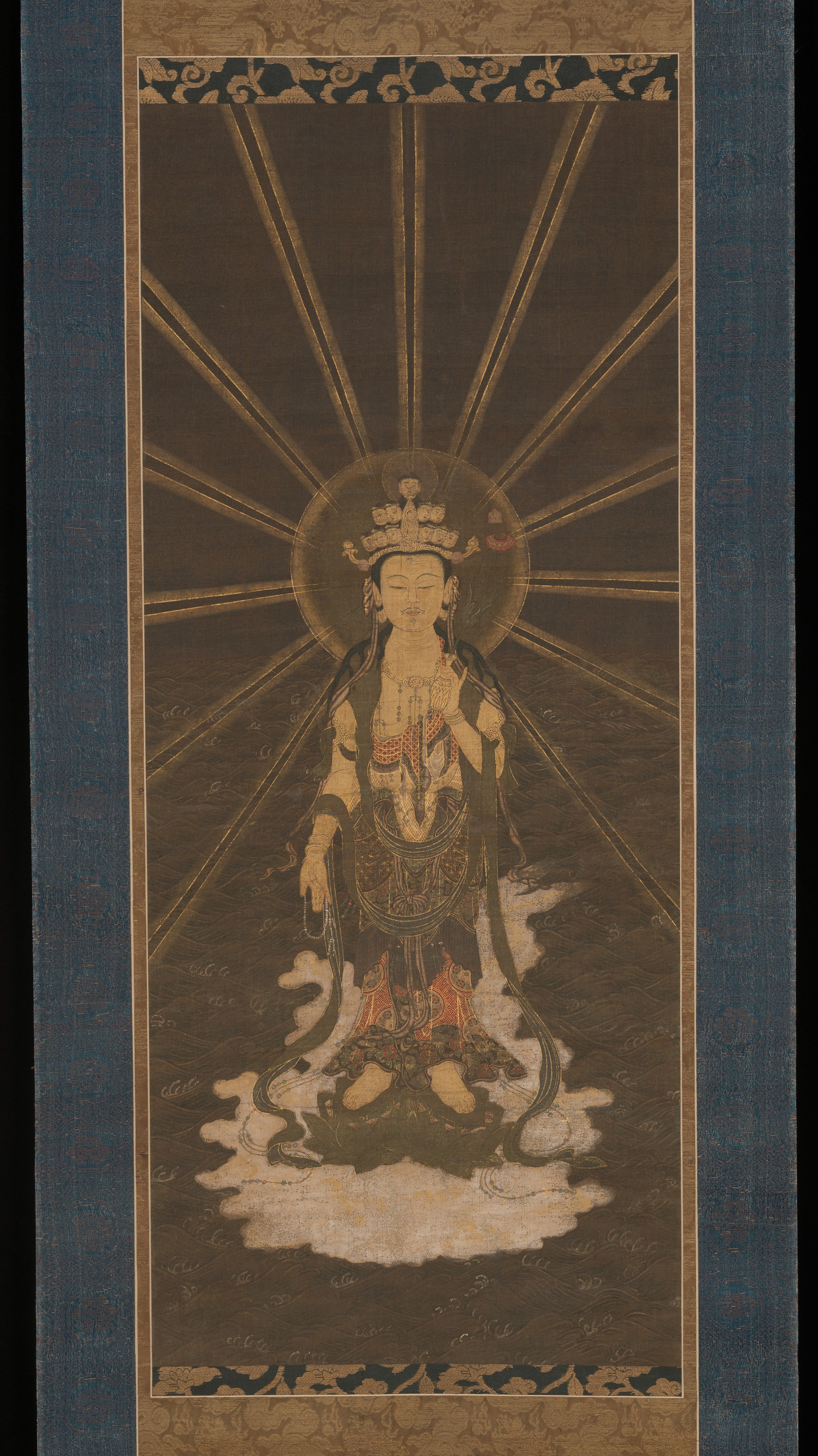
16th century Japanese painting of the raigō of Jūichimen Kannon. Held at the Metropolitan Museum of Art in New York City, USA.

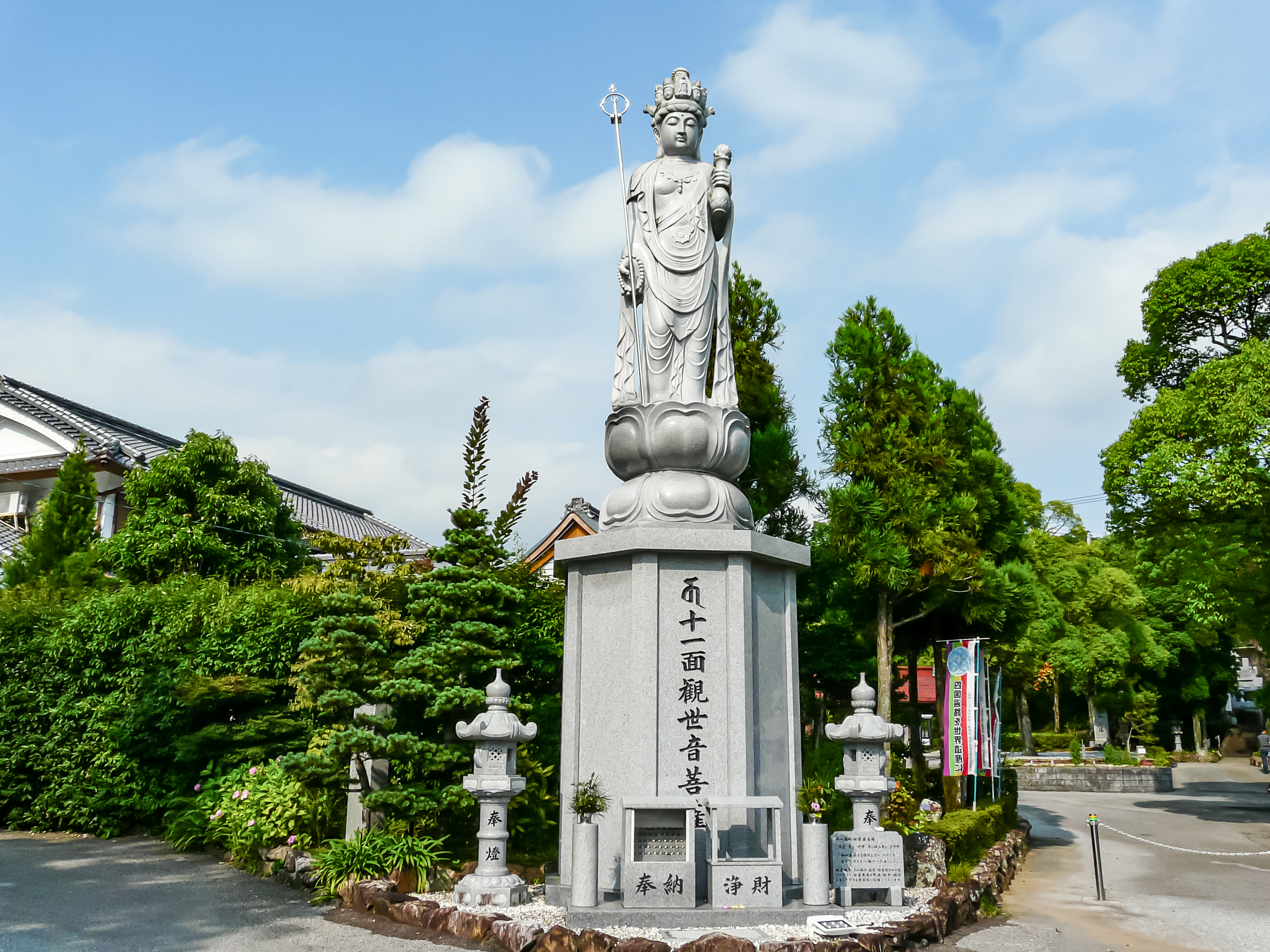
Statue of Jūichimen Kannon at Zenraku-ji in Kōchi, Kōchi, Japan.

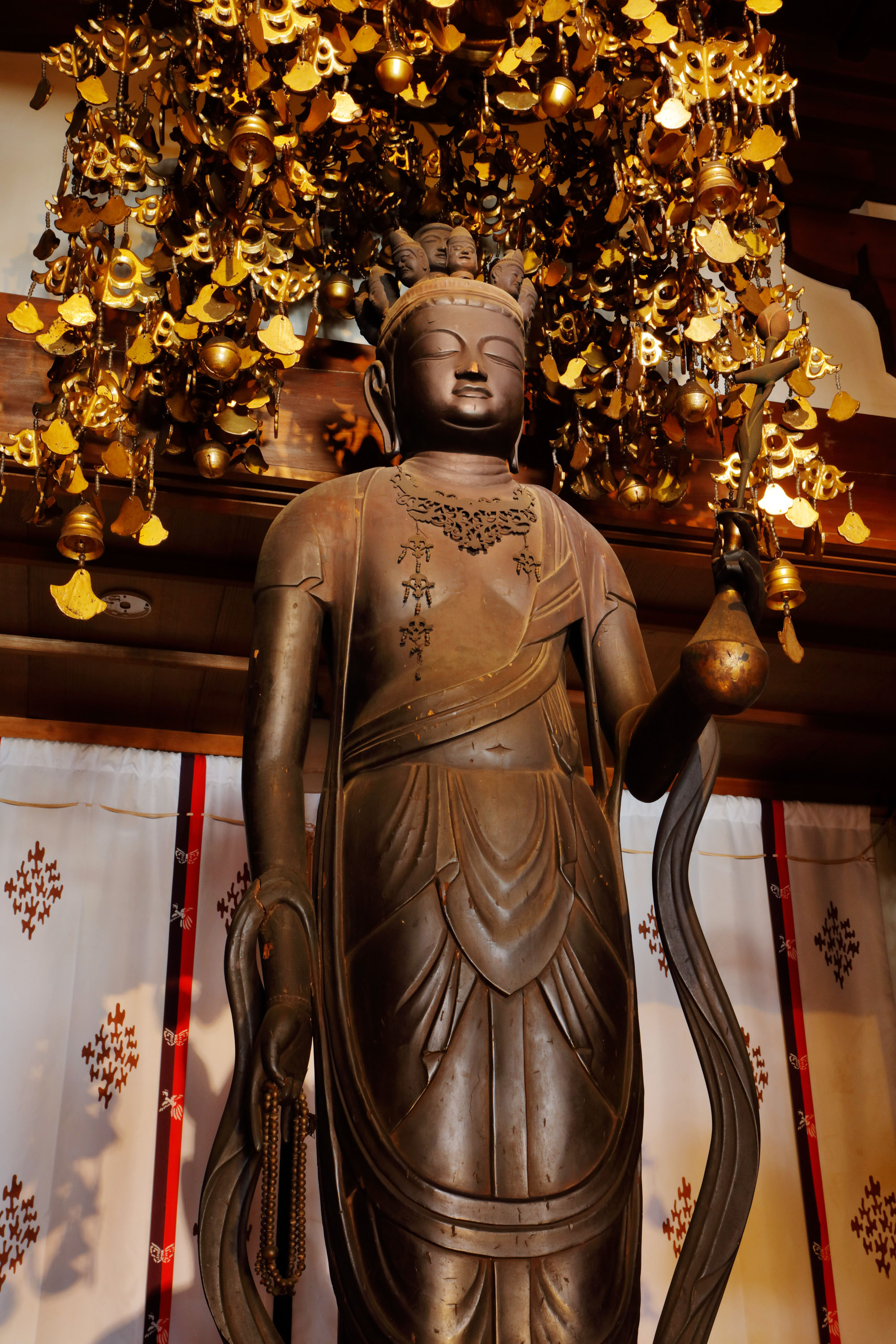
Statue of Jūichimen Kannon at Mie-ji in Gifu, Gifu, Japan.

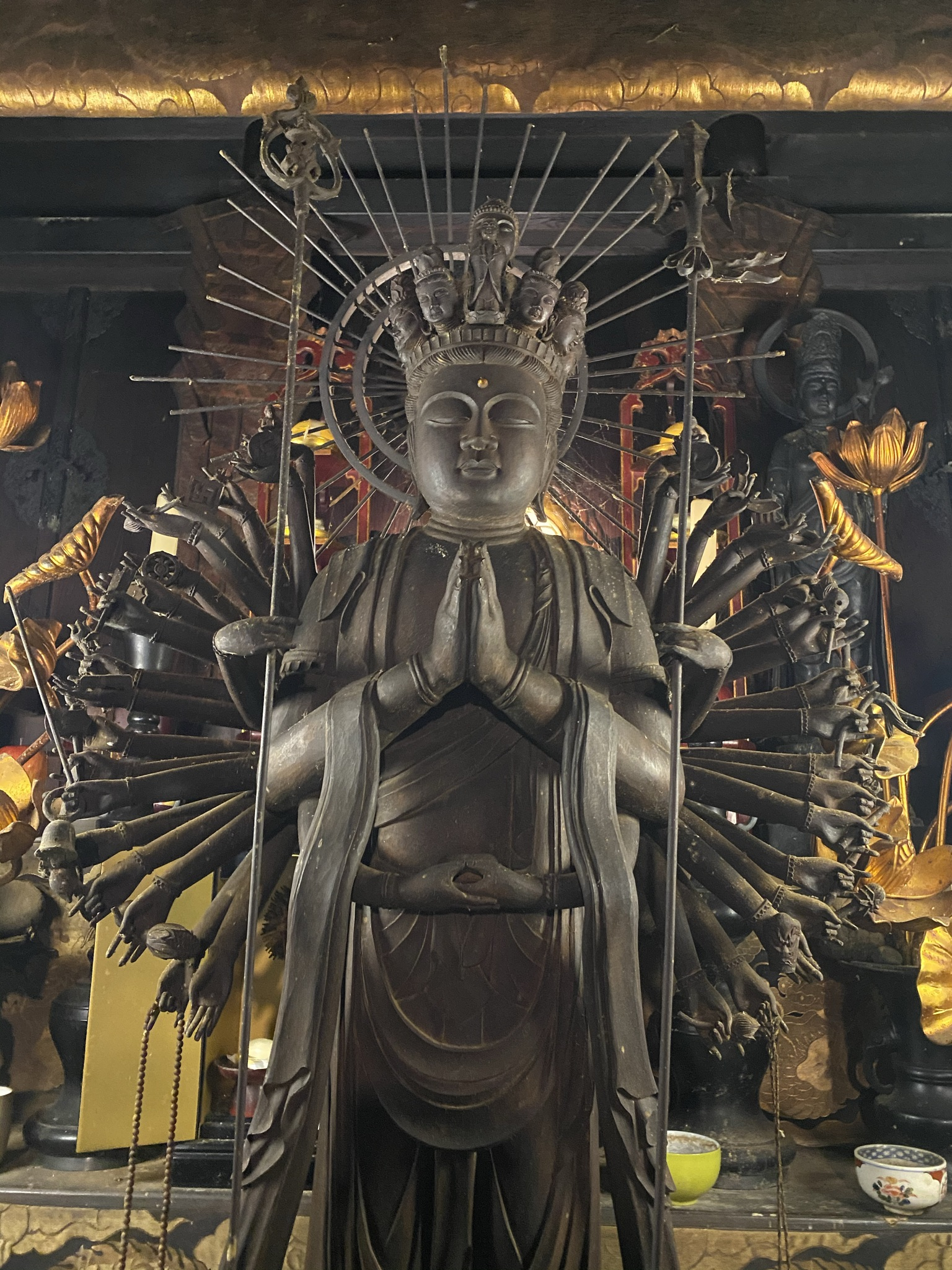
Statue of Senjū Sengen Kannon at Ryūzō-ji at Tamba, Hyōgo, Japan.

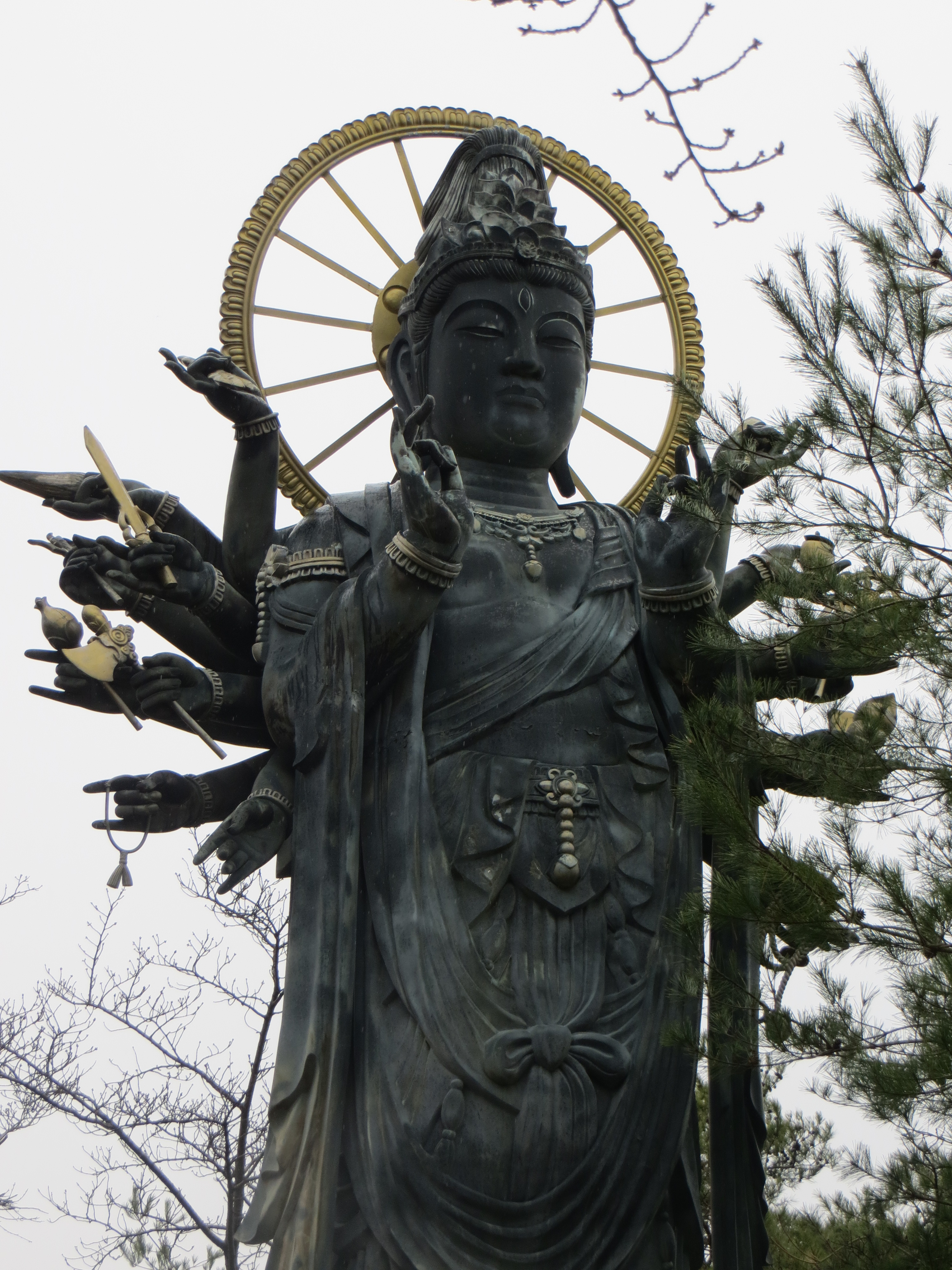
Statue of the eighteen-armed Juntei Kannon at Shichihō-ji in Nose, Osaka, Japan.

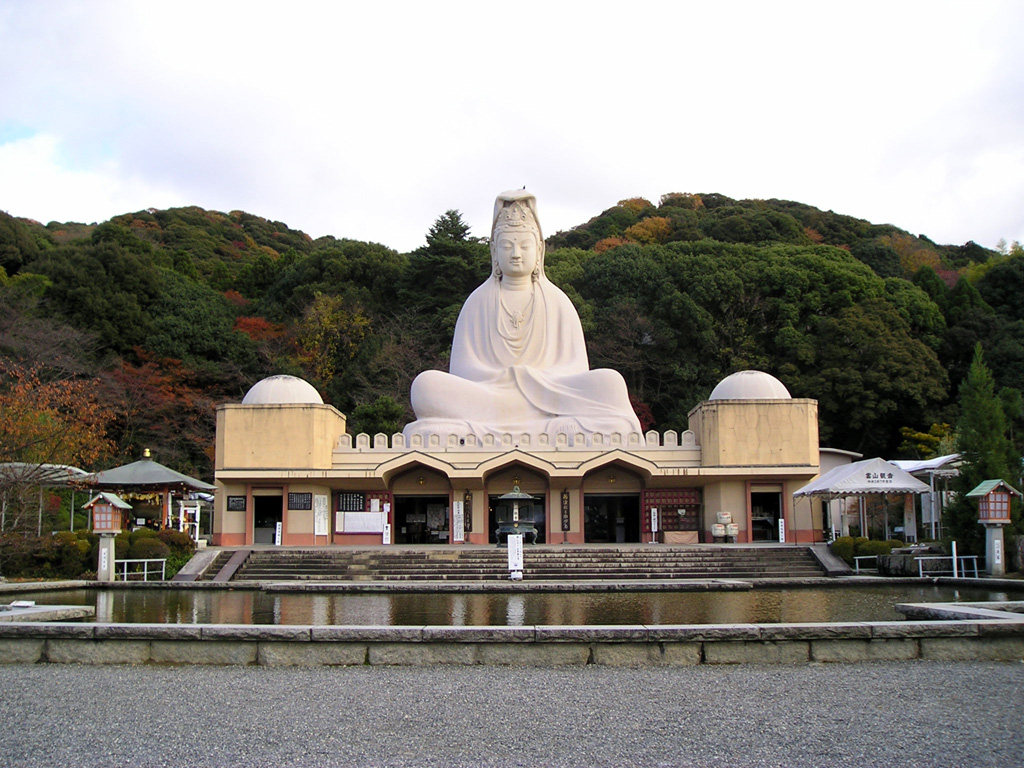
Ryōzen Kannon in Kyoto, Kyoto, Japan.

== See also ==
- Cihang Zhenren, Taoist counterpart of Guanyin
- Kṣitigarbha
- Longnü and Sudhana
- Lotus Sutra
- Manjusri
- Queen Mother of the West
- Samantabhadra
- Tara (Buddhism)
- Saigoku Kannon Pilgrimage
- Mount Putuo, sacred ground of Guanyin
- Quan Âm Pagoda (Ho Chi Minh City), Vietnam
- Cheng Hoon Teng Temple, Malacca, Malaysia
- Kwan Im Thong Hood Cho Temple, Singapore
- Wat Plai Laem, Ko Samui, Thailand
- Lin Fa Temple, Hong Kong
- Kim Tek Ie Temple, Jakarta, Indonesia
- Guanyin of Nanshan, the fourteenth tallest statue in the world
- Tieguanyin, a variety of oolong named after Guanyin
- Yujia Yankou, an esoteric Chinese Buddhist ritual where Guanyin is the central figure
- Dabei Chan, a Chinese Buddhist repentance rite where the thousand-armed and thousand-eyed form of Guanyin is the central figure
- Avalokitesvara
